= Len Frig =

Canadian ice hockey player

- Born: October 30, 1950 (age 74); Blairmore, Alberta, Canada
- Height: 6 ft 0 in (183 cm)
- Weight: 190 lb (86 kg; 13 st 8 lb)
- Position: Defenceman
- Shot: Left
- Played for: Chicago Black Hawks; Oakland Seals; Cleveland Barons; St. Louis Blues
- NHL draft: 42nd overall, 1970; Chicago Blackhawks
- Playing career: 1969–1986

Leonard Elroy Frig (born October 30, 1950) is a Canadian former professional ice hockey defenceman who played 311 games in the National Hockey League. He played for the Chicago Black Hawks, Oakland Seals, Cleveland Barons, and St. Louis Blues between 1973 and 1980. The rest of his career, which lasted from 1969 to 1986, was spent in different minor leagues. He also played 1 game for the Utah Rollerbees who competed for one season in the now defunct league Roller Hockey International. He compiled 12 penalty minutes during his only game. He was born in Blairmore, Alberta but grew up in Lethbridge, Alberta.

== Career statistics ==
=== Regular season and playoffs ===
			Regular season					Playoffs
Season	Team	League	GP	G	A	Pts	PIM	GP	G	A	Pts	PIM
1967–68	Lethbridge Sugar Kings	AJHL	—	—	—	—	—	—	—	—	—	—
1968–69	Lethbridge Sugar Kings	AJHL	—	—	—	—	—	—	—	—	—	—
1969–70	Calgary Centennials	WCHL	59	9	15	24	119	16	6	8	14	32
1970–71	Calgary Centennials	WCHL	51	13	32	45	175	—	—	—	—	—
1971–72	Dallas Black Hawks	CHL	66	4	30	34	224	12	1	8	9	22
1972–73	Dallas Black Hawks	CHL	72	10	22	32	105	7	1	2	3	14
1972–73	Chicago Blackhawks	NHL	—	—	—	—	—	4	1	1	2	0
1973–74	Chicago Blackhawks	NHL	66	4	10	14	35	7	1	0	1	0
1974–75	California Golden Seals	NHL	80	3	17	20	127	—	—	—	—	—
1975–76	California Golden Seals	NHL	62	3	12	15	55	—	—	—	—	—
1976–77	Cleveland Barons	NHL	66	2	7	9	213	—	—	—	—	—
1977–78	St. Louis Blues	NHL	30	1	3	4	45	—	—	—	—	—
1977–78	Salt Lake Golden Eagles	CHL	29	3	7	10	104	6	1	0	1	33
1978–79	Salt Lake Golden Eagles	CHL	76	12	32	44	137	10	2	3	5	15
1979–80	St. Louis Blues	NHL	7	0	2	2	4	3	0	0	0	0
1979–80	Salt Lake Golden Eagles	CHL	71	7	33	40	89	11	1	6	7	4
1980–81	Salt Lake Golden Eagles	CHL	74	9	48	57	194	13	1	2	3	29
1983–84	Salt Lake Golden Eagles	CHL	2	0	0	0	4	—	—	—	—	—
1984–85	Salt Lake Golden Eagles	IHL	78	3	16	19	110	5	0	2	2	11
1985–86	Salt Lake Golden Eagles	IHL	18	0	5	5	24	—	—	—	—	—
NHL totals			311	13	51	64	479	14	2	1	3	0

== Awards ==
- WCHL All-Star Team – 1971
