= 1971–72 Vancouver Canucks season =

2nd season in franchise history

1971–72 Vancouver Canucks
- Division: 7th East
- 1971–72 record: 20–50–8
- Home record: 14–20–5
- Road record: 6–30–3
- Goals for: 203
- Goals against: 297

Team information
- General manager: Bud Poile
- Coach: Hal Laycoe
- Captain: Orland Kurtenbach
- Alternate captains: Andre Boudrias; Dale Tallon; Gary Doak; Wayne Maki
- Arena: Pacific Coliseum
- Average attendance: 15,284

Team leaders
- Goals: Andre Boudrias (27)
- Assists: Jocelyn Guevremont (38)
- Points: Andre Boudrias, Orland Kurtenbach (61)
- Penalty minutes: John Schella (166)
- Wins: Dunc Wilson (16)
- Goals against average: Dunc Wilson (3.61)

The 1971–72 Vancouver Canucks season was the Canucks' second season in the NHL. They finished 7th, last, in the East Division. Hal Laycoe, the team's first head coach, was fired after the season concluded and replaced by Vic Stasiuk.

== Regular season ==
The Canucks opened the season at home against the Toronto Maple Leafs on October 8, 1971. They lost the game 3–2, though Jocelyn Guevremont, the team's first draft choice in the 1971 NHL amateur draft, scored his first goal. In their game against the Minnesota North Stars on October 20, the Canucks were shutout for the first time, losing 7–0. One week later the Canucks played the Maple Leafs and drew them 0–0, the first time the team had a shutout of their own; Dunc Wilson was in net for the Canucks, while Bernie Parent was in for the Maple Leafs.

During his tour of Canada, Soviet Premier Alexei Kosygin and his entourage watched the Canucks play the Montreal Canadiens on October 22. They stayed for the first two periods and saw Montreal score four goals en route to winning the game 6–0. Frank Mahovlich recorded a hat trick for the Canadiens, while Ken Dryden earned the shutout.

With the season concluded, Hal Laycoe was fired as head coach of the team. He was appointed vice-president of player development and scouting, and Vic Stasiuk was named the new coach.

== Standings ==
=== Divisional standings ===
East Division
		GP	W	L	T	GF	GA	DIFF	Pts
1	Boston Bruins	78	54	13	11	330	204	+126	119
2	New York Rangers	78	48	17	13	317	192	+125	109
3	Montreal Canadiens	78	46	16	16	307	205	+102	108
4	Toronto Maple Leafs	78	33	31	14	209	208	+1	80
5	Detroit Red Wings	78	33	35	10	261	262	−1	76
6	Buffalo Sabres	78	16	43	19	203	289	−86	51
7	Vancouver Canucks	78	20	50	8	203	297	−94	48

=== Record vs. opponents ===
==== Vs. East Division ====
1971–72 NHL records
Team	BOS	BUF	DET	MTL	NYR	TOR	VAN	Total
Boston	—	3–1–2	5–1	2–3–1	5–1	4–1–1	6–0	25–7–4
Buffalo	1–3–2	—	0–4–2	1–4–1	0–6	1–5	2–3–1	5–25–6
Detroit	1–5	4–0–2	—	3–3	1–4–1	3–3	5–0–1	17–15–4
Montreal	3–2–1	4–1–1	3–3	—	1–3–2	4–1–1	6–0	21–10–5
New York	1–5	6–0	4–1–1	3–1–2	—	2–2–2	5–1	21–10–5
Toronto	1–4–1	5–1	3–3	1–4–1	2–2–2	—	2–2–2	14–16–6
Vancouver	0–6	3–2–1	0–5–1	0–6	1–5	2–2–2	—	6–26–4

==== Vs. West Division ====
1971–72 NHL records
Team	CAL	CHI	LAK	MIN	PHI	PIT	STL	Total
Boston	4–2	4–1–1	4–1–1	5–0–1	6–0	2–1–3	4–1–1	29–6–7
Buffalo	0–3–3	2–3–1	2–3–1	2–2–2	2–2–2	2–1–3	1–4–1	11–18–13
Detroit	2–2–2	0–5–1	3–2–1	2–4	3–2–1	4–2	2–3–1	16–20–6
Montreal	3–0–3	2–1–3	5–0–1	4–1–1	3–2–1	4–1–1	4–1–1	25–6–11
New York	4–1–1	2–1–3	6–0	1–3–2	6–0	3–1–2	5–1	27–7–8
Toronto	3–2–1	0–4–2	4–1–1	2–2–2	2–2–2	4–2	4–2	19–15–8
Vancouver	4–2	2–3–1	0–5–1	2–3–1	1–5	2–4	3–2–1	14–24–4

== Schedule and results ==
1971–72 regular season
October: 4–7–2 (home: 2–5–1; road: 2–2–1)

#	Date	Visitor	Score	Home	Record	Pts
1	October 8	Toronto	3–2	Vancouver	0–1–0	0
2	October 10	Los Angeles	4–2	Vancouver	0–2–0	0
3	October 12	Philadelphia	2–3	Vancouver	1–2–0	2
4	October 15	Vancouver	9–6	California	2–2–0	4
5	October 16	Pittsburgh	2–1	Vancouver	2–3–0	4
6	October 19	Vancouver	3–1	St. Louis	3–3–0	6
7	October 20	Vancouver	0–7	Minnesota	3–4–0	6
8	October 22	Montreal	6–0	Vancouver	3–5–0	6
9	October 24	Boston	4–3	Vancouver	3–6–0	6
10	October 27	Vancouver	0–0	Toronto	3–6–1	7
11	October 28	Vancouver	2–3	Philadelphia	3–7–1	7
12	October 30	Buffalo	4–4	Vancouver	3–7–2	8
13	October 31	Chicago	2–6	Vancouver	4–7–2	10

November: 3–7–2 (home: 3–2–1; road: 0–5–1)

#	Date	Visitor	Score	Home	Record	Pts
14	November 5	Pittsburgh	2–4	Vancouver	5–7–2	12
15	November 6	New York	3–1	Vancouver	5–8–2	12
16	November 10	Vancouver	1–3	Pittsburgh	5–9–2	12
17	November 11	Vancouver	3–4	Philadelphia	5–10–2	12
18	November 13	Vancouver	2–2	Toronto	5–10–3	13
19	November 14	Vancouver	1–6	New York	5–11–3	13
20	November 17	Vancouver	0–3	Chicago	5–12–3	13
21	November 18	Vancouver	0–5	Boston	5–13–3	13
22	November 21	Detroit	2–2	Vancouver	5–13–4	14
23	November 23	Minnesota	2–1	Vancouver	5–14–4	14
24	November 27	Buffalo	2–5	Vancouver	6–14–4	16
25	November 30	Chicago	2–4	Vancouver	7–14–4	18

December: 2–8–0 (home: 2–3–0; road: 0–5–0)

#	Date	Visitor	Score	Home	Record	Pts
26	December 4	Vancouver	0–7	Montreal	7–15–4	18
27	December 5	Vancouver	3–6	New York	7–16–4	18
28	December 7	St. Louis	1–2	Vancouver	8–16–4	20
29	December 11	Boston	6–2	Vancouver	8–17–4	20
30	December 14	Detroit	4–3	Vancouver	8–18–4	20
31	December 17	Monreal	6–2	Vancouver	8–19–4	20
32	December 19	Vancouver	1–5	Buffalo	8–20–4	20
33	December 22	Vancouver	0–3	Detroit	8–21–4	20
34	December 26	California	2–6	Vancouver	9–21–4	22
35	December 29	Vancouver	1–3	Los Angeles	9–22–4	22

January: 5–6–1 (home: 3–2–1; road: 2–4–0)

#	Date	Visitor	Score	Home	Record	Pts
36	January 2	Los Angeles	6–3	Vancouver	9–23–4	22
37	January 5	Vancouver	4–6	Montreal	9–24–4	22
38	January 8	Vancouver	5–1	Minnesota	10–24–4	24
39	January 11	Minnesota	2–2	Vancouver	10–24–5	25
40	January 14	Vancouver	3–5	California	10–25–5	25
41	January 15	California	3–4	Vancouver	11–25–5	27
42	January 19	Vancouver	6–1	Pittsburgh	12–25–5	29
43	January 20	Vancouver	0–1	Buffalo	12–26–5	29
44	January 22	New York	2–5	Vancouver	13–26–5	31
45	January 27	Vancouver	0–4	Chicago	13–27–5	31
46	January 29	Toronto	2–5	Vancouver	14–27–5	33
47	January 30	California	2–0	Vancouver	14–28–5	33

February: 2–12–1 (home: 1–5–0; road: 1–7–1)

#	Date	Visitor	Score	Home	Record	Pts
48	February 2	Vancouver	5–1	California	15–28–5	35
49	February 4	Chicago	6–2	Vancouver	15–29–5	35
50	February 6	Montreal	4–2	Vancouver	15–30–5	35
51	February 8	Philadelphia	3–1	Vancouver	15–31–5	35
52	February 10	Vancouver	1–9	Boston	15–32–5	35
53	February 12	Vancouver	4–5	St. Louis	15–33–5	35
54	February 13	Vancouver	4–6	Pittsburgh	15–34–5	35
55	February 15	New York	5–1	Vancouver	15–35–5	35
56	February 18	St. Louis	2–5	Vancouver	16–35–5	37
57	February 19	Vancouver	3–5	Los Angeles	16–36–5	37
58	February 22	Boston	4–3	Vancouver	16–37–5	37
59	February 24	Vancouver	0–2	Detroit	16–38–5	37
60	February 26	Vancouver	1–7	Toronto	16–39–5	37
61	February 27	Vancouver	3–3	Chicago	16–39–6	38
62	February 29	Vancouver	2–8	Detroit	16–40–6	38

March: 3–10–2 (home: 2–3–1; road: 1–7–1)

#	Date	Visitor	Score	Home	Record	Pts
63	March 2	Vancouver	3–7	Boston	16–41–6	38
64	March 4	Vancouver	0–5	Montreal	16–42–6	38
65	March 5	Vancouver	1–6	New York	16–43–6	38
66	March 8	Philadelphia	6–5	Vancouver	16–44–6	38
67	March 10	Buffalo	2–3	Vancouver	17–44–6	40
68	March 14	Pittsburgh	7–4	Vancouver	17–45–6	40
69	March 16	Vancouver	2–6	Minnesota	17–46–6	40
70	March 17	Vancouver	6–2	Buffalo	18–46–6	42
71	March 19	St. Louis	3–3	Vancouver	18–46–7	43
72	March 21	Detroit	7–5	Vancouver	18–47–7	43
73	March 24	Toronto	3–5	Vancouver	19–47–7	45
74	March 26	Vancouver	1–4	Philadelphia	19–48–7	45
75	March 28	Vancouver	1–2	St. Louis	19–49–7	45
76	March 29	Vancouver	2–4	Los Angeles	19–50–7	45
77	March 31	Los Angeles	4–4	Vancouver	19–50–8	46

April: 1–0–0 (home: 1–0–0; road: 0–0–0)

#	Date	Visitor	Score	Home	Record	Pts
78	April 2	Minnesota	1–4	Vancouver	20–50–8	48

Legend: Win (2 points) Loss (0 points) Tie (1 point)

== Player statistics ==
=== Skaters ===
Note: GP = Games played; G = Goals; A = Assists; Pts = Points; PIM = Penalty minutes

		Regular season					Playoffs
Player	#	GP	G	A	Pts	PIM	GP	G	A	Pts	PIM
Andre Boudrias	7	78	27	34	61	26	--	–	–	–	–
Orland Kurtenbach	25	78	24	37	61	48	–	–	–	–	–
Jocelyn Guevremont	2	75	13	38	51	44	–	–	–	–	–
Wayne Maki	11	76	22	25	47	43	–	–	–	–	–
Dale Tallon	9	69	17	27	44	78	–	–	–	–	–
Dave Balon^{†}	21	59	19	19	38	21	–	–	–	–	–
Wayne Connelly^{†}	8	53	14	20	34	12	–	–	–	–	–
Rosaire Paiement	15	69	10	19	29	117	–	–	–	–	–
Dennis Kearns	6	73	3	26	29	59	–	–	–	–	–
Bobby Schmautz	14	60	12	13	25	82	–	–	–	–	–
Ted Taylor	16	69	9	13	22	88	–	–	–	–	–
Richard Lemieux	–	42	7	9	16	4	–	–	–	–	–
John Schella	5	77	2	13	15	166	–	–	–	–	–
Murray Hall	23	32	6	6	12	6	–	–	–	–	–
Mike Corrigan*	–	19	3	4	7	27	–	–	–	–	–
Gregg Boddy	–	40	2	5	7	45	–	–	–	–	–
Barry Wilkins	4	45	2	5	7	65	–	–	–	–	–
Ron Ward	17	71	2	4	6	4	–	–	–	–	–
Bobby Lalonde	–	27	1	5	6	2	–	–	–	–	–
Pat Quinn	3	57	2	3	5	53	–	–	–	–	–
Ron Stewart*	12	42	3	1	4	10	–	–	–	–	–
Dan Johnson*	–	11	1	3	4	0	–	–	–	–	–
Fred Speck	10	18	1	2	3	0	–	–	–	–	–
Poul Popiel	18	38	1	1	2	36	–	–	–	–	–
Gary Doak*	–	5	0	1	1	23	–	–	–	–	–
Ed Dyck	–	12	0	0	0	0	–	–	–	–	–
George Gardner	30	24	0	0	0	0	–	–	–	–	–
Dunc Wilson	1	53	0	0	0	15	–	–	–	–	–

^{†}Denotes player spent time with another team before joining Vancouver. Stats reflect time with the Canucks only.

*Denotes player traded by Vancouver midway through the season. Stats reflect time with Canucks only.

=== Goaltenders ===
Note: GP = Games played; Min = Minutes; W = Wins; L = Losses; T = Ties; GA = Goals against; SO = Shutouts; GAA = Goals against average

		Regular season								Playoffs
Player	#	GP	Min	W	L	T	GA	SO	GAA	GP	Min	W	L	GA	SO	GAA
Dunc Wilson	1	53	3870	16	30	3	173	1	3.61	–	–	–	–	–	–	–
Ed Dyck	–	12	573	1	6	2	35	0	3.66	–	–	–	–	–	–	–
George Gardner	30	24	1237	3	14	3	86	0	4.17	–	–	–	–	–	–	–

== Awards and records ==
=== Trophies and awards ===
- Cyclone Taylor Award (Canucks MVP): Orland Kurtenbach
- Cyrus H. McLean Trophy (Canucks Leading Scorer): Andre Boudrias, Orland Kurtenbach
- Fred J. Hume Award (Canucks Unsung Hero): Ron Ward
- Most Exciting Player: Andre Boudrias

=== Records achieved in the season ===
==== Canucks team records ====
- Fewest points overall: (48) – repeated in 1994–95
- Fewest road points: (15) – repeated in 1972–73
- Fewest wins overall: (20) – (18 in shortened 1994–95 season)
- Most losses overall: (50)
- Most road losses: (30)
- Fewest ties overall: (8) – repeated in 1970–71, 1986–87, 1988–89
- Most shutouts against: (12)

== Transactions ==
The Canucks were involved in the following transactions during the 1971–72 season.

=== Trades ===
June 8, 1971	To Vancouver Canucks Gary Bredin; John Cunniff	To Detroit Red Wings Irv Spencer; Bob Dillabough
September 14, 1971	To Vancouver Canucks Rey Comeau	To Montreal Canadiens Cash
November 16, 1971	To Vancouver Canucks Ron Stewart; Wayne Connelly; Dave Balon	To New York Rangers Gary Doak; Jim Wiste
November 21, 1971	To Vancouver Canucks Cash	To Detroit Red Wings Bob Cook
March 5, 1972	To Vancouver Canucks Cash	To New York Rangers Ron Stewart
March 6, 1972	To Vancouver Canucks Jim Niekamp	To Detroit Red Wings Ralph Stewart

== Draft picks ==
Vancouver's picks at the 1971 NHL amateur draft, held at the Queen Elizabeth Hotel in Montreal.

Round	#	Player	Nationality	College/junior/club team (league)
1	3	Jocelyn Guevremont (D)	Canada	Montreal Junior Canadiens (OHA)
2	17	Bobby Lalonde (C)	Canada	Montreal Junior Canadiens (OHA)
3	39	Richard Lemieux (C)	Canada	Montreal Junior Canadiens (OHA)
5	59	Mike McNiven (RW)	Canada	Halifax Juniors
6	73	Tim Steeves (D)	Canada	PEI Islanders (Junior)
7	87	Bill Green	United States	Notre Dame (NCAA)
8	101	Norm Cherrey	Canada	Wisconsin (NCAA)
8	102	Bob Murphy	Canada	Cornwall Royals (QMJHL)

== See also ==
- 1971–72 NHL season
