= 1972 Memorial Cup =

1972 Canadian junior men's ice hockey championship

Tournament details
- Venue(s): Ottawa Civic Centre (Ottawa, Ontario)
- Dates: May 8–14, 1972
- Teams: 3

Final positions
- Champions: Cornwall Royals (QMJHL) (1st title)

The Memorial Cup trophy

The 1972 Memorial Cup occurred May 8–14 at the Ottawa Civic Centre in Ottawa, Ontario, Canada. It was the 54th annual Memorial Cup competition, organized by the Canadian Amateur Hockey Association (CAHA) to determine the champion of major junior A ice hockey. Participating teams were the winners of the Ontario Hockey Association, Quebec Major Junior Hockey League and Western Hockey League which were the Peterborough Petes, Cornwall Royals and Edmonton Oil Kings. Cornwall won their 1st Memorial Cup, defeating Peterborough in the final game.

The format for the Memorial Cup finals was changed from an Eastern Canada versus Western Canada final, into a round-robin format involving three league champions. CAHA past-president Earl Dawson served as chairman of the 1972 event. Coaches of the three league champions were opposed to the new format, and felt that a short series put extra pressure on players and lacked the environment of a home game during the playoffs. Despite the initial criticism, the new format became financially viable and was retained until the 1983 Memorial Cup when a fourth team was added.

== Teams ==
QMJHL Team OHA Team WCHL Team Host City

=== Cornwall Royals ===
The Cornwall Royals represented the Quebec Major Junior Hockey League at the 1972 Memorial Cup. The Royals had the best record in the QMJHL during the 1971-72 season at 47-13-2, earning 96 points, and the Jean Rougeau Trophy, awarded to the regular season champions of the league. Cornwall led the QMJHL with 361 goals for, and allowed the fewest goals against with 182. In the QMJHL quarter-finals, the Royals swept the Verdun Maple Leafs in four games. In the QMJHL semi-finals, Cornwall defeated the Shawinigan Bruins four games to one, advancing to the President's Cup. In the QMJHL finals against the Quebec Remparts, the Royals won the series with four wins, two losses and a tie, winning the league championship, and earning a berth at the 1972 Memorial Cup.

Gerry Teeple led the Royals offensively, scoring a team high 57 goals and 128 points in 56 games. Teeple won the Frank J. Selke Memorial Trophy, awarded to the Most Sportsmanlike Player in the League. His 128 points ranked him fourth in the league scoring race. Blair MacDonald had a very solid season, scoring 45 goals and 90 points in 61 games, becoming one of the top prospects in junior hockey. During the season, the Royals acquired Dave Johnson from the Verdun Maple Leafs. In 47 games with Cornwall, Johnson scored 42 goals and 81 points. Johnson led the Royals in post-season scoring, earning 11 goals and 23 points in 16 games. Rookie defenseman Bob Murray scored 14 goals and 63 points in 62 games, winning the Michel Bergeron Trophy as Rookie of the Year. In goal, the Royals were led by Richard Brodeur, who finished the season with a 43-13-2 record with a 2.91 GAA and a .914 save percentage. Brodeur was awarded the Jacques Plante Memorial Trophy as the top goaltender in the QMJHL.

The 1972 Memorial Cup represented the first time in club history that the Royals would compete for the trophy.

=== Edmonton Oil Kings ===
The Edmonton Oil Kings represented the Western Canada Hockey League at the 1972 Memorial Cup. The Oil Kings had a very successful regular season during the 1971-72, earning a record of 44-22-2 for 90 points, and second place in the West Division. Edmonton was the third highest scoring team in the WCHL with 320 goals. The Oil Kings allowed 246 goals, which ranked them in fourth. The Oil Kings opened the post-season with a four-game to one West Division semi-finals victory over the New Westminster Bruins. In the West Division finals against the first place Calgary Centennials, the Oil Kings completed the upset, winning four games to two, advancing to the WCHL finals. In the final round, the Oil Kings defeated the Regina Pats four games to one to win the President's Cup, and earning a berth in the 1972 Memorial Cup.

Don Kozak led the Oil Kings with 55 goals and 105 points in 68 games during the regular season. Darcy Rota also cracked the 50 goal and 100 point plateau, as Rota scored 51 goals and tied Kozak for the team lead in points with 105. Fred Comrie scored 20 goals and 71 points in 66 games, finishing third in the team scoring race, while Terry Smith scored 33 goals and 59 points in 66 games. Brian Ogilvie, acquired by the Oil Kings from the Vancouver Nats during the regular season, scored 23 goals and 55 points in 33 games with Edmonton. Defenceman Phil Russell led the defence with 14 goals, 59 points and 331 penalty minutes in 65 games. In goal, the Oil Kings split goaltending duties between Doug Soetaert and Larry Hendrick.

The 1972 Memorial Cup was the fourth time in team history that the Oil Kings competed for the Cup. The club had won the Memorial Cup twice, in 1963 and 1966. Edmonton also participated in the 1954 Memorial Cup, where the lost in the finals.

=== Peterborough Petes ===
The Peterborough Petes represented the Ontario Hockey Association at the 1972 Memorial Cup tournament. The Petes had a solid regular season, earning a record of 34-20-9 for 77 points, and finished third in the ten team league. The Petes scored 292 goals, which ranked them fourth in the OHA, while the club allowed 227 goals, the second fewest in the league. In the post-season, Peterborough defeated the St. Catharines Black Hawks eight points to two in the OHA quarter-finals. In the OHA semi-finals, Peterborough faced the best team in the league, the Toronto Marlboros. The Petes defeated the heavily favoured Marlboros eight points to two, setting up a match-up against the Ottawa 67's in the final round. Peterborough won the J. Ross Robertson Cup, defeating the 67's eight points to zero, earning a berth in the 1972 Memorial Cup.

The Petes offence was led by Doug Gibson, who led the club with 51 goals and 99 points in 63 games. Gibson's goal total was the sixth highest in the league. Gibson continued to score in the post-season, earning 16 goals and 29 points in 15 games to lead the club in scoring. Paul Raymer scored 27 goals and 69 points in 49 games, while Ron Lalonde earned 26 goals and 63 points in 58 games. Defenceman Bob Neely was acquired by the Petes during the regular season in a trade with the Hamilton Red Wings. Neely led the Petes defence with eight goals and 30 points in 32 games. Colin Campbell provided toughness on the blue line, as in 50 games, he scored two goals and 25 points, as well as registering 158 penalty minutes. Mike Veisor handled the goaltending duties for the Petes. In 15 post-season games, Veisor had a GAA of 2.13.

The 1972 Memorial Cup was the second time that the Petes competed for the Cup. At the 1959 Memorial Cup, Peterborough lost to the Winnipeg Braves.

== Round-robin standings ==
Pos	Team	Pld	W	L	GF	GA	
1	Peterborough Petes (OHA)	2	2	0	10	6	Advanced to final
2	Cornwall Royals (QMJHL)	2	1	1	7	4	Advanced to final
3	Edmonton Oil Kings (WHL)	2	0	2	4	11	

== Scores ==
Round-robin

- May 8 Peterborough 4-2 Cornwall
- May 10 Peterborough 6-4 Edmonton
- May 12 Cornwall 5-0 Edmonton

Final

- May 14 Cornwall 2-1 Peterborough

=== Winning roster ===
1971-72 Cornwall Royals
Goaltenders: 1 – Richard Brodeur; 30 – Tom Wynne	Defencemen: 3 – Ron Smith; 4 – Bob Murray - C; 5 – Pierre Viau; 6 – Al Sims; 20 – Brian Bowles; 21 – Robbie Bingley	Wingers: 2 – Brian McCullough - A; 7 – Michel Renaud; 8 – Blair MacDonald; 10 – Kevin Treacy; 11 – Yvon Blais; 12 – John Wensink; 14 – Dave Johnson; 15 – Robert Geoffrion; 22 – Stuart Davison; 27 – John Nazar	Centres: 9 – Gary MacGregor - A; 17 – Tony McCarthy; 18 – Dan Lupenette; 19 – Gerry Teeple; Coach: Orval Tessier; General Manager: Jim Larin

== Award winners ==
- Stafford Smythe Memorial Trophy (MVP): Richard Brodeur, Cornwall

== Bibliography ==
- Lapp, Richard M.; Macaulay, Alec (1997). The Memorial Cup: Canada's National Junior Hockey Championship. Madeira Park, British Columbia: Harbour Publishing. ISBN 1-55017-170-4.
