= 1971 Memorial Cup =

Canadian junior ice hockey championship

Tournament details
- Venue(s): Colisée de Québec (Quebec City, Quebec)
- Dates: May 1971
- Teams: 4

Final positions
- Champions: Quebec Remparts (QMJHL) (1st title)

The Memorial Cup trophy

The 1971 Memorial Cup was the 53rd annual Memorial Cup competition, organized by the Canadian Amateur Hockey Association (CAHA) to determine the champion of major junior A ice hockey. It was a best-of-three series between the Quebec Remparts of the Quebec Major Junior Hockey League (QMJHL) and the Edmonton Oil Kings of the Western Canada Hockey League (WCHL). Quebec won the series in two games, both held at the Colisée de Québec, to win the first Memorial Cup championship in the city's history.

The national playdowns were marred by controversy as the Remparts advanced to the championship series when the Ontario Hockey Association's (OHA) St. Catharines Black Hawks forfeited the eastern championship series after five games rather than return to Quebec City for a sixth game in the face of a hostile and violent crowd and threats from the Front de libération du Québec. The Remparts agreed to a challenge from the Oil Kings for an abbreviated national championship and a best-of-three series to be held rather than the typical best-of-seven.

== National playdowns ==
The Canadian Amateur Hockey Association (CAHA) reorganized junior A hockey prior to this season, splitting this top level into two tiers. The OHA, QMJHL and WCHL formed the "Tier I Major Junior A" rank (simply "Major Junior" starting in 1980). The Memorial Cup became the national championship of the new tier. The remaining teams and leagues remained in the Junior A rank. A new championship, the Manitoba Centennial Trophy, was created for teams at this level.

The Memorial Cup tournament remained in an east versus west format for 1971. The champions of the OHA and QMJHL were to play for the Eastern championship and then face the WCHL winner for the national title. This format lasted only one year, as for 1972, the CAHA reorganized the Memorial Cup into a three-team round-robin tournament between the winner of each league.

=== East championship ===
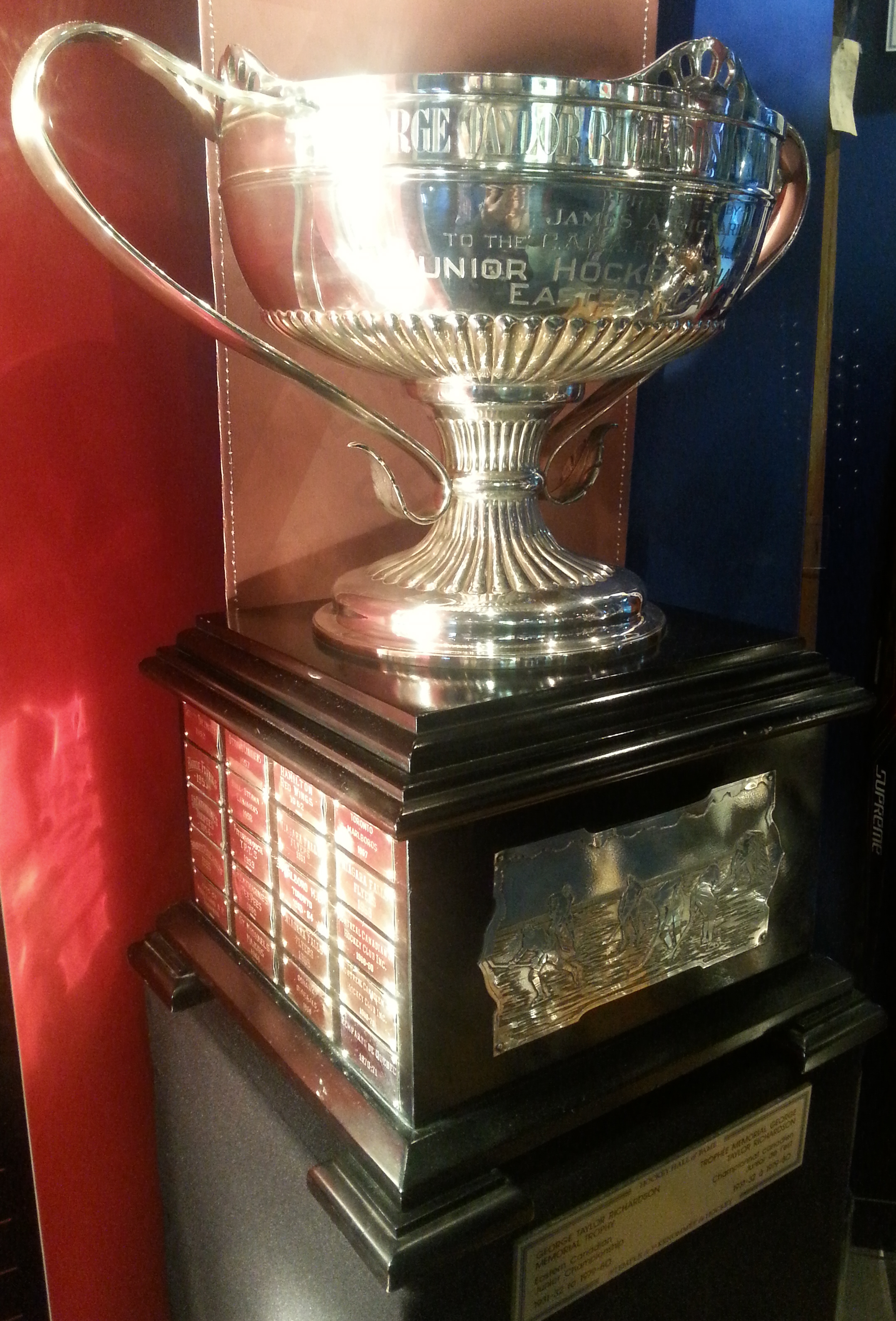
The George Richardson Memorial Trophy was the championship trophy for junior ice hockey in Eastern Canada.

The Remparts were led by Guy Lafleur, who in 1970–71 set league records with 130 goals and 209 points. He added another 22 goals in the playoffs to lead Quebec to the QMJHL's President's Cup championship. In a best-of-seven series for the Eastern championship, they faced OHA champion St. Catharines, led by Marcel Dionne, who was the Ontario league's top scorer with 143 points. The teams split the first two games, held in St. Catharines, before the Remparts took a 2–1 series lead in the third game, held in Quebec. The game was violent at times with over 102 penalties in minutes given out by the referee – 77 to the Black Hawks.

Quebec moved to within one win of winning the series with a 6–1 victory in game four, also held in Quebec. As with the third game, the Black Hawks attempted to intimidate their smaller Remparts opponents physically. The crowd grew increasingly hostile towards the visitors, pelting the players with eggs, potatoes and golf balls, while one fan threw a knife. Dionne's parents were assaulted in the stands over the fact that he had left the Quebec league to play in Ontario. Mike Bloom inadvertently struck a police officer with his stick trying to hit a fan who spat on him. The Black Hawk players were escorted out of the building by police following the game as a mob of angry fans threw bottles at them and then milled around the team's motel until the early hours of the following morning. Threats were made against the players by the Quebec Liberation Front, a group that precipitated the October Crisis of 1970 that resulted in the Canadian government invoking the War Measures Act.

The fifth game was held in a neutral location. St. Catharines defeated Quebec 6–3 at Maple Leaf Gardens in Toronto, but refused to return to Quebec City for the sixth and seventh games. The Black Hawks offered to play the remainder of the series in Montreal, which the Remparts refused. Fearing for their safety, the players voted to forfeit the sixth game. CAHA president Earl Dawson then declared the series a forfeit in favour of Quebec.

=== West championship ===
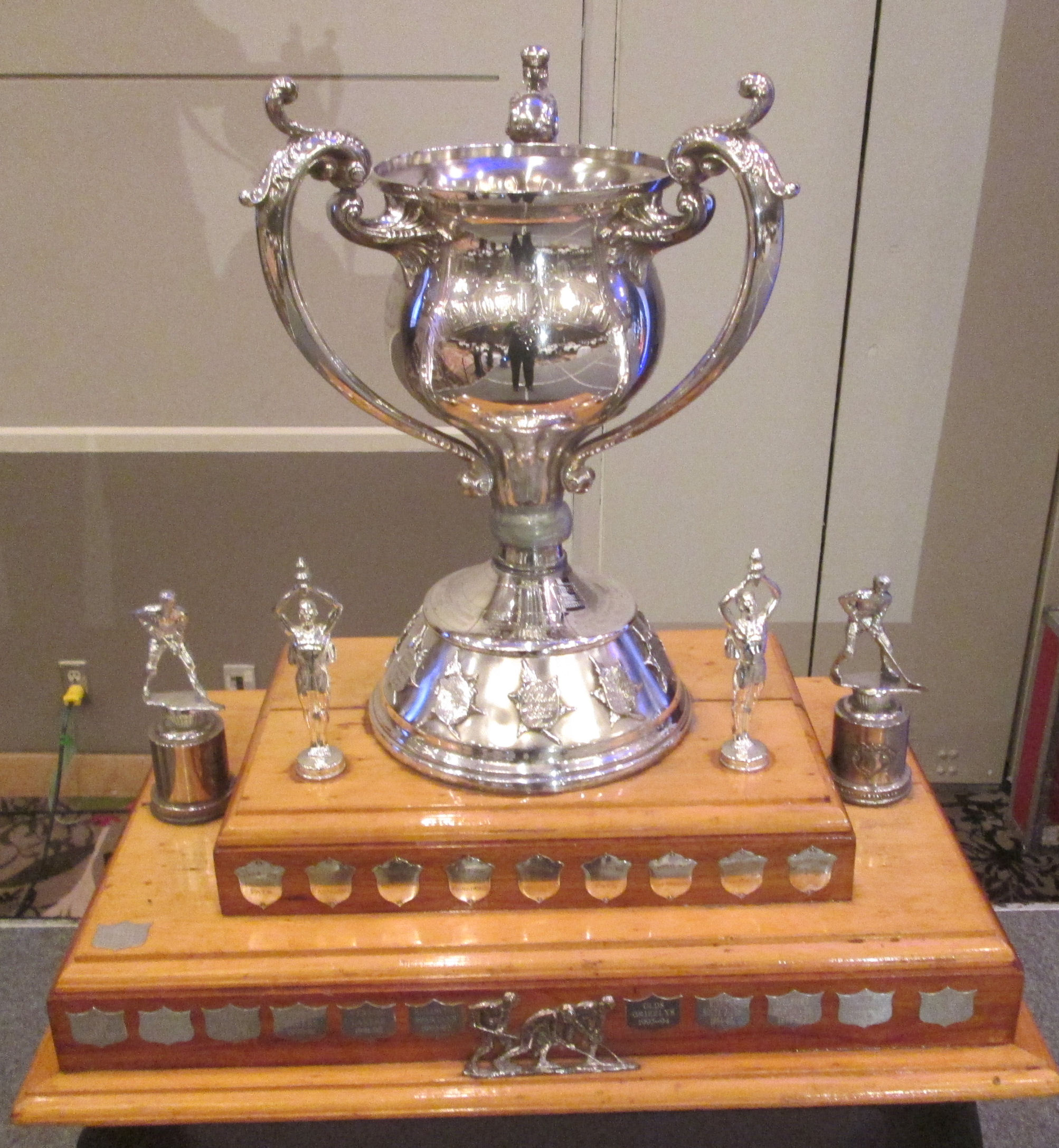
The Abbott Cup was the championship trophy for junior ice hockey in Western Canada.

In the west, The Edmonton Oil Kings were led by 60-goal scorer Don Kozak and 43-goal scorers Darcy Rota and Dan Spring. They won the Western Canada Hockey League championship over the Flin Flon Bombers four games to one, with one tie. They had previously eliminated the Saskatoon Blades in five games and then the Calgary Centennials in six.

It was the first Western championship for the Oil Kings since they made seven consecutive appearances in the Memorial Cup between 1960 and 1966. Their streak ended when they helped create the WCHL in 1966 over the objection of the CAHA who declared them outlaws and ineligible to compete for the national championship. The WCHL gained CAHA sanction prior to the 1970–71 season, allowing the Oil Kings to return to the Memorial Cup Final.

== Memorial Cup final ==
In August 1970, OHA president Tubby Schmalz announced that teams from the OHA and the QMJHL would not play against any team from the WCHL for the 1971 Memorial Cup, due to disagreements over travel allowances given to team at the Memorial Cup and the higher number of over-age players allowed on WCHL rosters. Nonetheless, the Oil Kings extended a challenge to the Eastern champion and proposed a best-of-seven series to open in the east, then move to Edmonton for two games and then finish out east. The eastern leagues were also upset that the CAHA offered a $10,000 travel subsidy to the western champion for the Memorial Cup vs. $6,000 to the eastern champion.

Oil Kings' owner, general manager and coach, Bill Hunter, implored the eastern leagues to participate in a championship series calling it the "burning ambition" of all Canadian junior players while invoking the actions of the government during the October Crisis: "If the Prime Minister wants to do something right for the west for a change, he'll use the War Measures Act to enforce a Memorial Cup final." The Oil Kings and the Remparts agreed to a shortened best-of-three series for the Memorial Cup, with all games in Quebec as approved by the CAHA and Earl Dawson.

Edmonton was met by a much different crowd when they arrived in Quebec City than the one St. Catharines faced. A crowd of 2,000 people welcomed the Oil Kings at the airport as they arrived. Quebec won the first game easily, 5–1, on the strength of four points by Lafleur. The Remparts then won the title with a 5–2 victory in the second game before a crowd of 11,401. It was the first Memorial Cup championship for the Remparts, and the first for Quebec City.

== Players ==
Lafleur was hailed by the fans in Quebec as the best junior player in the world, and was selected first overall by the Montreal Canadiens in the 1971 NHL entry draft three weeks after winning the Memorial Cup. He won five Stanley Cup championships in Montreal as part of a Hall of Fame career. Lafleur's teammates Jacques Richard, Andre Savard, Richard Grenier and Charlie Constantin also went on to play in the National Hockey League.

Darcy Rota, Tom Bladon and Phil Russel went on to long NHL careers after graduating from the Oil Kings. Dave Kryskow, Ron Jones and John Rogers also went on to play in the NHL after leaving Edmonton. Marcel Dionne was selected second overall by the Detroit Red Wings from the St. Catharines Black Hawks in 1971 and played 18 years before joining Lafleur in the Hall of Fame.

=== Winning roster ===
1970-71 Quebec Remparts
Goaltenders: – Michel DeGuise; 1 – Serge Gaudreault; 30 – Raynald Fortier	Defencemen: 2 – Jean Landry; 3 – Pierre Roy; 6 – Paul Dion; 19 – Richard Perron; 21 – Bill Landers	Wingers: 4 – Guy Lafleur - C; 7 – Pierre Duguay; 8 – Rene Lambert; 9 – Michel Briere; 10 – Rejean Giroux; 14 – Jean Lamarre; 15 – Jacques Richard; 22 – Charles Constantin	Centres: 11 – Richard Grenier; 12 – Andre Savard; 16 – Yves Lacroix; 18 – Jacques Locas; Coach: Maurice Filion; General Manager: Paul Dumont

== National playoff tree ==
Number in parentheses indicates number of tie game.

Semifinals
OHA	St. Catharines Black Hawks	2
QMJHL	Quebec Remparts	3
WCHL	Edmonton Oil Kings	4 (1)
WCHL	Flin Flon Bombers	1 (1)

Finals
QMJHL	Quebec Remparts	2
WCHL	Edmonton Oil Kings	0

== Bibliography ==
- Lapp, Richard M.; Macaulay, Alec (1997). The Memorial Cup: Canada's National Junior Hockey Championship. Madeira Park, British Columbia: Harbour Publishing. ISBN 1-55017-170-4.
