= 1971–72 New York Rangers season =

NHL hockey team season

1971–72 New York Rangers
- Division: 2nd East
- 1971–72 record: 48–17–13
- Home record: 26–6–7
- Road record: 22–11–6
- Goals for: 317
- Goals against: 192

Team information
- General manager: Emile Francis
- Coach: Emile Francis
- Captain: Vic Hadfield
- Alternate captains: Jim Neilson; Rod Gilbert
- Arena: Madison Square Garden

Team leaders
- Goals: Vic Hadfield (50)
- Assists: Jean Ratelle (63)
- Points: Jean Ratelle (109)
- Penalty minutes: Vic Hadfield (142)
- Wins: Gilles Villemure, Ed Giacomin (24)
- Goals against average: Gilles Villemure (2.09)

The 1971–72 New York Rangers season was the franchise's 46th season. Jean Ratelle, Vic Hadfield, and Rod Gilbert ranked third, fourth and fifth overall in league scoring. The Rangers qualified for the postseason for the sixth consecutive season. The club made its first appearance in the Stanley Cup Final since 1950 but lost in six games to the Boston Bruins.

== Regular season ==
=== Final standings ===
East Division
		GP	W	L	T	GF	GA	DIFF	Pts
1	Boston Bruins	78	54	13	11	330	204	+126	119
2	New York Rangers	78	48	17	13	317	192	+125	109
3	Montreal Canadiens	78	46	16	16	307	205	+102	108
4	Toronto Maple Leafs	78	33	31	14	209	208	+1	80
5	Detroit Red Wings	78	33	35	10	261	262	−1	76
6	Buffalo Sabres	78	16	43	19	203	289	−86	51
7	Vancouver Canucks	78	20	50	8	203	297	−94	48

=== Record vs. opponents ===
==== Vs. East Division ====
1971–72 NHL records
Team	BOS	BUF	DET	MTL	NYR	TOR	VAN	Total
Boston	—	3–1–2	5–1	2–3–1	5–1	4–1–1	6–0	25–7–4
Buffalo	1–3–2	—	0–4–2	1–4–1	0–6	1–5	2–3–1	5–25–6
Detroit	1–5	4–0–2	—	3–3	1–4–1	3–3	5–0–1	17–15–4
Montreal	3–2–1	4–1–1	3–3	—	1–3–2	4–1–1	6–0	21–10–5
New York	1–5	6–0	4–1–1	3–1–2	—	2–2–2	5–1	21–10–5
Toronto	1–4–1	5–1	3–3	1–4–1	2–2–2	—	2–2–2	14–16–6
Vancouver	0–6	3–2–1	0–5–1	0–6	1–5	2–2–2	—	6–26–4

==== Vs. West Division ====
1971–72 NHL records
Team	CAL	CHI	LAK	MIN	PHI	PIT	STL	Total
Boston	4–2	4–1–1	4–1–1	5–0–1	6–0	2–1–3	4–1–1	29–6–7
Buffalo	0–3–3	2–3–1	2–3–1	2–2–2	2–2–2	2–1–3	1–4–1	11–18–13
Detroit	2–2–2	0–5–1	3–2–1	2–4	3–2–1	4–2	2–3–1	16–20–6
Montreal	3–0–3	2–1–3	5–0–1	4–1–1	3–2–1	4–1–1	4–1–1	25–6–11
New York	4–1–1	2–1–3	6–0	1–3–2	6–0	3–1–2	5–1	27–7–8
Toronto	3–2–1	0–4–2	4–1–1	2–2–2	2–2–2	4–2	4–2	19–15–8
Vancouver	4–2	2–3–1	0–5–1	2–3–1	1–5	2–4	3–2–1	14–24–4

== Schedule and results ==
1971–72 regular season
October: 6–1–4 (home: 3–1–2; road: 3–0–2)

Game	October	Opponent	Score	Record
1	9	@ Montreal Canadiens	4–4	0–0–1
2	10	@ Boston Bruins	4–1	1–0–1
3	13	Boston Bruins	6–1	1–1–1
4	16	@ Toronto Maple Leafs	5–3	2–1–1
5	17	Montreal Canadiens	8–4	3–1–1
6	20	Chicago Black Hawks	3–1	4–1–1
7	23	@ St. Louis Blues	4–3	5–1–1
8	24	Pittsburgh Penguins	1–1	5–1–2
9	27	Detroit Red Wings	7–4	6–1–2
10	30	@ Pittsburgh Penguins	1–1	6–1–3
11	31	Toronto Maple Leafs	3–3	6–1–4

November: 9–2–0 (home: 5–0–0; road: 4–2–0)

Game	November	Opponent	Score	Record
12	3	@ Los Angeles Kings	7–1	7–1–4
13	5	@ California Golden Seals	8–1	8–1–4
14	6	@ Vancouver Canucks	3–1	9–1–4
15	10	Los Angeles Kings	7–1	10–1–4
16	13	Buffalo Sabres	5–2	11–1–4
17	14	Vancouver Canucks	6–1	12–1–4
18	20	@ Minnesota North Stars	4–1	12–2–4
19	21	California Golden Seals	12–1	13–2–4
20	24	St. Louis Blues	8–3	14–2–4
21	27	@ Detroit Red Wings	3–1	14–3–4
22	28	@ Philadelphia Flyers	4–2	15–3–4

December: 10–2–2 (home: 7–0–1; road: 3–2–1)

Game	December	Opponent	Score	Record
23	1	Buffalo Sabres	7–2	16–3–4
24	4	@ Pittsburgh Penguins	4–2	16–4–4
25	5	Vancouver Canucks	6–3	17–4–4
26	8	@ Chicago Black Hawks	2–2	17–4–5
27	9	@ Philadelphia Flyers	5–0	18–4–5
28	12	Pittsburgh Penguins	6–1	19–4–5
29	15	Philadelphia Flyers	6–2	20–4–5
30	16	@ Boston Bruins	8–1	20–5–5
31	18	@ St. Louis Blues	5–2	21–5–5
32	19	Minnesota North Stars	1–1	21–5–6
33	22	Pittsburgh Penguins	4–2	22–5–6
34	25	@ Minnesota North Stars	2–1	23–5–6
35	26	Montreal Canadiens	5–1	24–5–6
36	29	Philadelphia Flyers	5–1	25–5–6

January: 6–4–2 (home: 3–1–1; road: 3–3–1)

Game	January	Opponent	Score	Record
37	2	Boston Bruins	4–1	25–6–6
38	5	St. Louis Blues	9–1	26–6–6
39	9	Los Angeles Kings	8–0	27–6–6
40	12	@ Chicago Black Hawks	5–5	27–6–7
41	13	@ Buffalo Sabres	5–2	28–6–7
42	15	@ Toronto Maple Leafs	4–3	28–7–7
43	19	@ Los Angeles Kings	5–1	29–7–7
44	21	@ California Golden Seals	5–0	30–7–7
45	22	@ Vancouver Canucks	5–2	30–8–7
46	26	Buffalo Sabres	5–1	31–8–7
47	29	@ Minnesota North Stars	4–2	31–9–7
48	30	Minnesota North Stars	1–1	31–9–8

February: 10–2–2 (home: 5–1–1; road: 5–1–1)

Game	February	Opponent	Score	Record
49	2	Boston Bruins	2–0	31–10–8
50	3	@ Buffalo Sabres	4–2	32–10–8
51	5	@ St. Louis Blues	6–5	32–11–8
52	6	Toronto Maple Leafs	2–2	32–11–9
53	9	Chicago Black Hawks	4–1	33–11–9
54	12	@ Pittsburgh Penguins	8–3	34–11–9
55	13	Los Angeles Kings	4–2	35–11–9
56	15	@ Vancouver Canucks	5–1	36–11–9
57	17	@ Los Angeles Kings	6–4	37–11–9
58	18	@ California Golden Seals	2–2	37–11–10
59	20	Detroit Red Wings	4–3	38–11–10
60	22	@ Montreal Canadiens	7–3	39–11–10
61	23	Philadelphia Flyers	4–3	40–11–10
62	27	St. Louis Blues	2–0	41–11–10

March: 7–4–3 (home: 3–2–2; road: 4–2–1)

Game	March	Opponent	Score	Record
63	1	California Golden Seals	4–1	42–11–10
64	2	@ Buffalo Sabres	4–3	43–11–10
65	5	Vancouver Canucks	6–1	44–11–10
66	8	Chicago Black Hawks	3–3	44–11–11
67	11	@ Detroit Red Wings	4–2	45–11–11
68	12	California Golden Seals	7–3	45–12–11
69	15	@ Chicago Black Hawks	3–1	45–13–11
70	16	@ Detroit Red Wings	2–1	46–13–11
71	18	@ Philadelphia Flyers	5–3	47–13–11
72	19	Toronto Maple Leafs	5–3	48–13–11
73	23	@ Boston Bruins	4–1	48–14–11
74	25	@ Montreal Canadiens	3–3	48–14–12
75	26	Minnesota North Stars	5–0	48–15–12
76	29	Detroit Red Wings	2–2	48–15–13

April: 0–2–0 (home: 0–1–0; road: 0–1–0)

Game	April	Opponent	Score	Record
77	1	@ Toronto Maple Leafs	2–1	48–16–13
78	2	Montreal Canadiens	6–5	48–17–13

Legend: Win (2 points) Loss (0 points) Tie (1 point)

== Playoffs ==
1972 Stanley Cup playoffs
Quarterfinals vs. (E3) Montreal Canadiens – Rangers win 4–2

Game	Date	Visitor	Score	Home	OT	Series
1	April 5	Montreal Canadiens	2–3	New York Rangers		New York Rangers lead series 1–0
2	April 6	Montreal Canadiens	2–5	New York Rangers		New York Rangers lead series 2–0
3	April 8	New York Rangers	1–2	Montreal Canadiens		New York Rangers lead series 2–1
4	April 9	New York Rangers	6–4	Montreal Canadiens		New York Rangers lead series 3–1
5	April 11	Montreal Canadiens	2–1	New York Rangers		New York Rangers lead series 3–2
6	April 13	New York Rangers	3–2	Montreal Canadiens		New York Rangers win series 4–2

Semifinals vs. (W1) Chicago Black Hawks – Rangers win 4–0

Game	Date	Visitor	Score	Home	OT	Series
1	April 16	New York Rangers	3–2	Chicago Black Hawks		New York Rangers lead series 1–0
2	April 18	New York Rangers	5–3	Chicago Black Hawks		New York Rangers lead series 2–0
3	April 20	Chicago Black Hawks	2–3	New York Rangers		New York Rangers lead series 3–0
4	April 23	Chicago Black Hawks	2–6	New York Rangers		New York Rangers win series 4–0

Stanley Cup Finals vs. (E1) Boston Bruins – Bruins win 4–2

Game	Date	Visitor	Score	Home	OT	Series
1	April 30	New York Rangers	5–6	Boston Bruins		Boston leads series 1–0
2	May 2	New York Rangers	1–2	Boston Bruins		Boston leads series 2–0
3	May 4	Boston Bruins	2–5	New York Rangers		Boston leads series 2–1
4	May 7	Boston Bruins	3–2	New York Rangers		Boston leads series 3–1
5	May 9	New York Rangers	3–2	Boston Bruins		Boston leads series 3–2
6	May 11	Boston Bruins	3–0	New York Rangers		Boston wins series 4–2

Legend: Win Loss

== Player statistics ==
Skaters

Regular season
Player	GP	G	A	Pts	PIM
Jean Ratelle	63	46	63	109	4
Vic Hadfield	78	50	56	106	142
Rod Gilbert	73	43	54	97	64
Brad Park	75	24	49	73	130
Walt Tkaczuk	76	24	42	66	65
Bill Fairbairn	78	22	37	59	53
Bobby Rousseau	78	21	36	57	12
Rod Seiling	78	5	36	41	62
Bruce MacGregor	75	19	21	40	22
Jim Neilson	78	7	30	37	56
Ted Irvine	78	15	21	36	66
Pete Stemkowski	59	11	17	28	53
Gene Carr^{†}	60	8	8	16	25
Dale Rolfe	68	2	14	16	67
Glen Sather	76	5	9	14	77
Ab DeMarco	48	4	7	11	4
Gary Doak^{†}	50	1	10	11	54
Dave Balon^{‡}	16	4	5	9	2
Pierre Jarry^{‡}	34	3	3	6	20
Phil Goyette^{†}	8	1	4	5	0
Jack Egers^{‡}	17	2	1	3	14
Ron Stewart^{†}	13	0	2	2	2
Norm Gratton	3	0	1	1	0
Mike McMahon	1	0	0	0	0
Jim Dorey^{†}	1	0	0	0	0
Tom Williams	3	0	0	0	2
Jim Lorentz^{†‡}	7	0	0	0	0

Playoffs
Player	GP	G	A	Pts	PIM
Bobby Rousseau	16	6	11	17	7
Vic Hadfield	16	7	9	16	22
Rod Gilbert	16	7	8	15	11
Pete Stemkowski	16	4	8	12	18
Bill Fairbairn	16	5	7	12	11
Brad Park	16	4	7	11	21
Walt Tkaczuk	16	4	6	10	35
Ted Irvine	16	4	5	9	19
Bruce MacGregor	16	2	6	8	4
Dale Rolfe	16	4	3	7	16
Rod Seiling	16	1	4	5	10
Phil Goyette	13	1	3	4	2
Gene Carr	16	1	3	4	21
Ron Stewart	8	2	1	3	0
Jim Neilson	10	0	3	3	8
Ab DeMarco	4	0	1	1	0
Glen Sather	16	0	1	1	22
Jean Ratelle	6	0	1	1	0
Jim Dorey	1	0	0	0	0
Steve Andrascik	1	0	0	0	0
Gary Doak	12	0	0	0	46

Goaltenders

Regular season
Player	GP	TOI	W	L	T	GA	GAA	SO
Ed Giacomin	44	2551	24	10	9	115	2.70	1
Gilles Villemure	37	2129	24	7	4	74	2.09	3

Playoffs
Player	GP	TOI	W	L	GA	GAA	SO
Ed Giacomin	10	600	6	4	27	2.70	0
Gilles Villemure	6	360	4	2	14	2.33	0

^{†}Denotes player spent time with another team before joining Rangers. Stats reflect time with Rangers only.
^{‡}Traded mid-season. Stats reflect time with Rangers only.

Note:

Pos = Position;GP = Games played; G = Goals; A = Assists; Pts = Points; PIM = Penalty minutes; +/- = Plus/minus; PPG = Power-play goals; SHG = Short-handed goals; GWG = Game-winning goals
Pos = Position;GP = Games played; Min, TOI = Minutes played; W = Wins; L = Losses; T,T/OT = Ties; OTL = Overtime losses; GA = Goals-against; GAA = Goals-against average; SO = Shutouts; SA = Shots against; SV = Shots saved;SV% = Save percentage;

== Draft picks ==
New York's picks at the 1971 NHL amateur draft in Montreal, Canada.

Round	#	Player	Position	Nationality	College/Junior/Club team (League)
1	10	Steve Vickers	LW	Canada	Toronto Marlboros (OHA)
1	13	Steve Durbano	D	Canada	Toronto Marlboros (OHA)
2	27	Tom Williams	LW	Canada	Hamilton Red Wings (OHA)
3	41	Terry West	C	Canada	London Knights (OHA)
4	55	Jerry Butler	RW	Canada	Hamilton Red Wings (OHA)
5	69	Fraser Robertson	D	Canada	Lethbridge Sugar Kings (AJHL)
6	83	Wayne Wood	G	Canada	Montreal Junior Canadiens (OHA)
7	96	Doug Keeler	C	Canada	Ottawa 67's (OHA)
7	97	Jean-Denis Royal	D	Canada	Saint-Jerome Alouettes (QMJHL)
8	109	Gene Sobchuk	LW	Canada	Regina Pats (WCHL)
9	110	Jim Ivison	D	Canada	Brandon Wheat Kings (WCHL)
10	111	Andre Peloffy	C	France	Rosemont National (QMJHL)
11	112	Elston Evoy	C	Canada	Sault Ste. Marie Greyhounds (NOHA)
12	114	Gerry Lecomte	D	Canada	Sherbrooke Beavers (QMJHL)
13	115	Wayne Forsey	LW	Canada	Swift Current Broncos (WCHL)
14	116	Bill Forrest	D	Canada	Hamilton Red Wings (OHA)
