= Norrish =

Norrish is a surname. Notable people with the surname include:

- Jason Norrish (born 1972), Australian rules footballer
- Merwyn Norrish (born 1926), New Zealand diplomat
- Rod Norrish (born 1951), Canadian ice hockey player
- Ronald George Wreyford Norrish (1897 – 1978), British chemist who was awarded the Nobel Prize in Chemistry in 1967. Norrish reactions are named after him
