= Ron Jones (ice hockey) =

Canadian ice hockey player (born 1951)

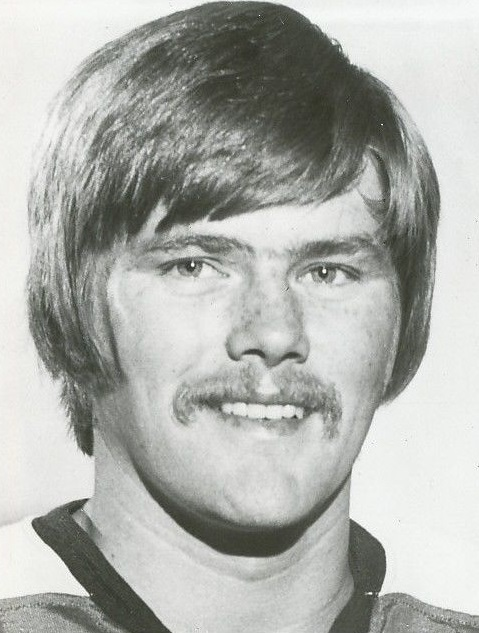
- Jones in 1973
- Born: April 11, 1951 (age 75) Vermilion, Alberta, Canada
- Height: 6 ft 2 in (188 cm)
- Weight: 190 lb (86 kg; 13 st 8 lb)
- Position: Defence
- Shot: Left
- Played for: Washington Capitals; Pittsburgh Penguins; Boston Bruins
- NHL draft: 6th overall, 1971; Boston Bruins
- Playing career: 1971–1977

Ronald Perry Jones (born April 11, 1951) is a Canadian former professional ice hockey defenceman.

Jones was born in Vermilion, Alberta. Selected by the Boston Bruins in the 1971 NHL entry draft, Jones played for the Bruins, Pittsburgh Penguins, and Washington Capitals between 1972 and 1976. The rest of his career was mainly spent in the minor American Hockey League.

== Career statistics ==
=== Regular season and playoffs ===
			Regular season					Playoffs
Season	Team	League	GP	G	A	Pts	PIM	GP	G	A	Pts	PIM
1967–68	Edmonton Oil Kings	WCHL	48	1	5	6	29	4	0	0	0	0
1968–69	Edmonton Oil Kings	WCHL	46	2	11	13	37	17	0	2	2	8
1969–70	Edmonton Oil Kings	WCHL	52	7	33	40	82	18	1	6	7	10
1969–70	Edmonton Oil Kings	M-Cup	—	—	—	—	—	2	0	1	1	6
1970–71	Edmonton Oil Kings	WCHL	63	11	40	51	46	17	2	13	15	16
1970–71	Edmonton Oil Kings	M-Cup	—	—	—	—	—	2	0	1	1	6
1971–72	Boston Bruins	NHL	1	0	0	0	0	—	—	—	—	—
1971–72	Boston Braves	AHL	74	6	11	17	36	9	0	0	0	7
1972–73	Boston Bruins	NHL	7	0	0	0	2	—	—	—	—	—
1972–73	Boston Braves	AHL	55	3	25	28	34	5	0	1	1	2
1973–74	Pittsburgh Penguins	NHL	25	0	3	3	15	—	—	—	—	—
1973–74	Hershey Bears	AHL	34	0	12	12	23	14	0	3	3	6
1974–75	Hershey Bears	AHL	25	0	6	6	37	—	—	—	—	—
1974–75	Washington Capitals	NHL	19	1	1	2	16	—	—	—	—	—
1975–76	Richmond Robins	AHL	20	0	7	7	8	—	—	—	—	—
1975–76	Washington Capitals	NHL	2	0	0	0	0	—	—	—	—	—
1975–76	Hershey Bears	AHL	53	7	23	30	34	10	1	5	6	9
1976–77	Hershey Bears	AHL	36	0	9	9	18	6	0	3	3	4
AHL totals			297	16	93	109	190	44	1	12	13	28
NHL totals			54	1	4	5	33	—	—	—	—	—

== Awards ==
- WCHL All-Star Team – 1971

Preceded by Bob Stewart	Boston Bruins first-round draft pick 1971	Succeeded by Terry O'Reilly
