= 1970–71 WCHL season =

Junior ice hockey season

- League: Western Hockey League
- Sport: Ice hockey
- Teams: 10

Regular season
- Season champions: Edmonton Oil Kings (2)
- Season MVP: Ed Dyck (Calgary Centennials)
- Top scorer: Chuck Arnason (Flin Flon Bombers)

Playoffs
- Finals champions: Edmonton Oil Kings (1)
- Runners-up: Flin Flon Bombers

WHL seasons
- 1969–70 1971–72

1970–71 Canadian major junior season
- Sport: Ice hockey
- Teams: 30

OHA

QMJHL

WCHL

Memorial Cup
- Finals champions: Quebec Remparts (QMJHL) (1st title)
- Runners-up: Edmonton Oil Kings (WCHL)

The 1970–71 WCHL season was the fifth season of the Western Canada Hockey League (WCHL). It featured ten teams and a 66-game regular season. For the second time in team history, the Edmonton Oil Kings topped the regular season standings, posting 45 wins on the season. In the playoffs, after losing the previous two league finals to the Flin Flon Bombers, the Oil Kings met the Bombers for a third straight season, this time winning the club's first President's Cup. On the national scene, the season was the first to be sanctioned by the Canadian Amateur Hockey Association under a new agreement signed in 1970, which included the participation of the WCHL champion in the Memorial Cup final. The Oil Kings thus advanced to the 1971 Memorial Cup final, which they lost to the Quebec Remparts.

== League business ==
=== Team changes ===
In January 1970, the Medicine Hat Tigers were approved as an expansion team for the 1970–71 season. In May, the Regina Pats were accepted for a return to the WCHL after two seasons in the Saskatchewan Junior Hockey League, which increased the WCHL to ten teams. League president Ron Butlin stated that the expansion draft was configured so that the new teams would be competitive in their first year. Established teams could protect six players from being selected.

=== Agreement with CAHA ===
After years of disputes between the western league and the Canadian Amateur Hockey Association (CAHA), the CAHA general meeting in May 1970 discussed proposals from the Butlin to disband the rival Canadian Hockey Association and rejoin CAHA. Proposals included splitting junior hockey into two tiers and readmitting the WCHL into the top tier along with the Quebec Major Junior Hockey League and the Ontario Hockey Association Major Junior A Series. The top tier teams would be eligible to compete for the Memorial Cup, receive greater development payments from the National Hockey League when their players were drafted, and be allowed to select a limited number of players from lower-tier teams.

On May 29, 1970, Justice Lieberman of the Alberta Supreme Court ruled in favour of the WCHL being paid C$13,200 in outstanding development payments from the CAHA for the 1968 NHL draft. Butlin was satisfied with the ruling and considered further court action to receive an additional $40,700 from the 1969 NHL draft.

On June 24, 1970, the WCHL and CAHA signed a two-year agreement to reunite the organizations. The WCHL was admitted to the top tier of major junior hockey, receiving $100,000 in development grants for the 1970–71 season. The WCHL would pay a flat registration fee per team rather than a percentage of gate receipts, and would have direct representation on the CAHA junior council. The WCHL was expected to abide by any future CAHA-NHL agreements, which included the re-negotiation of draft payment amounts, and CAHA agreed to distribute outstanding draft money. League expansion or relocation of teams were subject to CAHA approval, and the WCHL league champion would qualify for the Memorial Cup final. The WCHL was allowed four over-age players for the 1970–71 season, and then two over-age players from the following season onward. The WCHL was allowed to transfer up to six players between provinces per team from areas west of Ontario, and could draft a maximum of two players from a lower tier team.

In August 1970, Butlin announced an affiliation agreement with the British Columbia Junior Hockey League to develop prospect players for the WCHL.

In October 1970, CAHA president Earl Dawson threatened to have the league expelled from CAHA due to the use of over-age players who came from Ontario, and disputes over payments to lower tier teams. CAHA secretary Gordon Juckes later clarified that automatic release provisions would not be used in the 1970–71 season, and suggested alternate arrangements be made to settle disputes of roster movements between tiers.

In January 1971, the league set up an $8,000 scholarship for Ernie Heineman due to a career-ending eye injury.

Butlin resigned as WCHL president on June 21, 1971, stating he was not happy with how some team owners conducted business. For example, he stated that several team owners had conducted negotiations with potential new teams from British Columbia without him.

== Regular season ==
=== Final standings ===
East Division
Pos	Team	Pld	W	L	T	GF	GA	Pts
1	x – Estevan Bruins	66	41	20	5	283	201	87
2	x – Flin Flon Bombers	66	41	23	2	306	224	84
3	x – Winnipeg Jets	66	31	32	3	278	269	65
4	x – Regina Pats	66	28	36	2	202	246	58
5	Brandon Wheat Kings	66	20	46	0	247	387	40

x – qualified for playoffs

West Division
Pos	Team	Pld	W	L	T	GF	GA	Pts
1	x – Edmonton Oil Kings	66	45	20	1	346	258	91
2	x – Calgary Centennials	66	37	22	7	244	175	81
3	x – Saskatoon Blades	66	29	36	1	295	299	59
4	x – Swift Current Broncos	66	24	40	2	229	290	50
5	Medicine Hat Tigers	66	22	43	1	271	352	45

x – qualified for playoffs

=== Scoring leaders ===
Note: GP = Games played; G = Goals; A = Assists; Pts = Points; PIM = Penalties in minutes

Player	Team	GP	G	A	Pts	PIM
Chuck Arnason	Flin Flon Bombers	66	79	84	163	152
Orest Kindrachuk	Saskatoon Blades	61	49	100	149	103
Lorne Henning	Estevan Bruins	66	64	66	130	41
Laurie Yaworski (Note: Laurie Yaworski, while finishing as one of the top-10 WCHL scoring leaders in both the 1969–70 and 1970–71 WCHL seasons, was not drafted in either the 1969 nor 1970 NHL Amateur Drafts, and played less than one full season of professional ice hockey, appearing in 59 games in the 1972–73 season, split across three different minor leagues: the AHL's Richmond Robins (7 games); the WHL's San Diego Gulls (28 games); and the IHL's Dayton Gems and Flint Generals (24 games, Dayton-Flint split unknown).)	Saskatoon Blades	57	73	54	127	104
Wayne Chernecki	Winnipeg Jets	65	50	73	123	56
Dan Spring	Edmonton Oil Kings	65	43	79	122	44
Don Kozak	Edmonton Oil Kings	66	60	61	121	122
Stan Weir	Medicine Hat Tigers	66	52	59	111	88
Gene Carr	Flin Flon Bombers	62	36	68	104	105
Brian Carlin	Medicine Hat Tigers	65	44	56	100	46

== 1971 WCHL playoffs ==
=== Quarterfinals ===
- Winnipeg defeated Estevan 4 games to 2 with 1 tie
- Flin Flon defeated Regina 4 games to 1 with 1 tie
- Edmonton defeated Saskatoon 4 games to 1
- Calgary defeated Swift Current 3 games to 0 with 2 ties

=== Semifinals ===
- Flin Flon defeated Winnipeg 5 games to 2
- Edmonton defeated Calgary 4 games to 2

=== Finals ===
- Edmonton defeated Flin Flon 4 games to 1 with 1 tie

== All-Star game ==
The 1970–71 WCHL All-Star Game was held in Winnipeg, Manitoba, with the WCHL All-stars defeating the Winnipeg Jets 4–3 before a crowd of 3,543.

== Awards ==
Most Valuable Player: Ed Dyck, Calgary Centennials
Top Scorer: Chuck Arnason, Flin Flon Bombers
Most Sportsmanlike Player: Lorne Henning, Estevan Bruins
Defenseman of the Year: Ron Jones, Edmonton Oil Kings
Rookie of the Year: Stan Weir, Medicine Hat Tigers
Goaltender of the Year: Ed Dyck, Calgary Centennials
Coach of the Year: Pat Ginnell, Flin Flon Bombers
Regular Season Champions: Edmonton Oil Kings

== All-star team ==
- Goaltender: Ed Dyck, Calgary Centennials
- Defenceman: Ron Jones, Edmonton Oil Kings
- Defenceman: Len Frig, Calgary Centennials & Ed Sidebottom, (Note: Ed Sidebottom, while drafted in the 4th round of the 1971 NHL Amateur Draft, and again in the 66th round of the 1972 WHA General Player Draft, played three partial seasons of professional ice hockey, split across five different teams in three different minor leagues in the 1971–72 to 1973–74 seasons: the IHL's Muskegon Mohawks and Des Moines Oak Leafs (totaling 88 games over three seasons); the EHL's New Haven Blades and Charlotte Checkers (totaling 16 games in one season); and the CHL's Omaha Knights (16 games in one season).) Estevan Bruins (tied)
- Centerman: Gene Carr, Flin Flon Bombers
- Left winger: Rod Norrish, Regina Pats
- Right winger: Chuck Arnason, Flin Flon Bombers

== See also ==
- 1970 in sports
- 1971 in sports

== Trivia ==
Preceded by 1969–70 WCHL season	WHL seasons	Succeeded by 1971–72 WCHL season
