= Ron Smith (ice hockey, born 1952) =

Canadian ice hockey player and politician

- Born: November 19, 1952 (age 73) Port Hope, Ontario, Canada
- Height: 6 ft 0 in (183 cm)
- Weight: 185 lb (84 kg; 13 st 3 lb)
- Position: Defence
- Shot: Right
- Played for: New York Islanders
- NHL draft: 49th overall, 1972; New York Islanders
- Playing career: 1969–1977

Ronald Robert Smith (born November 19, 1952) is a Canadian former ice hockey defenceman as well as a politician. He played 11 games in the National Hockey League for New York Islanders during the 1972–73 season. After his playing career, he was elected Mayor of the Municipality of Port Hope, Ontario from 1994 to 2000.

== Biography ==
=== Playing career ===
During the 1968-69 season, Smith played for the Cobourg Cougars of the Eastern Ontario O.H.A. Junior B League. From 1969 to 1970, Smith played for the St. Catharines Black Hawks of the Canadian Hockey League (Ontario Hockey Association). He was traded to the Sorel Black Hawks of the CHL (Quebec Major Junior A League) during the 1970-71 season. Smith was subsequently traded again before the 1971-72 season to the Cornwall Royals of the Quebec League. This trade was most fortunate for Smith and his teammates as the "Royals" won the 1972 Memorial Cup National Championship. Smith's initial professional career was commenced by splitting the 1972-73 season between playing with the New York Islanders of the National Hockey League and the New Haven Nighthawks of the American Hockey League.

Smith was selected by the New York Islanders as the first player in the 4th round of the 1972 NHL Amateur Draft of players (#49 overall). He played 11 NHL games for the Islanders. Later, Smith played for the Fort Worth Wings, the Fort Worth Texans of the Central Hockey League, Bodens BK in Sweden, and the Erie Blades of the North American Hockey League. He retired from play in 1977.

=== Post-playing career ===
Smith was elected and became the Mayor of the Municipality of Port Hope, Ontario, from 1994 to 2000.

== Career statistics ==
=== Regular season and playoffs ===
			Regular season					Playoffs
Season	Team	League	GP	G	A	Pts	PIM	GP	G	A	Pts	PIM
1969–70	St. Catharines Black Hawks	OHA	15	0	0	0	24	—	—	—	—	—
1970–71	Sorel Eperviers	QMJHL	42	4	12	16	152	6	0	2	2	2
1971–72	Cornwall Royals	QMJHL	56	8	27	35	250	13	4	3	7	24
1971–72	Cornwall Royals	M-Cup	—	—	—	—	—	3	0	0	0	16
1972–73	New York Islanders	NHL	11	1	1	2	14	—	—	—	—	—
1972–73	New Haven Nighthawks	AHL	53	6	11	17	83	—	—	—	—	—
1973–74	Fort Worth Wings	CHL	72	1	16	17	103	5	1	1	2	2
1974–75	Fort Worth Texans	CHL	75	6	19	25	97	—	—	—	—	—
1975–76	Bodens BK	SWE-2	22	6	7	13	69	—	—	—	—	—
1976–77	Erie Blades	NAHL	8	0	2	2	0	—	—	—	—	—
NHL totals			11	1	1	2	14	—	—	—	—	—
