= Ed Dyck =

Canadian ice hockey player

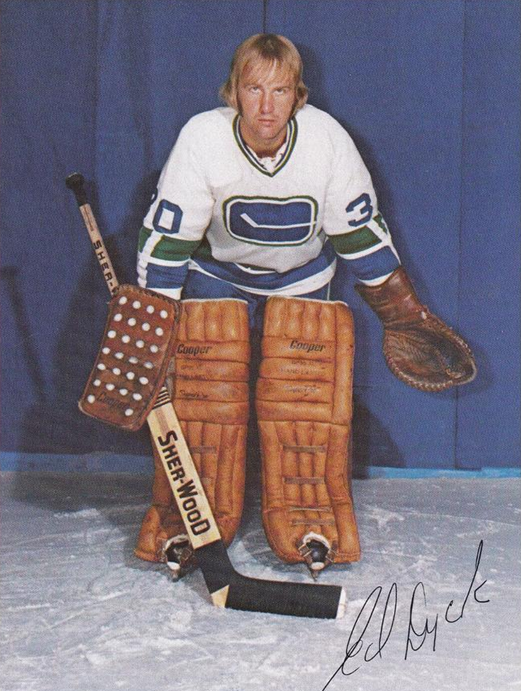
- Dyck in 1972 photo
- Born: October 29, 1950 Warman, Saskatchewan, Canada
- Died: January 18, 2017 (aged 66) Red Deer, Alberta, Canada
- Height: 5 ft 11 in (180 cm)
- Weight: 160 lb (73 kg; 11 st 6 lb)
- Position: Goaltender
- Caught: Left
- Played for: Vancouver Canucks
- NHL draft: 30th overall, 1970; Vancouver Canucks
- Playing career: 1971–1975

Edwin Paul "Ed" Dyck (October 29, 1950 – January 18, 2017) was a Canadian ice hockey goaltender. He played 62 games for the Vancouver Canucks of the National Hockey League from 1972 until 1974. Dyck also played three seasons with the Seattle Totems of the senior Western Hockey League and one season with the Indianapolis Racers of the World Hockey Association. He ended his career playing the season 1975–1976 in the Swedish Division 1 (2nd tier) team Bodens BK. Dyck died of cancer in 2017.

== Career statistics ==
=== Regular season and playoffs ===
			Regular season									Playoffs
Season	Team	League	GP	W	L	T	MIN	GA	SO	GAA	SV%	GP	W	L	MIN	GA	SO	GAA	SV%
1966–67	Swift Current Broncos	Exhib.	1	—	—	—	—	—	—	—	—	—	—	—	—	—	—	—	—
1967–68	Estevan Bruins	WCHL	4	—	—	—	240	12	0	3.00	—	2	2	0	0	120	5	0	2.50
1968–69	Calgary Centennials	WCHL	36	—	—	—	2111	120	1	3.41	—	—	—	—	—	—	—	—	—
1969–70	Calgary Centennials	WCHL	60	—	—	—	3599	193	3	3.22	—	16	7	7	2	960	45	1	2.81
1970–71	Calgary Centennials	WCHL	66	—	—	—	4069	172	4	2.53	.917	11	5	4	2	641	29	0	2.71
1971–72	Vancouver Canucks	NHL	12	1	6	2	572	35	0	3.67	.883	—	—	—	—	—	—	—	—
1971–72	Rochester Americans	AHL	10	4	3	2	554	43	1	4.66	—	—	—	—	—	—	—	—	—
1971–72	Seattle Totems	WHL	6	1	5	0	360	31	0	5.17	—	—	—	—	—	—	—	—	—
1972–73	Vancouver Canucks	NHL	25	5	17	1	1295	98	1	4.54	.854	—	—	—	—	—	—	—	—
1972–73	Seattle Totems	WHL	13	3	6	3	617	50	0	4.86	—	—	—	—	—	—	—	—	—
1973–74	Vancouver Canucks	NHL	12	2	5	2	582	45	0	4.64	.845	—	—	—	—	—	—	—	—
1973–74	Seattle Totems	WHL	4	2	1	1	173	10	1	3.47	—	—	—	—	—	—	—	—	—
1974–75	Indianapolis Racers	WHA	32	3	21	3	1692	123	0	4.36	.861	—	—	—	—	—	—	—	—
1975–76	Bodens BK	SWE.2	—	—	—	—	—	—	—	—	—	—	—	—	—	—	—	—	—
NHL totals			49	8	28	5	2449	178	1	4.36	.859	—	—	—	—	—	—	—	—
WHA totals			32	3	21	3	1692	123	0	4.36	.861	—	—	—	—	—	—	—	—

== Awards ==
- WCHL All-Star Team – 1971
