= Gene Carr (ice hockey) =

Canadian ice hockey player (1951–2023)

- Born: September 17, 1951 Nanaimo, British Columbia, Canada
- Died: December 13, 2023 (aged 72) Los Angeles, California, US
- Height: 5 ft 11 in (180 cm)
- Weight: 185 lb (84 kg; 13 st 3 lb)
- Position: Centre
- Shot: Left
- Played for: St. Louis Blues; New York Rangers; Los Angeles Kings; Pittsburgh Penguins; Atlanta Flames
- NHL draft: 4th overall, 1971; St. Louis Blues
- Playing career: 1971–1979

Eugene William Carr (September 17, 1951 – December 13, 2023) was a Canadian professional ice hockey forward who played 465 games in the National Hockey League (NHL). He played for the St. Louis Blues, New York Rangers, Los Angeles Kings, Pittsburgh Penguins and Atlanta Flames.

He played in all 16 games in the New York Rangers playoff run in 1972 which ended with a finals loss to the Stanley Cup Champions, Boston Bruins.

Carr's father, Red Carr, also played in the NHL. Gene Carr died in Los Angeles from complication of back surgery on December 13, 2023, at the age of 72.

== Career statistics ==
=== Regular season and playoffs ===
			Regular season					Playoffs
Season	Team	League	GP	G	A	Pts	PIM	GP	G	A	Pts	PIM
1967–68	Kelowna Buckaroos	BCHL	—	—	—	—	—	—	—	—	—	—
1968-69	Kelowna Buckaroos	BCHL	—	32	22	54	89	—	—	—	—	—
1969–70	Flin Flon Bombers	WCHL	60	22	51	73	118	6	6	5	11	4
1970–71	Flin Flon Bombers	WCHL	62	36	68	104	150	17	12	18	30	42
1971–72	St. Louis Blues	NHL	15	3	2	5	9	—	—	—	—	—
1971–72	New York Rangers	NHL	59	8	8	16	25	16	1	3	4	21
1972–73	New York Rangers	NHL	50	9	10	19	50	1	0	1	1	0
1973–74	New York Rangers	NHL	29	1	5	6	15	—	—	—	—	—
1973–74	Providence Reds	AHL	10	4	10	14	18	—	—	—	—	—
1973–74	Los Angeles Kings	NHL	21	6	11	17	36	5	2	1	3	14
1974–75	Los Angeles Kings	NHL	80	7	32	39	103	3	1	2	3	29
1975–76	Los Angeles Kings	NHL	38	8	11	19	16	—	—	—	—	—
1976–77	Los Angeles Kings	NHL	68	15	12	27	25	9	1	1	2	2
1977–78	Los Angeles Kings	NHL	5	2	0	2	4	—	—	—	—	—
1977–78	Pittsburgh Penguins	NHL	70	17	37	54	76	—	—	—	—	—
1978–79	Atlanta Flames	NHL	30	3	8	11	6	1	0	0	0	0
1978–79	Tulsa Oilers	CHL	22	4	8	12	35	—	—	—	—	—
NHL totals			465	79	136	215	365	35	5	8	13	66

== Awards ==
- WCHL All-Star Team – 1971

== Popular culture ==
There is speculation that Carr, a friend of Glenn Frey, was an inspiration for the Eagles' song New Kid in Town.

Awards and achievements
Preceded by Gary Edwards	St. Louis Blues first-round draft pick 1971	Succeeded by Wayne Merrick
