= Randy Rota =

Canadian ice hockey player

- Born: August 16, 1950 (age 75) Creston, British Columbia, Canada
- Height: 5 ft 8 in (173 cm)
- Weight: 170 lb (77 kg; 12 st 2 lb)
- Position: Centre/Left Wing
- Shot: Left
- Played for: Montreal Canadiens; Los Angeles Kings; Kansas City Scouts; Colorado Rockies; Edmonton Oilers
- NHL draft: 33rd overall, 1970; California Golden Seals
- Playing career: 1970–1978

Randolph Frank Rota (born August 16, 1950) is a Canadian former professional ice hockey center and winger who played 212 games in the National Hockey League and 90 games in the World Hockey Association. He played for the Montreal Canadiens, Los Angeles Kings, Kansas City Scouts, Colorado Rockies, and Edmonton Oilers. Rota was born in Creston, British Columbia, and raised in Kamloops.

== Career statistics ==
			Regular season					Playoffs
Season	Team	League	GP	G	A	Pts	PIM	GP	G	A	Pts	PIM
1967–68	Kamloops Rockets	BCJHL	40	45	28	73	22	—	—	—	—	—
1968–69	Calgary Centennials	WCHL	33	20	18	38	2	11	0	3	3	—
1969–70	Calgary Centennials	WCHL	60	43	47	90	43	15	3	8	11	12
1970–71	Providence Reds	AHL	68	31	34	65	31	10	4	3	7	4
1971–72	Nova Scotia Voyageurs	AHL	72	32	23	55	24	15	6	4	10	2
1972–73	Montreal Canadiens	NHL	2	1	1	2	0	—	—	—	—	—
1972–73	Nova Scotia Voyageurs	AHL	73	34	38	72	23	13	10	7	17	10
1973–74	Los Angeles Kings	NHL	58	10	6	16	16	5	0	1	1	0
1974–75	Kansas City Scouts	NHL	80	15	18	33	30	—	—	—	—	—
1975–76	Kansas City Scouts	NHL	71	12	14	26	14	—	—	—	—	—
1976–77	Colorado Rockies	NHL	1	0	0	0	0	—	—	—	—	—
1976–77	Oklahoma City Blazers	CHL	12	4	4	8	5	—	—	—	—	—
1976–77	Edmonton Oilers	WHA	40	9	6	15	8	5	3	2	5	0
1977–78	Edmonton Oilers	WHA	53	8	22	30	12	5	1	1	2	4
WHA totals			93	17	28	45	20	10	4	3	7	4
NHL totals			212	38	39	77	60	5	0	1	1	0
