= Ron Lalonde =

Canadian ice hockey player (born 1952)

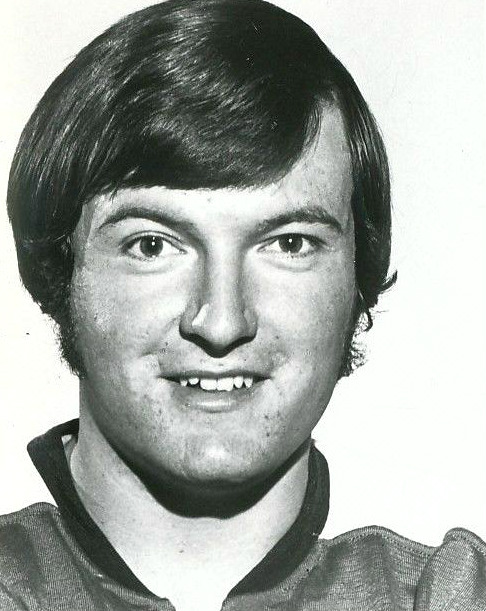
- Lalond in 1974
- Born: October 30, 1952 (age 73) Toronto, Ontario, Canada
- Height: 5 ft 10 in (178 cm)
- Weight: 170 lb (77 kg; 12 st 2 lb)
- Position: Centre
- Shot: Left
- Played for: Pittsburgh Penguins; Washington Capitals; HC Salzburg
- NHL draft: 56th overall, 1972; Pittsburgh Penguins
- Playing career: 1972–1981

Ronald Leo Lalonde (born October 30, 1952) is a Canadian former professional ice hockey player. He played in the National Hockey League with the Pittsburgh Penguins and Washington Capitals between 1972 and 1979.

== Playing career ==
Lalonde was born in Toronto, Ontario. As a youth, he played in the 1965 Quebec International Pee-Wee Hockey Tournament with the Scarboro Lions minor ice hockey team. He played junior in the Ontario Hockey League before turning professional with the Hershey Bears in 1972–73. He played nine games with the Pittsburgh Penguins that season and made the Penguins' roster the following season. He was traded to the Washington Capitals in December 1974, and would play the rest of his career through the 1979–80 season in the Capitals organization. Lalonde played 397 games in the NHL, scoring 45 goals and 78 assists for 123 points. During his time with the Capitals, he became the first player in franchise history to record a hat trick on March 30, 1975 against the Detroit Red Wings.

== Career statistics ==
=== Regular season and playoffs ===
			Regular season					Playoffs
Season	Team	League	GP	G	A	Pts	PIM	GP	G	A	Pts	PIM
1969–70	North York Rangers	MetJBHL	—	—	—	—	—	—	—	—	—	—
1970–71	Peterborough Petes	OHA	44	21	25	46	13	—	—	—	—	—
1971–72	Peterborough Petes	OHA	58	26	37	63	36	—	—	—	—	—
1971–72	Peterborough Petes	M-Cup	—	—	—	—	—	3	3	0	3	2
1972–73	Pittsburgh Penguins	NHL	9	0	0	0	2	—	—	—	—	—
1972–73	Hershey Bears	AHL	60	16	26	42	34	7	1	1	2	0
1973–74	Pittsburgh Penguins	NHL	73	10	17	27	14	—	—	—	—	—
1974–75	Pittsburgh Penguins	NHL	24	0	3	3	0	—	—	—	—	—
1974–75	Washington Capitals	NHL	50	12	14	26	27	—	—	—	—	—
1975–76	Washington Capitals	NHL	80	9	19	28	19	—	—	—	—	—
1976–77	Washington Capitals	NHL	76	12	17	29	24	—	—	—	—	—
1977–78	Washington Capitals	NHL	67	1	5	6	16	—	—	—	—	—
1978–79	Washington Capitals	NHL	18	1	3	4	4	—	—	—	—	—
1978–79	Hershey Bears	AHL	27	6	6	12	0	4	1	0	1	2
1978–79	Binghamton Dusters	AHL	26	7	7	14	0	—	—	—	—	—
1979–80	Hershey Bears	AHL	65	13	17	30	22	16	2	3	5	6
1980–81	HC Salzburg	AUT	28	9	11	20	38	—	—	—	—	—
NHL totals			397	45	78	123	106	—	—	—	—	—
