= Alexandre Giroux =

Canadian ice hockey forward (born 1981)

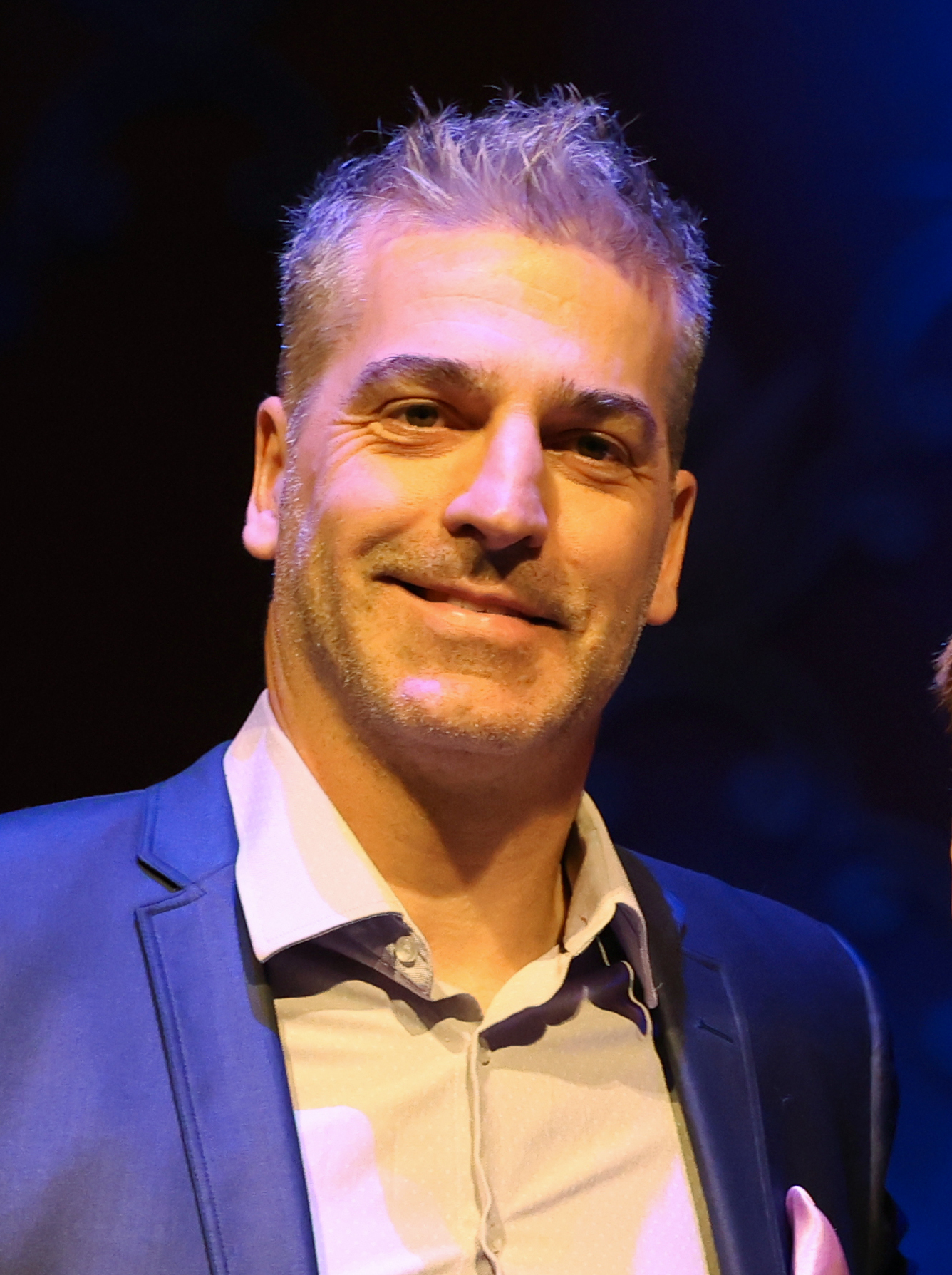
- Giroux at his 2026 AHL Hall of Fame induction ceremony
- Born: June 16, 1981 (age 45) Quebec City, Quebec, Canada
- Height: 6 ft 3 in (191 cm)
- Weight: 208 lb (94 kg; 14 st 12 lb)
- Position: Centre/Left wing
- Shoots: Left
- LNAH team Former teams: Thetford Assurancia; New York Rangers; Washington Capitals; Edmonton Oilers; Columbus Blue Jackets; Dinamo Riga; Kloten Flyers; HC Ambrì-Piotta; Medvescak Zagreb; Brûleurs de Loups
- NHL draft: 213th overall, 1999; Ottawa Senators
- Playing career: 2001–present

Medal record

Ice hockey

Representing Canada

Spengler Cup
Gold medal – first place	2015 Davos	

Alexandre Giroux (born June 16, 1981) is a Canadian ice hockey forward. He last played for the Thetford Assurancia of the Quebec-based Ligue Nord-Américaine de Hockey. He previously played in the National League (NL) with HC Ambrì-Piotta and EHC Kloten. He is the son of former World Hockey Association player Réjean Giroux.

== Playing career ==
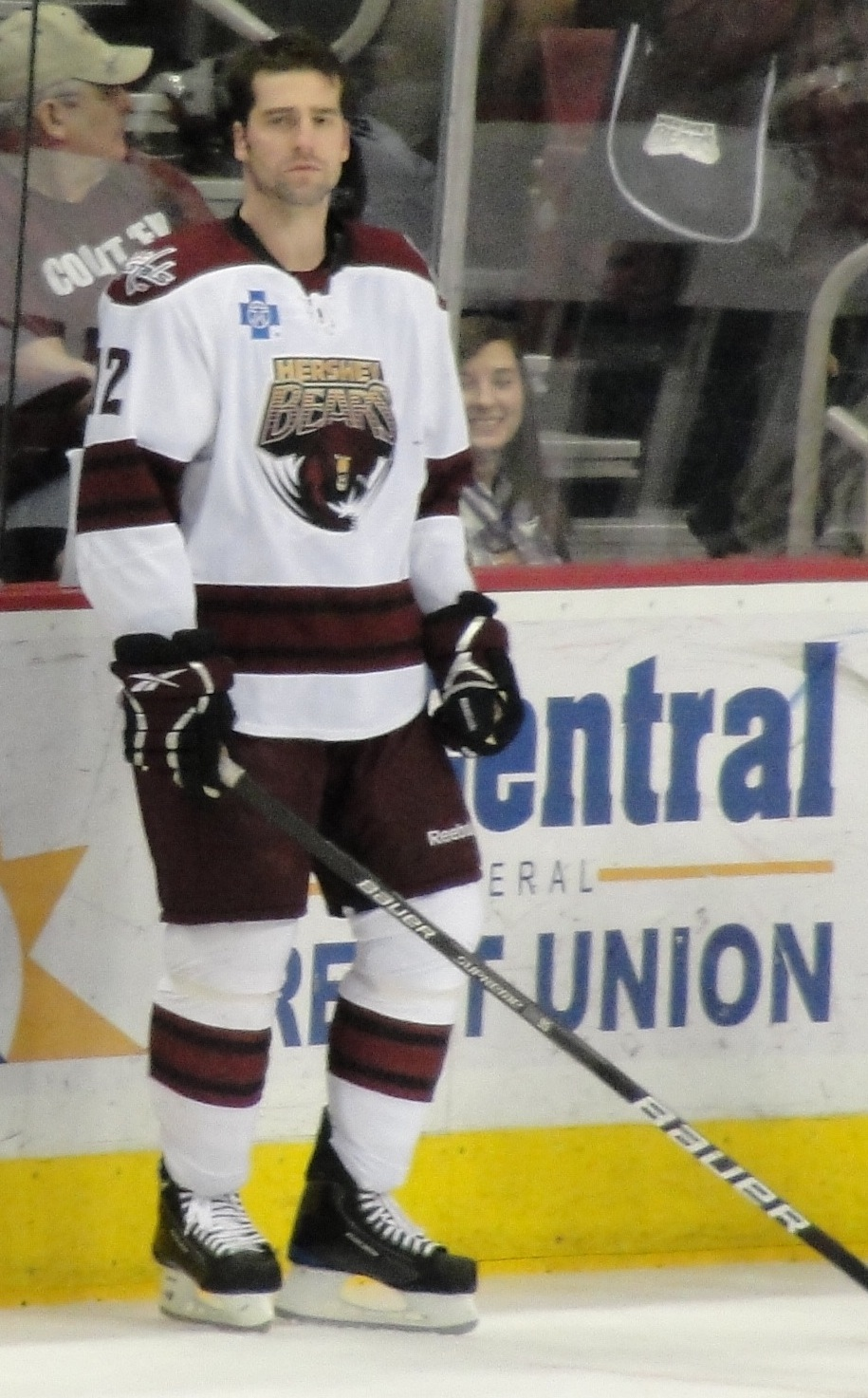
Giroux in a Hershey Bears uniform in 2010

=== Amateur ===
As a youth, Giroux played in the 1995 Quebec International Pee-Wee Hockey Tournament with a minor ice hockey team from Quebec City.

Giroux joined the QMJHL's Hull Olympiques in 1998–99 and went on to play parts of three seasons with the club before joining the Rouyn-Noranda Huskies midway through the 2000–01 season. Over the course of his junior career, Giroux registered 226 points (111 goals and 115 assists) before going on to make his professional debut with the AHL's Grand Rapids Griffins in 2001–02.

=== Professional ===
Drafted by the Ottawa Senators in 1999, Giroux failed to crack the NHL roster. He would spend parts of three seasons in the Senators' system before a 2004 deadline deal sent him and Karel Rachunek to the New York Rangers for Greg de Vries. Giroux would ultimately play only one game with the Rangers, spending the majority of his time with their farm team, the Hartford Wolf Pack. In the summer of 2006, Giroux signed as a free agent with the Washington Capitals. As a member of the Capitals, Giroux would spend the majority of his time with the club's AHL affiliate, the Hershey Bears and appear in a handful of games with Washington. The following summer, he signed as a free agent with the Atlanta Thrashers. With the Thrashers, Giroux was sent to the club's AHL affiliate, the Chicago Wolves. He tallied 19 goals and 41 points in 44 games with the Wolves before he was traded back to the Capitals organization.

On August 5, 2009, it was announced that Giroux had signed a one-year two-way contract to remain with the Hershey Bears. The 2008–09 AHL season was a successful one for Giroux. On January 18, 2009, Giroux broke Brett Hull's American Hockey League record for consecutive games scoring a goal, scoring in 15 straight games. On April 10, 2009, Giroux capped off his memorable season by being awarded the Les Cunningham Award as American Hockey League MVP.

On July 3, 2010, he signed a one-year deal with the Edmonton Oilers. Following their preseason run, he was assigned to the Oilers' AHL affiliates, the Oklahoma City Barons. With a season-ending injury to the Oilers' Taylor Hall, Giroux was recalled from Oklahoma City, on March 5, 2011. He made his Oilers debut the same night, scoring a goal which helped Edmonton secure a 5–1 victory, over the Colorado Avalanche.

On July 3, 2011, Giroux signed a two-way contract with the Columbus Blue Jackets. During the 2011–12 season, Giroux appeared in 9 games with the Blue Jackets but primarily was assigned to the all familiar AHL with the Springfield Falcons.

On May 24, 2012, Giroux left North America and inked a one-year deal as a free agent with Dinamo Riga of the Kontinental Hockey League. In the 2012–13 season with the Latvian outfit, Giroux failed to produce the desired offensive impact, with 21 points in 47 games, before he was loaned to Swiss club, the Kloten Flyers of the NLA to end the campaign.

In the following season, Giroux remained in Switzerland, signing an initial one-year contract with HC Ambrì-Piotta of the National League A (NLA) on June 28, 2013. During his three-year stint, he saw the ice in 167 NLA contests, tallying 77 goals and 56 assists.

Giroux returned to the KHL upon the conclusion of the 2015-16 season, penning a deal with Medvescak Zagreb in July 2016.

In 11 AHL seasons, Giroux totaled 704 points in 771 games. His 368 goals are seventh-most in league history.

== Career statistics ==
			Regular season					Playoffs
Season	Team	League	GP	G	A	Pts	PIM	GP	G	A	Pts	PIM
1997–98	Sainte–Foy Gouverneurs	QMAAA	42	28	30	58	96	—	—	—	—	—
1998–99	Hull Olympiques	QMJHL	67	15	22	37	124	22	2	2	4	8
1999–2000	Hull Olympiques	QMJHL	72	52	47	99	117	15	12	6	18	30
2000–01	Hull Olympiques	QMJHL	38	31	32	63	62	—	—	—	—	—
2000–01	Rouyn–Noranda Huskies	QMJHL	25	13	14	27	56	9	2	6	8	22
2001–02	Grand Rapids Griffins	AHL	70	11	16	27	34	—	—	—	—	—
2002–03	Binghamton Senators	AHL	67	19	16	35	101	10	1	0	1	10
2003–04	Binghamton Senators	AHL	59	19	23	42	79	—	—	—	—	—
2003–04	Hartford Wolf Pack	AHL	16	6	3	9	13	16	3	4	7	28
2004–05	Hartford Wolf Pack	AHL	78	32	22	54	128	6	3	3	6	23
2005–06	Hartford Wolf Pack	AHL	73	36	31	67	102	13	7	9	16	17
2005–06	New York Rangers	NHL	1	0	0	0	0	—	—	—	—	—
2006–07	Hershey Bears	AHL	67	42	28	70	82	19	4	7	11	27
2006–07	Washington Capitals	NHL	9	2	2	4	2	—	—	—	—	—
2007–08	Chicago Wolves	AHL	44	19	22	41	47	—	—	—	—	—
2007–08	Hershey Bears	AHL	24	14	13	27	30	5	3	1	4	2
2008–09	Hershey Bears	AHL	69	60	37	97	84	22	15	13	28	22
2008–09	Washington Capitals	NHL	12	1	1	2	10	—	—	—	—	—
2009–10	Hershey Bears	AHL	69	50	53	103	34	21	14	13	27	22
2009–10	Washington Capitals	NHL	9	1	2	3	4	—	—	—	—	—
2010–11	Oklahoma City Barons	AHL	70	32	46	78	63	6	2	1	3	2
2010–11	Edmonton Oilers	NHL	8	1	1	2	2	—	—	—	—	—
2011–12	Springfield Falcons	AHL	65	28	26	54	62	—	—	—	—	—
2011–12	Columbus Blue Jackets	NHL	9	1	0	1	8	—	—	—	—	—
2012–13	Dinamo Rīga	KHL	47	16	5	21	41	—	—	—	—	—
2012–13	Kloten Flyers	NLA	4	3	2	5	25	—	—	—	—	—
2013–14	HC Ambrì–Piotta	NLA	46	20	18	38	64	4	2	0	2	4
2014–15	HC Ambrì–Piotta	NLA	49	27	13	40	28	—	—	—	—	—
2015–16	HC Ambrì–Piotta	NLA	48	17	19	36	28	—	—	—	—	—
2016–17	KHL Medveščak Zagreb	KHL	58	18	5	23	82	—	—	—	—	—
2017–18	Brûleurs de Loups	FRA	44	25	33	58	28	16	4	4	8	43
2018–19	Thetford Assurancia	LNAH	27	21	15	36	18	10	5	8	13	4
2019–20	Thetford Assurancia	LNAH	17	9	8	17	14	—	—	—	—	—
AHL totals			771	368	334	704	837	118	52	51	103	153
NHL totals			48	6	6	12	18	—	—	—	—	—
NLA totals			147	67	52	119	145	4	2	0	2	4

== Awards and honours ==
- Les Cunningham Award (AHL MVP) (2008-09)
- AHL scoring champion (2008-09)
- AHL goal-scoring champion (2008-09, 2009-10)
- AHL First All-Star Team (2008-09, 2009-10, 2010–11)
- Calder Cup champion (2009, 2010)
- AHL All-Star Classic (2007, 2009, 2010, 2011)
- AHL Hall of Fame, Class of 2026
