= Lorne Henning =

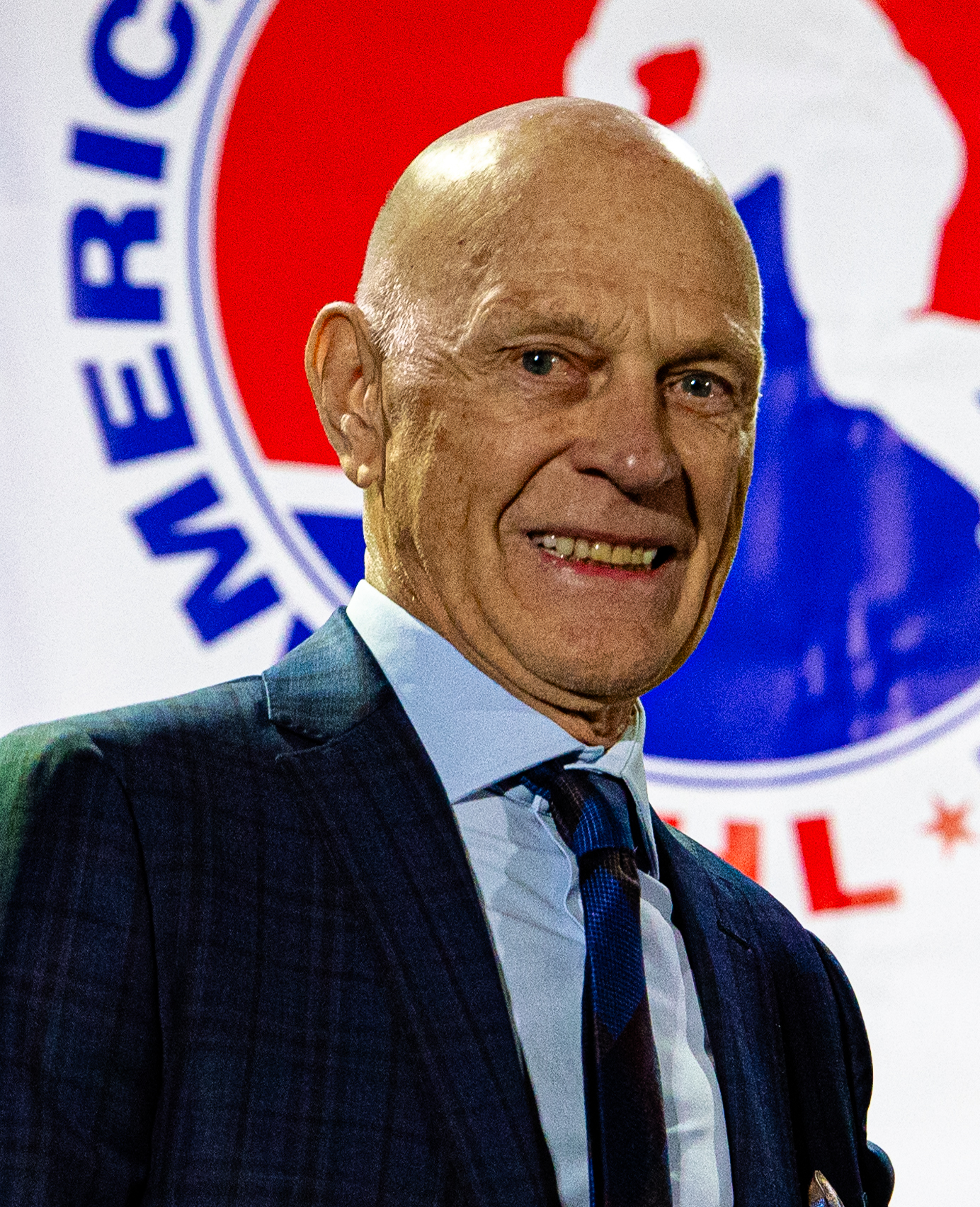
- Born: February 22, 1952 (age 74) Melfort, Saskatchewan, Canada
- Height: 5 ft 10 in (178 cm)
- Weight: 185 lb (84 kg; 13 st 3 lb)
- Position: Centre
- Shot: Left
- Played for: New York Islanders
- Coached for: Minnesota North Stars; New York Islanders
- NHL draft: 17th overall, 1972; New York Islanders
- Playing career: 1972–1981
- Coaching career: 1985–2001

Lorne Henning (born February 22, 1952) is a Canadian professional ice hockey executive and former player. He most recently has served as a scout for the Seattle Kraken of the National Hockey League (NHL).

== Career ==
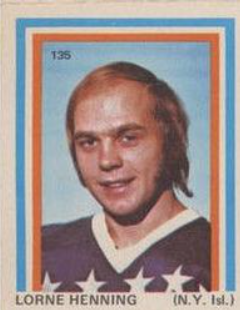
Henning in 1972-73 stamp for New York Islanders

Born in Melfort, Saskatchewan, Henning spent nine years as a forward with the New York Islanders, with whom he earned an assist on the May 24, 1980 goal by Bobby Nystrom that earned the Islanders their first of four consecutive Stanley Cups. In the summer of 1980, he became an assistant coach with the Islanders. He also played nine regular season games, and one playoff game, becoming the last player-coach for a Stanley Cup-winning team. Henning retired for good as a player after the 1980–81 season but retained his assistant coaching position. He left the Islanders to become the head coach of the Minnesota North Stars in 1985. Henning was replaced during the 1986–87 season by Glen Sonmor. He later returned to Islanders as an assistant coach and in 1994–95 Henning replaced the retiring Al Arbour as coach. He was fired in the offseason and replaced by Mike Milbury. In 2001, he replaced Butch Goring as the Islanders coach on an interim basis. He later served as an assistant coach with Chicago Blackhawks, Mighty Ducks of Anaheim, and the Islanders. He was the assistant general manager for the Vancouver Canucks until 2015.

=== Career statistics ===
Regular season and playoffs

			Regular season					Playoffs
Season	Team	League	GP	G	A	Pts	PIM	GP	G	A	Pts	PIM
1968–69	Estevan Bruins	WCHL	60	27	27	54	20	10	3	3	6	0
1969–70	Estevan Bruins	WCHL	60	40	52	92	33	5	1	1	2	0
1970–71	Estevan Bruins	WCHL	66	64	66	130	41	7	5	10	15	7
1971–72	New Westminster Bruins	WCHL	60	51	63	114	29	5	3	1	4	7
1972–73	New York Islanders	NHL	63	7	19	28	14	—	—	—	—	—
1972–73	New Haven Nighthawks	AHL	4	0	2	2	2	—	—	—	—	—
1973–74	New York Islanders	NHL	60	12	15	27	6	—	—	—	—	—
1973–74	Fort Worth Wings	CHL	8	4	6	10	4	—	—	—	—	—
1974–75	New York Islanders	NHL	61	5	6	11	6	17	0	2	2	0
1975–76	New York Islanders	NHL	80	7	10	17	16	13	0	2	2	2
1976–77	New York Islanders	NHL	80	13	18	31	10	12	0	1	1	0
1977–78	New York Islanders	NHL	79	12	15	27	6	7	0	0	0	4
1978–79	New York Islanders	NHL	73	13	20	33	14	10	2	0	2	0
1979–80	New York Islanders	NHL	39	3	6	9	6	21	3	4	7	2
1980–81	New York Islanders	NHL	9	1	2	3	24	1	0	0	0	0
NHL totals			544	73	111	184	102	81	7	7	14	8

== Coaching record ==
Team	Year	Regular season							Postseason
Team	Year	G	W	L	T	OTL	Pts	Finish	Result
MIN	1985–86	80	38	33	9	-	85	2nd in Norris	Lost in First round
MIN	1986–87	78	30	39	9	-	69	5th in Norris	(fired)
NYI	1994–95	48	15	28	5	-	35	7th in Atlantic	Missed playoffs
NYI	2000–01	17	4	11	2	0	10	5th in Atlantic	Missed playoffs
Total		223	87	111	25	0			

== Awards ==
Stanley Cup Champion 1980 (player), 1981 (player/Ass't Coach), 1982, 1983 (Ass't Coach)

Preceded by Glen Sonmor	Head coach of the Minnesota North Stars; 1985–87	Succeeded by Glen Sonmor
Preceded by Al Arbour	Head coach of the New York Islanders; 1994–95	Succeeded by Mike Milbury
Preceded by Butch Goring	Head coach of the New York Islanders; 2001	Succeeded by Peter Laviolette
