= 1971–72 WCHL season =

Junior ice hockey season

- League: Western Hockey League
- Sport: Ice hockey
- Teams: 12

Regular season
- Season champions: Calgary Centennials (1)
- Season MVP: John Davidson (Calgary Centennials)
- Top scorer: Tom Lysiak (Medicine Hat Tigers)

Playoffs
- Finals champions: Edmonton Oil Kings (2)
- Runners-up: Regina Pats

WHL seasons
- 1970–71 1972–73

1971–72 Canadian major junior season
- Sport: Ice hockey
- Teams: 32

OHA

QMJHL

WCHL

Memorial Cup
- Finals champions: Cornwall Royals (QMJHL) (1st title)
- Runners-up: Peterborough Petes (OHA)

The 1971–72 WCHL season was the sixth season of the Western Canada Hockey League (WCHL). It featured twelve teams and a 68-game regular season. While the Calgary Centennials topped the season standings with 49 wins, the Edmonton Oil Kings won their second consecutive President's Cup, defeating the Regina Pats in the championship series.

This season also saw the league expand into British Columbia, becoming a truly Western Canadian organization. On the national scene, 1972 also marked the beginning of a new era as it was decided that the Memorial Cup would be contested through a round robin tournament featuring the champions from the country's three major junior leagues—the WCHL, the Quebec Major Junior Hockey League, and the Ontario Hockey Association. The Oil Kings became the WCHL's first participant under this new format at the 1972 Memorial Cup tournament.

== League notes ==
- The Estevan Bruins, one of the league's charter members, relocated to New Westminster and became the New Westminster Bruins. While the move left Estevan without major junior hockey, a new Estevan Bruins Junior A franchise was started in 1971, playing in the Saskatchewan Junior Hockey League.
- The Victoria Cougars and the Vancouver Nats joined the WCHL as expansion clubs, bringing the number of British Columbia-based teams up to three.
- With the B.C. teams joining the West Division, the Swift Current Broncos and Saskatoon Blades moved to the East division to create two divisions of six teams each.
- The season schedule expanded from 66 games to 68.

== Regular season ==
=== Final standings ===
East Division
Pos	Team	Pld	W	L	T	GF	GA	Pts
1	x – Regina Pats	68	43	23	2	287	225	88
2	x – Saskatoon Blades	68	37	28	3	312	258	77
3	x – Brandon Wheat Kings	68	35	33	0	338	331	70
4	x – Flin Flon Bombers	68	31	36	1	265	307	63
5	Swift Current Broncos	68	25	42	1	252	311	51
6	Winnipeg Jets	68	24	43	1	238	273	49

x – qualified for playoffs

West Division
Pos	Team	Pld	W	L	T	GF	GA	Pts
1	x – Calgary Centennials	68	49	16	3	296	169	101
2	x – Edmonton Oil Kings	68	44	22	2	320	246	90
3	x – New Westminster Bruins	68	40	27	1	285	240	81
4	x – Medicine Hat Tigers	68	35	30	3	351	312	73
5	Victoria Cougars	68	18	48	2	215	321	38
6	Vancouver Nats	68	17	50	1	213	379	35

x – qualified for playoffs

=== Scoring leaders ===
Note: GP = Games played; G = Goals; A = Assists; Pts = Points; PIM = Penalties in minutes

Player	Team	GP	G	A	Pts	PIM
Tom Lysiak	Medicine Hat Tigers	68	46	97	143	96
Stan Weir	Medicine Hat Tigers	68	58	75	133	77
Blaine Stoughton	Flin Flon Bombers	68	60	66	126	125
Robbie Neale	Brandon Wheat Kings	65	53	73	126	54
Dennis Sobchuk	Regina Pats	68	56	67	123	115
Jeff Ablett	Medicine Hat Tigers	68	59	57	116	99
Lorne Henning	New Westminster Bruins	60	51	63	114	29
Lanny McDonald	Medicine Hat Tigers	68	50	64	114	54
Ron Chipperfield	Brandon Wheat Kings	63	59	53	112	29
Glen Mikkelson	Brandon Wheat Kings	67	44	62	106	52

== 1972 WCHL Playoffs ==
=== Quarterfinals ===
- Brandon defeated Saskatoon 4 games to 3 with 1 tie
- Regina defeated Flin Flon 3 games to 2 with 2 ties
- Calgary defeated Medicine Hat 4 games to 2 with 1 tie
- Edmonton defeated New Westminster 4 games to 1

=== Semifinals ===
- Regina defeated Brandon 4 games to 2
- Edmonton defeated Calgary 4 games to 2

=== Finals ===
- Edmonton defeated Regina 4 games to 1

== All-Star game ==
The 1971–72 WCHL All-Star Game was held in Vancouver, British Columbia, with the East Division All-Stars defeating the West Division All-Stars 4–2 before a crowd of 5,783.

== Awards ==
Most Valuable Player: John Davidson, Calgary Centennials
Top Scorer: Tom Lysiak, Medicine Hat Tigers
Most Sportsmanlike Player: Ron Chipperfield, Brandon Wheat Kings
Defenseman of the Year: Jim Watson, Calgary Centennials
Rookie of the Year: Dennis Sobchuk, Regina Pats
Goaltender of the Year: John Davidson, Calgary Centennials
Coach of the Year: Earl Ingarfield, Sr., Regina Pats
Regular Season Champions: Calgary Centennials

== All-Star teams ==
	First Team		Second Team	
Goal	John Davidson	Calgary Centennials	Bernie Germain	Regina Pats
Defense	Jimmy Watson	Calgary Centennials	Tom Bladon	Edmonton Oil Kings
Defense	Phil Russell	Edmonton Oil Kings	Larry Sacharuk	Saskatoon Blades
Center	Tom Lysiak	Medicine Hat Tigers	Dennis Sobchuk	Regina Pats
Left Wing	Jeff Ablett	Medicine Hat Tigers	Darcy Rota	Edmonton Oil Kings
Right Wing	Blaine Stoughton	Flin Flon Bombers	Don Kozak	Edmonton Oil Kings

== See also ==
- 1972 Memorial Cup
- 1971 in sports
- 1972 in sports

Preceded by 1970–71 WCHL season	WHL seasons	Succeeded by 1972–73 WCHL season
