= Lethbridge Longhorns =

- City: Lethbridge, Alberta
- League: Alberta Junior Hockey League
- Founded: 1973

Franchise history
- 1963–1973: Lethbridge Sugar Kings
- 1973–1975: Lethbridge Longhorns

The Lethbridge Longhorns were a junior "A" ice hockey team in the Alberta Junior Hockey League (AJHL) based in Lethbridge, Alberta, Canada.

== History ==
The Lethbridge Longhorns were originally the Lethbridge Sugar Kings, one of the five original member hockey teams of the AJHL. The Sugar Kings folded following the 1972–73 season due to the forthcoming arrival of major junior hockey to Lethbridge. A new ownership group saved the team and renamed it the Longhorns in time for the 1973–74 season. The team only lasted two seasons however, folding after the 1974–75 season due to competition with major junior hockey. The Lethbridge Broncos of the Western Hockey League arrived from Swift Current in 1974.

== Season-by-season record ==
Note: GP = games played, W = wins, L = losses, OTL = overtime losses, Pts = points, GF = goals for, GA = goals against, PIM = penalties in minutes

Season	GP	W	L	OTL	Pts	GF	GA	PIM	Finish	Playoffs
1973–74	60	18	38	0	40	237	342
1974–75

== See also ==
- List of ice hockey teams in Alberta
