= Réjean Giroux =

Canadian ice hockey player

- Born: September 13, 1952 (age 73) Quebec City, Quebec, Canada
- Height: 5 ft 11 in (180 cm)
- Weight: 160 lb (73 kg; 11 st 6 lb)
- Position: Right wing
- Shot: Right
- Played for: WHA; Quebec Nordiques
- NHL draft: 77th overall, 1972; Chicago Black Hawks
- Playing career: 1972–1974

Réjean Giroux (born September 13, 1952) is a Canadian former professional ice hockey right winger who played for the Quebec Nordiques of the World Hockey Association. He is the father of NHL and KHL player Alexandre Giroux. As a youth, Giroux played in the 1964 Quebec International Pee-Wee Hockey Tournament with the Quebec Beavers minor ice hockey team.

== Career statistics ==
			Regular season					Playoffs
Season	Team	League	GP	G	A	Pts	PIM	GP	G	A	Pts	PIM
1969–70	Quebec Remparts	QMJHL	55	38	43	81	175	—	—	—	—	—
1970–71	Quebec Remparts	QMJHL	50	25	34	59	165	8	4	6	10	21
1971–72	Quebec Remparts	QMJHL	57	58	51	109	99	—	—	—	—	—
1972–73	Quebec Nordiques	WHA	59	10	12	22	41	—	—	—	—	—
1973–74	Maine Nordiques	NAHL	68	64	58	122	52	8	3	4	7	0
1973–74	Quebec Nordiques	WHA	12	5	6	11	14	—	—	—	—	—
1974–75	Dallas Black Hawks	CHL	68	27	33	60	54	10	0	7	7	13
1975–76	Dallas Black Hawks	CHL	50	15	18	33	19	—	—	—	—	—
1976–77	Beauce Jaros	NAHL	13	6	4	10	6	—	—	—	—	—
WHA totals			71	15	18	33	55	—	—	—	—	—
