= Dunc Wilson =

Canadian ice hockey player (1948–2023)

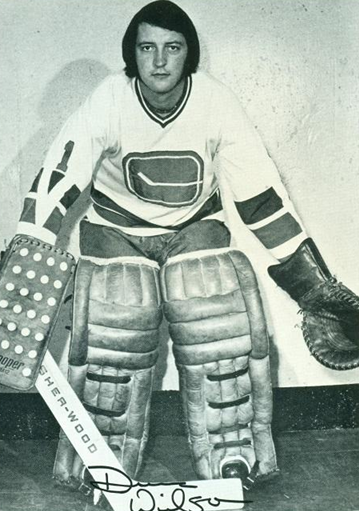
- Born: March 22, 1948 Toronto, Ontario, Canada
- Died: October 8, 2023 (aged 75) Utila, Honduras
- Height: 5 ft 11 in (180 cm)
- Weight: 175 lb (79 kg; 12 st 7 lb)
- Position: Goaltender
- Caught: Left
- Played for: Philadelphia Flyers; Vancouver Canucks; Toronto Maple Leafs; New York Rangers; Pittsburgh Penguins
- Playing career: 1968–1979

Duncan Shepherd Wilson (March 22, 1948 – October 8, 2023) was a Canadian professional ice hockey goaltender who spent ten seasons in the National Hockey League (NHL) between 1969 and 1979, with the Philadelphia Flyers, Vancouver Canucks, Toronto Maple Leafs, New York Rangers, and Pittsburgh Penguins. Wilson made his NHL debut with Philadelphia in 1970, and then spent three seasons with the expansion Canucks. Traded to Toronto in 1973, he played part of two seasons there before going to New York in 1975, and then to Pittsburgh for two seasons before finishing his NHL career with the Canucks in 1979.

== Playing career ==
Wilson was originally signed by the Boston Bruins and rose through their junior system, but was drafted away by the Philadelphia Flyers in 1968 just before turning professional. He spent two seasons with the Quebec Aces, Philadelphia's American Hockey League (AHL) affiliate, appearing in a single NHL game for the Flyers in the 1969–70 NHL season, on February 26, 1970 against the Chicago Black Hawks.

Wilson was claimed by the Vancouver Canucks in the 1970 NHL Expansion Draft. In Vancouver, he was one of three goaltenders carried by the team in their inaugural campaign. His first season was rocky, as he posted a dismal 3–25–2 record in 35 appearances. However, he was recognized as having significant potential, and at age 22 was viewed as the club's long-term starter over Charlie Hodge, the team's main goaltending option that year, who was 37.

When Hodge retired following a contract dispute, Wilson became Vancouver's starting goalie for 1971–72. He appeared in 53 games for the Canucks, posting a 16–30–3 record (his backups went 4–20–5) and a 3.61 GAA. In 1972–73, he had another solid year, finishing 13–21–5 with a 3.94 GAA.

In 1973, Vancouver acquired highly rated veteran Gary "Suitcase" Smith to be the team's starting goalie and Wilson was dealt to the Toronto Maple Leafs. He spent nearly two seasons in Toronto backing up Doug Favell before being waived, and he was claimed by the New York Rangers late in the 1974–75 season. He backed up John Davidson for the Rangers in 1975–76, but won just five games and being demoted briefly to the minors for the first time since 1970.

Dealt to the Pittsburgh Penguins for a draft pick, Wilson bounced back in 1976–77. As Pittsburgh's starting netminder, he appeared in 45 games and posted an 18–19–8 record and a sparkling 2.95 GAA along with five shutouts. In the process, he was named team MVP by both the franchise and their booster club. However, in 1977–78 he lost his starting job to Denis Herron, and posted a 5–11–3 record with a dismal 4.83 GAA.

Wilson started the 1978–79 season in the AHL after losing the backup job to rookie Greg Millen, and was sold back to the Canucks a month into the season. However, his performance was no better in Vancouver as he won just twice in 17 appearances, and he retired at the end of the season.

Following his retirement he sued the Canucks, alleging that they did not properly treat a mole which turned out to be skin cancer, and which later required extensive surgery to remove, helping to prematurely end his career. He lost his $400,000 lawsuit in front of the Supreme Court of British Columbia on November 18, 1983.

In 287 career NHL games, Wilson posted an 80–150–33 record along with eight shutouts and a 3.74 GAA.

== Death ==
Wilson died on October 8, 2023, in Utila, Honduras, where he had been living for several years.

== Career statistics ==
=== Regular season and playoffs ===
			Regular season									Playoffs
Season	Team	League	GP	W	L	T	MIN	GA	SO	GAA	SV%	GP	W	L	T	MIN	GA	SO	GAA	SV%
1964–65	Oshawa Generals	OHA	2	—	—	—	70	8	0	6.86	—	—	—	—	—	—	—	—	—	—
1965–66	Niagara Falls Flyers	OHA	22	—	—	—	137	82	1	3.59	—	4	1	2	1	240	17	0	4.25	—
1966–67	Niagara Falls Flyers	OHA	1	0	1	0	40	6	0	9.00	—	—	—	—	—	—	—	—	—	—
1966–67	Peterborough Petes	OHA	14	—	—	—	840	56	0	4.42	—	—	—	—	—	—	—	—	—	—
1967–68	Oshawa Generals	OHA	30	—	—	—	1800	159	1	5.30	—	—	—	—	—	—	—	—	—	—
1968–69	Quebec Aces	AHL	37	11	14	9	1814	98	0	3.24	—	15	7	8	0	835	38	0	2.73	—
1969–70	Philadelphia Flyers	NHL	1	0	1	0	60	3	0	3.02	.885	—	—	—	—	—	—	—	—	—
1969–70	Quebec Aces	AHL	57	—	—	—	3288	191	2	3.49	—	4	2	2	0	272	10	0	2.21	—
1970–71	Vancouver Canucks	NHL	35	3	25	2	1784	128	0	4.30	.881	—	—	—	—	—	—	—	—	—
1971–72	Vancouver Canucks	NHL	53	16	30	3	2864	173	1	3.62	.887	—	—	—	—	—	—	—	—	—
1972–73	Vancouver Canucks	NHL	43	13	21	5	2418	159	1	3.94	.880	—	—	—	—	—	—	—	—	—
1973–74	Toronto Maple Leafs	NHL	24	9	11	3	1403	68	1	2.91	.897	—	—	—	—	—	—	—	—	—
1974–75	Toronto Maple Leafs	NHL	25	8	11	4	1391	86	0	3.71	.880	—	—	—	—	—	—	—	—	—
1974–75	New York Rangers	NHL	3	1	2	0	179	13	0	4.35	.856	—	—	—	—	—	—	—	—	—
1975–76	New York Rangers	NHL	20	5	9	3	1076	76	0	4.24	.862	—	—	—	—	—	—	—	—	—
1975–76	Baltimore Clippers	AHL	6	3	2	0	325	15	1	2.77	—	—	—	—	—	—	—	—	—	—
1976–77	Pittsburgh Penguins	NHL	45	18	19	7	2622	129	5	2.95	.906	—	—	—	—	—	—	—	—	—
1977–78	Pittsburgh Penguins	NHL	21	5	11	3	1179	95	0	4.84	.842	—	—	—	—	—	—	—	—	—
1978–79	Vancouver Canucks	NHL	17	2	10	2	834	58	0	4.17	.876	—	—	—	—	—	—	—	—	—
1978–79	Dallas Black Hawks	CHL	3	2	1	0	180	11	0	3.67	.880	—	—	—	—	—	—	—	—	—
1978–79	Binghamton Dusters	AHL	3	0	2	0	109	11	0	6.03	.833	—	—	—	—	—	—	—	—	—
NHL totals			287	80	150	32	15811	988	8	3.75	.883	—	—	—	—	—	—	—	—	—
