= 1971–72 QMJHL season =

Canadian junior ice hockey season

The 1971–72 QMJHL season was the third season in the history of the Quebec Major Junior Hockey League. Ten teams played 62 games each in the schedule. The Cornwall Royals finished first place in the regular season, and won the President's Cup, defeating the Quebec Remparts in the finals. The Royals won the 1972 Memorial Cup, representing the QMJHL at the first Memorial Cup round-robin tournament.

== Team changes ==
- The Rosemont National relocate to Laval, Quebec, becoming the Laval National.

== Final standings ==
Note: GP = Games played; W = Wins; L = Losses; T = Ties; Pts = Points; GF = Goals for; GA = Goals against

Overall	GP	W	L	T	Pts	GF	GA
Cornwall Royals	62	47	13	2	96	361	182
Drummondville Rangers	62	42	18	2	86	304	239
Quebec Remparts	62	39	21	2	80	349	262
Sorel Éperviers	62	38	24	0	76	287	224
Shawinigan Bruins	61	34	24	3	71	290	208
Sherbrooke Castors	62	29	31	2	60	301	294
Trois-Rivières Ducs	62	27	31	4	58	249	252
Verdun Maple Leafs	61	20	40	1	41	252	366
Saint-Jérôme Alouettes	62	16	46	0	32	262	422
Laval National	62	9	53	0	18	224	430

- complete list of standings.

== Scoring leaders ==
Note: GP = Games played; G = Goals; A = Assists; Pts = Points; PIM = Penalties in minutes

Player	Team	GP	G	A	Pts	PIM
Jacques Richard	Quebec Remparts	61	71	89	160	100
Noel Desfosses	Sorel Éperviers	62	56	77	133	26
Dennis Desgagnes	Sorel Éperviers	62	38	93	131	52
Gerry Teeple	Cornwall Royals	56	57	71	128	24
Maurice Desfosses	Saint-Jérôme Alouettes	60	51	61	112	116
Claude St. Sauveur	Sherbrooke Castors	60	53	58	111	97
Denis Patry	Drummondville Rangers	62	55	56	111	100
Rejean Giroux	Quebec Remparts	57	58	51	109	99
John Martin	Shawinigan Bruins	61	52	57	109	50
Richard Grenier	Verdun Maple Leafs	61	46	56	102	83

- complete scoring statistics

== Playoffs ==
Jacques Richard was the leading scorer of the playoffs with 37 points (11 goals, 26 assists).

Quarterfinals

- Cornwall Royals defeated Verdun Maple Leafs 4 games to 0.
- Drummondville Rangers defeated Trois-Rivières Ducs 4 games to 1.
- Quebec Remparts defeated Sherbrooke Castors 4 games to 0.
- Shawinigan Bruins defeated Sorel Éperviers 4 games to 0.

Semifinals

- Cornwall Royals defeated Shawinigan Bruins 4 games to 1.
- Quebec Remparts defeated Drummondville Rangers 4 games to 0.

Finals

- Cornwall Royals defeated Quebec Remparts 4 games to 2, 1 tie.

== All-star teams ==
First team

- Goaltender - Richard Brodeur, Cornwall Royals
- Left defence - Guy Provost, Drummondville Rangers
- Right defence - Richard Campeau, Sorel Éperviers
- Left winger - Claude St. Sauveur, Sherbrooke Castors
- Centreman - Jacques Richard, Quebec Remparts
- Right winger - Rejean Giroux, Quebec Remparts
- Coach - Orval Tessier, Cornwall Royals

Second team

- Goaltender - Denis Herron, Trois-Rivières Ducs
- Left defence - Denis Deslauriers, Shawinigan Bruins
- Right defence - Jean Hamel, Drummondville Rangers
- Left winger - Noel Desfosses, Sorel Éperviers
- Centreman - Gerry Teeple, Cornwall Royals
- Right winger - Maurice Desfosses, St-Jérôme Alouettes
- Coach - Ghislain Delage, Sorel Éperviers
- List of First/Second/Rookie team all-stars.

== Trophies and awards ==
Team

- President's Cup - Playoff Champions, Cornwall Royals
- Jean Rougeau Trophy - Regular Season Champions, Cornwall Royals

Player

- Jean Béliveau Trophy - Top Scorer, Jacques Richard, Quebec Remparts
- Jacques Plante Memorial Trophy - Best GAA, Richard Brodeur, Cornwall Royals
- Michel Bergeron Trophy - Rookie of the Year, Bob Murray, Cornwall Royals
- Frank J. Selke Memorial Trophy - Most sportsmanlike player, Gerry Teeple, Cornwall Royals

== See also ==
- 1972 Memorial Cup
- 1972 NHL entry draft
- 1971–72 OHA season
- 1971–72 WCHL season

Preceded by 1970–71 QMJHL season	QMJHL seasons	Succeeded by 1972–73 QMJHL season
