= Rod Norrish =

Canadian ice hockey player

- Born: November 27, 1951 (age 73); Saskatoon, Saskatchewan, Canada
- Height: 5 ft 10 in (178 cm)
- Weight: 185 lb (84 kg; 13 st 3 lb)
- Position: Left wing
- Shot: Left
- Played for: Minnesota North Stars
- NHL draft: 21st overall, 1971; Minnesota North Stars
- Playing career: 1971–1975

Roderick Norrish (born November 27, 1951) is a Canadian former professional ice hockey player who played 21 games in the National Hockey League with the Minnesota North Stars during the 1973–74 and 1974–5 seasons. Norrish was born in Saskatoon, Saskatchewan.

== Career statistics ==
=== Regular season and playoffs ===
			Regular season					Playoffs
Season	Team	League	GP	G	A	Pts	PIM	GP	G	A	Pts	PIM
1968–69	Regina Pats	SJHL	—	—	—	—	—	—	—	—	—	—
1969–70	Regina Pats	SJHL	50	37	19	56	11	—	—	—	—	—
1969–70	Weyburn Red Wings	M-Cup	—	—	—	—	—	19	8	13	21	7
1970–71	Regina Pats	WCHL	65	49	32	81	49	—	—	—	—	—
1971–72	Cleveland Barons	AHL	39	0	1	1	0	6	0	0	0	0
1972–73	Cleveland/Jacksonville Barons	AHL	76	22	33	55	22	—	—	—	—	—
1973–74	New Haven Nighthawks	AHL	53	19	16	35	11	10	1	5	6	2
1973–74	Minnesota North Stars	NHL	9	2	1	3	0	—	—	—	—	—
1974–75	New Haven Nighthawks	AHL	52	9	21	30	13	16	6	8	14	0
1974–75	Minnesota North Stars	NHL	12	1	2	3	2	—	—	—	—	—
1976–77	Spokane Flyers	WIHL	—	—	—	—	—	—	—	—	—	—
AHL totals			220	50	71	121	46	32	7	13	20	2
NHL totals			21	3	3	6	2	—	—	—	—	—

== Awards ==
- WCHL All-Star Team – 1971
