= Don Kozak =

Canadian ice hockey player

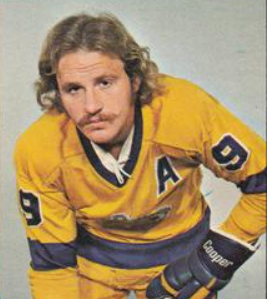
- Kozak in 1974 card
- Born: February 2, 1952 (age 74) Saskatoon, Saskatchewan, Canada
- Height: 5 ft 11 in (180 cm)
- Weight: 190 lb (86 kg; 13 st 8 lb)
- Position: Right wing
- Shot: Right
- Played for: Vancouver Canucks; Los Angeles Kings
- NHL draft: 20th overall, 1972; Los Angeles Kings
- Playing career: 1972–1982

Donald Kozak (born February 2, 1952) is a Canadian former professional ice hockey forward. During his career he played for the Los Angeles Kings and Vancouver Canucks of the National Hockey League (NHL), as well as several teams in the minor leagues. Kozak played junior for the Saskatoon Blades, Swift Current Broncos, and Edmonton Oil Kings before being selected by the Kings in the 1972 NHL Amateur Draft. He made his professional debut that year with Los Angeles, playing with the Kings until 1978. He would spend part of a season with the Canucks before finishing his career in the minor leagues, ending with a season in Germany before retiring in 1982. Kozak played a total of 437 games in the NHL.

== Playing career ==
On April 17, 1977, Kozak scored a record-breaking six-second goal against the Boston Bruins in the Stanley Cup quarterfinals, setting the Stanley Cup playoffs for fastest goal.

== Career statistics ==
=== Regular season and playoffs ===
			Regular season					Playoffs
Season	Team	League	GP	G	A	Pts	PIM	GP	G	A	Pts	PIM
1967–68	Saskatoon Blades	WCHL	35	9	5	14	10	7	0	1	1	8
1968–69	Saskatoon Blades	WCHL	26	5	6	11	43	4	0	0	0	0
1969–70	Swift Current Broncos	WCHL	56	40	34	74	67	5	1	3	4	4
1970–71	Edmonton Oil Kings	WCHL	66	60	61	121	122	17	9	16	25	49
1971–72	Edmonton Oil Kings	WCHL	68	55	50	105	183	16	7	7	14	18
1972–73	Los Angeles Kings	NHL	72	14	6	20	104	—	—	—	—	—
1973–74	Los Angeles Kings	NHL	76	21	14	35	54	5	0	0	0	33
1974–75	Los Angeles Kings	NHL	77	16	15	31	64	3	1	1	2	7
1975–76	Los Angeles Kings	NHL	62	20	24	44	94	9	1	0	1	12
1976–77	Los Angeles Kings	NHL	79	15	17	32	89	9	4	1	5	17
1977–78	Los Angeles Kings	NHL	43	8	5	13	45	—	—	—	—	—
1977–78	Springfield Indians	AHL	7	1	4	5	0	—	—	—	—	—
1978–79	Vancouver Canucks	NHL	28	2	5	7	30	3	1	0	1	0
1978–79	Tulsa Oilers	CHL	29	15	10	25	44	—	—	—	—	—
1978–79	Dallas Black Hawks	CHL	7	2	4	6	9	—	—	—	—	—
1979–80	Cincinnati Stingers	CHL	33	10	7	17	68	—	—	—	—	—
1980–81	Binghamton Whalers	AHL	41	5	10	15	37	—	—	—	—	—
1981–82	EHC Straubing	GER-2	21	19	11	30	16	—	—	—	—	—
NHL totals			437	96	86	182	480	29	7	2	9	69

== Awards ==
- WCHL Second All-Star Team – 1972
