= Lethbridge Sugar Kings =

- City: Lethbridge, Alberta
- League: Alberta Junior Hockey League
- Founded: 1963

Franchise history
- 1963–1973: Lethbridge Sugar Kings
- 1973–1975: Lethbridge Longhorns

The Lethbridge Sugar Kings were a founding junior "A" ice hockey team in the Alberta Junior Hockey League (AJHL) based in Lethbridge, Alberta, Canada.

== History ==
The Lethbridge Sugar Kings were one of the five original member hockey teams of the AJHL, which began play in 1963-64. The team folded following the 1972–73 season with the forthcoming arrival of major junior hockey to Lethbridge. The team was saved by a different ownership group and renamed the Lethbridge Longhorns for the 1973–74 season, but lasted only two seasons due to competition with major junior hockey. The Lethbridge Broncos of the Western Hockey League arrived from Swift Current in 1974.

== See also ==
- List of ice hockey teams in Alberta
