= Calgary Centennials =

Canadian ice hockey team (1966–1977)

- City: Calgary, Alberta
- League: Western Canada Hockey League
- Operated: 1966–1977
- Home arena: Stampede Corral
- Colours: Red & White

Franchise history
- 1966–67: Calgary Buffaloes
- 1967–77: Calgary Centennials
- 1977–82: Billings Bighorns
- 1982–83: Nanaimo Islanders
- 1983–88: New Westminster Bruins
- 1988-Present: Tri-City Americans

The Calgary Centennials were a junior ice hockey team that played in the Western Canada Hockey League (WCHL) from 1966–1977. They played in Calgary, Alberta, Canada at the Stampede Corral.

== History ==
A charter member of the Canadian Major Junior Hockey League in 1966, the franchise was known in its first season as the Calgary Buffaloes before becoming the Centennials (marking the Canadian Centennial that year) in the renamed WCHL for the 1967–68 season.

The franchise had a string of successful regular seasons in the early 1970s, winning three West division titles, however playoff success never followed. The Centennials only reached the WCHL finals once, falling in four straight to the Regina Pats in 1974.

Following the 1976–77 season, the Centennials were sold and relocated to Billings, Montana and became the Billings Bighorns. Calgarians would not have to wait long for another team, as the Winnipeg Monarchs were sold and relocated to Calgary to become the Calgary Wranglers for the 1978–78 season.

The Centennials franchise today is known as the Tri-City Americans, settling in Kennewick, Washington, after stops as the Billings Bighorns, Nanaimo Islanders, and New Westminster Bruins.

== Season-by-season record ==
Note: GP = Games played, W = Wins, L = Losses, T = Ties Pts = Points, GF = Goals for, GA = Goals against

Season	GP	W	L	T	GF	GA	Points	Finish	Playoffs
1966–67	56	4	47	5	178	426	13	7th Overall	Out of playoffs
1967–68	60	14	40	5	218	318	35	10th Overall	Out of playoffs
1968–69	60	31	28	1	253	236	63	2nd West	Lost semi-final
1969–70	60	37	22	1	249	197	75	1st West	Lost semi-final
1970–71	66	37	22	7	244	175	81	2nd West	Lost semi-final
1971–72	68	49	16	3	296	169	101	1st West	Lost semi-final
1972–73	68	35	22	11	302	224	81	3rd West	Lost quarter-final
1973–74	68	41	18	9	328	236	91	1st West	Lost final
1974–75	70	11	51	8	236	399	30	6th West	Out of playoffs
1975–76	72	22	45	5	284	381	49	6th West	Out of playoffs
1976–77	72	22	34	15	329	397	59	4th Central	Lost quarter-final

== NHL alumni ==
- Don Ashby
- Jeff Bandura
- Wayne Bianchin
- Brian Carlin
- Glen Cochrane
- John Davidson
- Ed Dyck
- Len Frig
- Danny Gare
- Rick Hodgson
- Jerry Holland
- Ron Homenuke
- Doug Horbul
- Kevin Krook
- Doug Lecuyer
- Craig Levie
- Bob Liddington
- Darryl Maggs
- Lanny McDonald
- Grant Mulvey
- Bob Nystrom
- Harvie Pocza
- Gary Rissling
- Mike Rogers
- Randy Rota
- Rick Shinske
- Roy Sommer
- Brian Spencer
- Mike Toal
- Perry Turnbull
- Jimmy Watson

== See also ==
- List of ice hockey teams in Alberta
- Ice hockey in Calgary
