= 1969–70 WCHL season =

Canadian ice hockey league season

- League: Western Hockey League
- Sport: Ice hockey
- Teams: 8

Regular season
- Season champions: Flin Flon Bombers (3)
- Season MVP: Reggie Leach (Flin Flon Bombers)
- Top scorer: Reggie Leach (Flin Flon Bombers)

Playoffs
- Finals champions: Flin Flon Bombers (2)
- Runners-up: Edmonton Oil Kings

WHL seasons
- 1968–69 1970–71

The 1969–70 WCHL season was the fourth season of the Western Canada Hockey League (WCHL). It featured eight teams and a 60-game regular season. The Flin Flon Bombers topped the season standings for a third consecutive year, posting 42 wins, and in the playoffs won their second consecutive President's Cup, defeating the Edmonton Oil Kings in a rematch of the previous season's final.

== League business ==
=== Dispute with CAHA ===
The WCHL annual meeting was held June 19 to 21 in Calgary. The WCHL planned to operate the 1969–70 season with the same eight teams from the previous season. Twenty players from the WCHL were chosen in the 1969 NHL amateur draft. Since the WCHL was operating under the jurisdiction of the Canadian Hockey Association instead of the Canadian Amateur Hockey Association (CAHA), league president Ron Butlin initiated legal action for draft payments made by the National Hockey League (NHL) to CAHA. Internally, the WCHL reached a gate receipt sharing plan, where larger cities in the league would assist the smaller cities.

A tentative agreement between the WCHL and CAHA was announced on July 30, 1969, whereby the WCHL would rejoin CAHA. According to the agreement, the WCHL would not expand before 1970, and would not have representation on the CAHA's junior committee before then either. There were no plans included for the WCHL to participate in the 1970 Memorial Cup. Outstanding fees from the NHL draft would be paid out, and WCHL teams would not be allowed to deal directly with the NHL. WCHL teams would be allowed to claim a maximum of one player from lower-tier CAHA teams. The WCHL still wanted to reserve the right to place a club anywhere in Western Canada without seeking CAHA approval. By September, neither the CAHA nor the WCHL had approved the tentative agreement.

Butlin stated that peace talks with CAHA had stalled due to financial issues, and the league would begin its season outside of CAHA jurisdiction. He stated that the WCHL wanted the development fees released to its teams immediately, whereas CAHA reportedly wanted to hold the money as a bond in good faith until May 1970. CAHA president Earl Dawson granted an extension until October 8, 1969, for the WCHL to decide. A joint meeting with the NHL was refused since the professionals deemed it an amateur issue. Dawson terminated negotiations on October 9, although individual teams in the WCHL were still welcomed to apply for CAHA membership. WCHL teams were reportedly offered $5,000 per team in subsidies from CAHA, less than the $7,000 given to teams in the Ontario Hockey Association (OHA). After it was apparent the WCHL would not rejoin CAHA, the WCHL and the OHA began to compete for players from each other's leagues. On October 17, 1969, the WCHL resumed legal action to recover development payments from the NHL made to CAHA.

The Western Ontario Junior A Hockey League wanted to continue the east-west Canadian Hockey Association final series, and felt that their teams were stronger than in the previous season due to more over-age players on its rosters. Butlin was hesitant to agree due to the previous year's final being incomplete and concerns about an imbalance of talent.

A meeting in March 1970 between the WCHL and CAHA to resolve all differences ended after just 15 minutes. Butlin reported that the WCHL was asked to accept the same conditions as any other junior league under CAHA jurisdiction, instead of recognizing existing grievances. The main issues between the WCHL and CAHA were the transfer of players between provinces, the number of over-age players permitted per team, the payment of development fees from the NHL, subsidies from CAHA for operational costs, participation in the Memorial Cup final, the sharing of profits from playoffs, and the right to relocate any franchise without CAHA approval.

=== 1970 World Championships ===
The Winnipeg Free Press reported that Butlin would agree to let WCHL players participate on the Canadian national team when the 1970 World Championships were scheduled to be hosted in Canada. After Canada withdrew from international play and hosting the World Championships, Butlin gave permission for WCHL teams to sign players from the Canadian national team, providing that players had fulfilled their contractual obligations. He later retracted that permission since the WCHL constitution did not allow players to be signed after February 10, for any reason.

=== Expansion ===
The Medicine Hat Tigers were accepted as a new team for the 1970–71 season. Butlin attempted to expand the WCHL westward into British Columbia, inviting the Victoria Cougars of the British Columbia Junior Hockey League to join. He also wanted to see teams in Vancouver and New Westminster. The Cougars' owners made it known publicly they were interested in the WCHL, as did the owners of the Vancouver Centennials. However, westward expansion was resisted by some WCHL team owners due to the concerns over the calibre of the B.C. teams, and over travel costs and time, and the impact of travel on players' schooling.

== Regular season ==
=== Final standings ===
East Division
Pos	Team	Pld	W	L	T	GF	GA	Pts
1	Flin Flon Bombers	60	42	18	0	257	176	84
2	Estevan Bruins	60	28	31	1	237	255	57
3	Winnipeg Jets	60	25	33	2	226	235	52
4	Brandon Wheat Kings	60	23	34	3	234	272	49

West Division
Pos	Team	Pld	W	L	T	GF	GA	Pts
1	Calgary Centennials	60	37	22	1	249	197	75
2	Edmonton Oil Kings	60	35	25	0	254	217	70
3	Swift Current Broncos	60	27	31	2	240	265	56
4	Saskatoon Blades	60	18	41	1	202	282	37

=== Scoring leaders ===
Note: GP = Games played; G = Goals; A = Assists; Pts = Points; PIM = Penalties in minutes

Player	Team	GP	G	A	Pts	PIM
Reggie Leach	Flin Flon Bombers	57	65	46	111	168
Greg Polis	Estevan Bruins	60	48	56	104	99
Chris Oddleifson	Winnipeg Jets	59	31	64	95	243
Lorne Henning	Estevan Bruins	60	40	52	92	33
Randy Rota	Calgary Centennials	60	43	47	90	43
Jim Nichols	Saskatoon Blades	60	37	53	90	38
Laurie Yaworski (Note: Laurie Yaworski, while finishing as one of the top-10 WCHL scoring leaders in both the 1969–70 and 1970–71 WCHL seasons, was not drafted in either the 1969 nor 1970 NHL Amateur Drafts, and played less than one full season of professional ice hockey, appearing in 59 games in the 1972–73 season, split across three different minor leagues: the AHL's Richmond Robins (7 games); the WHL's San Diego Gulls (28 games); and the IHL's Dayton Gems and Flint Generals (24 games, Dayton-Flint split unknown).)	Saskatoon Blades	55	48	41	89	139
Jerry Wright (Note: Jerry Wright, while drafted in the 5th round of the 1969 NHL Amateur Draft, and again in the 70th round of the 1972 WHA General Player Draft, played less than one full season of professional ice hockey, appearing in 55 of the 73 games of the minor league Roanoke Valley Rebels in the EHL's 1971–72 season.)	Calgary Centennials	57	33	45	78	34
Billy Moores	Edmonton Oil Kings	58	31	46	77	83
Don Kozak	Swift Current Broncos	56	40	34	74	67

== League playoffs ==
=== Quarterfinals ===
- Flin Flon defeated Brandon 4 games to 0
- Winnipeg defeated Estevan 4 games to 1
- Edmonton defeated Swift Current 4 games to 1
- Calgary defeated Saskatoon 4 games to 3

=== Semifinals ===
- Flin Flon defeated Winnipeg 5 games to 4
- Edmonton defeated Calgary 4 games to 3 (2 ties)

=== Finals ===
- Flin Flon defeated Edmonton 4 games to 0

== All-Star game ==
The 1969–70 WCHL all-star game was held in Edmonton, Alberta, with the WCHL All-stars defeating the Edmonton Oil Kings 7–2 before a crowd of 4,753.

== Awards ==
Most Valuable Player: Reggie Leach, Flin Flon Bombers
Top Scorer: Reggie Leach, Flin Flon Bombers
Most Sportsmanlike Player: Randy Rota, Calgary Centennials
Defenseman of the Year: Jim Hargreaves, Winnipeg Jets
Rookie of the Year: Gene Carr, Flin Flon Bombers
Goaltender of the Year: Ray Martyniuk, Flin Flon Bombers
Regular Season Champions: Flin Flon Bombers

== All-star team ==
- Goaltender: Ray Martyniuk, Flin Flon Bombers
- Defenceman: Jim Hargreaves, Winnipeg Jets
- Defenceman: Murray Anderson, Flin Flon Bombers
- Centerman: Chris Oddleifson, Winnipeg Jets
- Left winger: Greg Polis, Estevan Bruins
- Right winger: Reggie Leach, Flin Flon Bombers

== See also ==
- 1969 in sports
- 1970 in sports

== Trivia ==
Preceded by 1968–69 WCHL season	WHL seasons	Succeeded by 1970–71 WCHL season
