= 1971–72 NHL transactions =

The following is a list of all team-to-team transactions that have occurred in the National Hockey League during the 1971–72 NHL season. It lists what team each player has been traded to, signed by, or claimed by, and for which player(s) or draft pick(s), if applicable.

== Trades ==
=== May ===
May, 1971 (exact date unknown)	To Boston Bruins cash	To Pittsburgh Penguins Bob Leiter
May, 1971 (exact date unknown)	To Minnesota North Stars Bob Paradise; Gary Gambucci	To Montreal Canadiens cash
May 1, 1971	To Los Angeles Kings Wayne Rivers	To New York Rangers Mike McMahon Jr.
May 12, 1971	To Detroit Red Wings Rick Sentes	To St. Louis Blues Jim Shires
May 20, 1971	To California Golden Seals Joey Johnston; Walt McKechnie	To Minnesota North Stars Dennis Hextall
May 25, 1971	To California Golden Seals Bobby Sheehan	To Montreal Canadiens cash
May 25, 1971	To Buffalo Sabres Don Luce; Mike Robitaille	To Detroit Red Wings Joe Daley
May 25, 1971	To Detroit Red Wings Leon Rochefort	To Montreal Canadiens Kerry Ketter cash
May 25, 1971	To New York Rangers 1st-round pick - 1971 Amateur Draft (# 10 - Steve Vickers)	To St. Louis Blues Peter McDuffe
May 25, 1971	To Minnesota North Stars Bob Nevin	To New York Rangers future considerations^{1} (Bobby Rousseau)
May 25, 1971	To Montreal Canadiens 3rd-round pick - 1971 Amateur Draft (# 31 - Jim Cahoon); 4th-round pick - 1971 Amateur Draft (# 45 - Ed Sidebottom) cash	To Vancouver Canucks Gregg Boddy; 3rd-round pick - 1971 Amateur Draft (# 39 - Richard Lemieux)

1. Trade completed on June 8, 1971.

=== June ===
June 8, 1971	To Detroit Red Wings Bob Dillabough; Irv Spencer	To Vancouver Canucks Gary Bredin; John Cunniff
June 8, 1971	To Los Angeles Kings Claude Provost	To Montreal Canadiens cash
June 9, 1971	To California Golden Seals Mike Hyndman	To Montreal Canadiens cash
June 9, 1971	To Montreal Canadiens Ed Dyck	To Vancouver Canucks cash
June 10, 1971	To Chicago Black Hawks cash	To New York Rangers 7th-round pick - 1971 Amateur Draft (# 96 - Doug Keeler)
June 10, 1971	To Boston Bruins cash	To Toronto Maple Leafs 7th-round pick - 1971 Amateur Draft (# 98 - Steve Johnson)
June 13, 1971	To Los Angeles Kings Larry Hillman	To Philadelphia Flyers Larry Mickey
June 14, 1971	To New York Rangers cash	To St. Louis Blues Glenn Patrick
June 15, 1971	To Chicago Black Hawks cash	To Detroit Red Wings Barry Salovaara

=== August ===
August 20, 1971	To Detroit Red Wings Brian Conacher	To Toronto Maple Leafs cash
August 23, 1971	To Montreal Canadiens Michel Plasse	To St. Louis Blues cash
August 30, 1971	To Montreal Canadiens cash	To Toronto Maple Leafs Terry Clancy
August 31, 1971	To California Golden Seals Marshall Johnston	To Montreal Canadiens cash

=== September ===
September 4, 1971	To California Golden Seals cash	To Pittsburgh Penguins Bill Hicke
September 4, 1971	To Boston Bruins Doug Roberts	To California Golden Seals cash
September 9, 1971	To California Golden Seals Kerry Bond; Gerry Desjardins; Gerry Pinder	To Chicago Black Hawks Gary Smith
September 14, 1971	To Montreal Canadiens Rey Comeau	To Vancouver Canucks cash
September 27, 1971	To Toronto Maple Leafs Andre Hinse	To Vancouver Canucks Doug Brindley

=== October ===
October, 1971 (exact date unknown)	To Los Angeles Kings Wayne Rivers	To New York Rangers Mike McMahon Jr.
October, 1971 (exact date unknown)	To California Golden Seals cash	To Montreal Canadiens Mike Laughton
October, 1971 (exact date unknown)	To California Golden Seals cash	To Montreal Canadiens Jocelyn Hardy
October 3, 1971	To Pittsburgh Penguins cash	To Vancouver Canucks Bob Blackburn
October 6, 1971	To Minnesota North Stars Dean Prentice	To Pittsburgh Penguins cash
October 6, 1971	To California Golden Seals Ray Martynuik	To Montreal Canadiens Tony Featherstone
October 8, 1971	To California Golden Seals Lyle Carter; John French	To Montreal Canadiens Randy Rota
October 15, 1971	To Chicago Black Hawks Andre Lacroix	To Philadelphia Flyers Rick Foley
October 18, 1971	To California Golden Seals Gilles Meloche; Paul Shmyr	To Chicago Black Hawks Gerry Desjardins
October 22, 1971	To California Golden Seals Tom Webster	To Detroit Red Wings Ron Stackhouse

=== November ===
November 4, 1971	To Los Angeles Kings Rogie Vachon	To Montreal Canadiens Denis DeJordy; Dale Hoganson; Noel Price; Doug Robinson draft option^{1}
November 9, 1971	To Detroit Red Wings Bill Sutherland	To St. Louis Blues cash
November 11, 1971	To Montreal Canadiens cash	To St. Louis Blues Bernie Blanchette
November 15, 1971	To New York Rangers Gene Carr; Wayne Connelly; Jim Lorentz	To St. Louis Blues Andre Dupont; Jack Egers; Mike Murphy
November 16, 1971	To Buffalo Sabres Larry Mickey	To Philadelphia Flyers Larry Keenan
November 16, 1971	To New York Rangers Gary Doak; Jim Wiste	To Vancouver Canucks Dave Balon; Wayne Connelly; Ron Stewart
November 17, 1971	To Boston Bruins Rich LeDuc; Chris Oddleifson	To California Golden Seals Ivan Boldirev
November 21, 1971	To Detroit Red Wings Bob Cook	To Vancouver Canucks cash
November 22, 1971	To Detroit Red Wings Bill Hicke	To Pittsburgh Penguins cash

1. Montreal had an option to swap 1st-round picks in the 1975 NHL Amateur Draft. Montreal exercised the option and selected Pierre Mondou with the number 15 pick and Los Angeles selected Tim Young with the number 16 pick.

=== December ===
December 13, 1971	To Montreal Canadiens Jim Roberts	To St. Louis Blues Phil Roberto
December 16, 1971	To Buffalo Sabres Mike Byers; Larry Hillman	To Los Angeles Kings Doug Barrie; Mike Keeler

=== January ===
January 7, 1972	To Minnesota North Stars Craig Cameron	To New York Islanders Jude Drouin
January 11, 1972	To Los Angeles Kings Bob Woytowich	To Pittsburgh Penguins Al McDonough
January 14, 1972	To Buffalo Sabres Jim Lorentz	To New York Rangers 2nd-round pick in 1972 Amateur Draft (# 21 - Larry Sacharuk)
January 28, 1972	To Los Angeles Kings Serge Bernier; Jim Johnson; Bill Lesuk	To Philadelphia Flyers Bill Flett; Eddie Joyal; Ross Lonsberry; Jean Potvin

=== February ===
February 8, 1972	To Chicago Black Hawks Christian Bordeleau future considerations (John Garrett)^{1}	To St. Louis Blues Danny O'Shea
February 20, 1972	To New York Rangers Jim Dorey	To Toronto Maple Leafs Pierre Jarry
February 23, 1972	To Boston Bruins Don O'Donoghue; Carol Vadnais	To California Golden Seals Reggie Leach; Rick Smith; Bob Stewart
February 26, 1972	To Chicago Black Hawks cash	To Vancouver Canucks Bruce Bullock

1. Trade completed on September 19, 1972.

=== March ===
March 4, 1972	To Buffalo Sabres Rene Robert	To Pittsburgh Penguins Eddie Shack
March 5, 1972	To Buffalo Sabres George Morrison; 2nd-round pick - 1972 Amateur Draft (# 25 - Larry Carriere)	To St. Louis Blues Chris Evans
March 5, 1972	To Buffalo Sabres cash	To New York Rangers Phil Goyette
March 5, 1972	To New York Rangers Ron Stewart	To Vancouver Canucks cash
March 5, 1972	To Boston Bruins Tom Williams	To California Golden Seals cash
March 6, 1972	To Detroit Red Wings Ralph Williams	To Vancouver Canucks Jim Niekamp

== Additional sources ==
- hockeydb.com - search for player and select "show trades"
- "NHL trades for 1971-1972". NHL Trade Tracker.
