= 1971–72 St. Louis Blues season =

National Hockey League team season

1971–72 St. Louis Blues
- Division: 3rd West
- 1971–72 record: 28–39–11
- Home record: 17–17–5
- Road record: 11–22–6
- Goals for: 208
- Goals against: 247

Team information
- General manager: Sid Abel
- Coach: Sid Abel (3-6-1); Bill McCreary (6-14-4); Al Arbour (19-19-6)
- Captain: Jim Roberts (traded Dec. 13th)
- Alternate captains: Frank St. Marseille; Terry Crisp; Bob Plager; Barclay Plager
- Arena: St. Louis Arena

Team leaders
- Goals: Garry Unger (36)
- Assists: Frank St. Marseille (36)
- Points: Garry Unger (70)
- Penalty minutes: Barclay Plager (176)
- Wins: Jacques Caron (14)
- Goals against average: Jacques Caron (2.52)

The 1971–72 St. Louis Blues season was the fifth for the franchise in St. Louis, Missouri. The Blues finished the season in third place in the Western Division, with a record of 28 wins, 39 losses and 11 ties, good for 67 points, placing them in the playoffs, where they defeated the Minnesota North Stars 4–3 in the first round, before losing to the eventual Stanley Cup champion Boston Bruins in four straight in round two.

== Regular season ==
=== Final standings ===
West Division
		GP	W	L	T	GF	GA	DIFF	Pts
1	Chicago Black Hawks	78	46	17	15	256	166	+90	107
2	Minnesota North Stars	78	37	29	12	212	191	+21	86
3	St. Louis Blues	78	28	39	11	208	247	−39	67
4	Pittsburgh Penguins	78	26	38	14	220	258	−38	66
5	Philadelphia Flyers	78	26	38	14	200	236	−36	66
6	California Golden Seals	78	21	39	18	216	288	−72	60
7	Los Angeles Kings	78	20	49	9	206	305	−99	49

=== Record vs. opponents ===
==== Vs. West Division ====
1971–72 NHL records
Team	CAL	CHI	LAK	MIN	PHI	PIT	STL	Total
California	—	1–4–1	3–2–1	1–4–1	2–4	2–2–2	0–3–3	9–19–8
Chicago	4–1–1	—	5–1	5–1	3–2–1	5–0–1	6–0	28–5–3
Los Angeles	2–3–1	1–5	—	0–6	2–3–1	1–4–1	2–4	8–25–3
Minnesota	4–1–1	1–5	6–0	—	3–1–2	4–2	4–2	22–11–3
Philadelphia	4–2	2–3–1	3–2–1	1–3–2	—	2–3–1	1–2–3	13–15–8
Pittsburgh	2–2–2	0–5–1	4–1–1	2–4	3–2–1	—	3–3	14–17–5
St. Louis	3–0–3	0–6	4–2	2–4	2–1–3	3–3	—	14–16–6

==== Vs. East Division ====
1971–72 NHL records
Team	BOS	BUF	DET	MTL	NYR	TOR	VAN	Total
California	2–4	3–0–3	2–2–2	0–3–3	1–4–1	2–3–1	2–4	12–20–10
Chicago	1–4–1	3–2–1	5–0–1	1–2–3	1–2–3	4–0–2	3–2–1	18–12–12
Los Angeles	1–4–1	3–2–1	2–3–1	0–5–1	0–6	1–4–1	5–0–1	12–24–6
Minnesota	0–5–1	2–2–2	4–2	1–4–1	3–1–2	2–2–2	3–2–1	15–18–9
Philadelphia	0–6	2–2–2	2–3–1	2–3–1	0–6	2–2–2	5–1	13–23–6
Pittsburgh	1–2–3	1–2–3	2–4	1–4–1	1–3–2	2–4	4–2	12–21–9
St. Louis	1–4–1	4–1–1	3–2–1	1–4–1	1–5	2–4	2–3–1	14–23–5

== Schedule and results ==
1971–72 regular season
October

Game	Result	Date	Score	Opponent	Record
1	L	October 9, 1971	2–4	Chicago Black Hawks (1971–72)	0–1–0
2	W	October 12, 1971	4–1	Buffalo Sabres (1971–72)	1–1–0
3	L	October 13, 1971	0–1	@ Chicago Black Hawks (1971–72)	1–2–0
4	W	October 16, 1971	9–2	Detroit Red Wings (1971–72)	2–2–0
5	L	October 17, 1971	3–5	@ Detroit Red Wings (1971–72)	2–3–0
6	L	October 19, 1971	1–3	Vancouver Canucks (1971–72)	2–4–0
7	L	October 23, 1971	3–4	New York Rangers (1971–72)	2–5–0
8	W	October 24, 1971	3–2	@ Buffalo Sabres (1971–72)	3–5–0
9	L	October 27, 1971	1–2	Minnesota North Stars (1971–72)	3–6–0
10	T	October 30, 1971	4–4	Philadelphia Flyers (1971–72)	3–6–1

November

Game	Result	Date	Score	Opponent	Record
11	L	November 3, 1971	1–5	@ Montreal Canadiens (1971–72)	3–7–1
12	L	November 4, 1971	1–6	@ Boston Bruins (1971–72)	3–8–1
13	L	November 6, 1971	1–5	@ Minnesota North Stars (1971–72)	3–9–1
14	L	November 9, 1971	1–4	Pittsburgh Penguins (1971–72)	3–10–1
15	W	November 13, 1971	5–1	California Golden Seals (1971–72)	4–10–1
16	T	November 16, 1971	2–2	Detroit Red Wings (1971–72)	4–10–2
17	T	November 18, 1971	2–2	@ Montreal Canadiens (1971–72)	4–10–3
18	W	November 20, 1971	4–2	@ Pittsburgh Penguins (1971–72)	5–10–3
19	L	November 21, 1971	2–6	@ Boston Bruins (1971–72)	5–11–3
20	W	November 23, 1971	3–1	Los Angeles Kings (1971–72)	6–11–3
21	L	November 24, 1971	3–8	@ New York Rangers (1971–72)	6–12–3
22	T	November 27, 1971	6–6	Boston Bruins (1971–72)	6–12–4
23	W	November 30, 1971	5–2	California Golden Seals (1971–72)	7–12–4

December

Game	Result	Date	Score	Opponent	Record
24	L	December 1, 1971	2–4	@ Toronto Maple Leafs (1971–72)	7–13–4
25	W	December 4, 1971	5–1	Buffalo Sabres (1971–72)	8–13–4
26	W	December 5, 1971	2–1	@ Detroit Red Wings (1971–72)	9–13–4
27	L	December 7, 1971	1–2	@ Vancouver Canucks (1971–72)	9–14–4
28	T	December 10, 1971	4–4	@ California Golden Seals (1971–72)	9–14–5
29	L	December 11, 1971	1–4	@ Los Angeles Kings (1971–72)	9–15–5
30	L	December 14, 1971	2–4	Toronto Maple Leafs (1971–72)	9–16–5
31	L	December 15, 1971	1–4	@ Minnesota North Stars (1971–72)	9–17–5
32	L	December 18, 1971	2–5	New York Rangers (1971–72)	9–18–5
33	L	December 19, 1971	0–2	@ Chicago Black Hawks (1971–72)	9–19–5
34	L	December 22, 1971	1–2	Los Angeles Kings (1971–72)	9–20–5
35	T	December 25, 1971	4–4	Buffalo Sabres (1971–72)	9–20–6
36	L	December 26, 1971	3–6	@ Buffalo Sabres (1971–72)	9–21–6
37	W	December 29, 1971	6–3	@ Toronto Maple Leafs (1971–72)	10–21–6

January

Game	Result	Date	Score	Opponent	Record
38	T	January 1, 1972	4–4	Philadelphia Flyers (1971–72)	10–21–7
39	L	January 5, 1972	1–9	@ New York Rangers (1971–72)	10–22–7
40	W	January 6, 1972	3–2	@ Philadelphia Flyers (1971–72)	11–22–7
41	W	January 8, 1972	5–3	Boston Bruins (1971–72)	12–22–7
42	W	January 11, 1972	7–3	Montreal Canadiens (1971–72)	13–22–7
43	W	January 15, 1972	7–2	Minnesota North Stars (1971–72)	14–22–7
44	W	January 16, 1972	4–3	@ Toronto Maple Leafs (1971–72)	15–22–7
45	L	January 18, 1972	0–2	Boston Bruins (1971–72)	15–23–7
46	W	January 22, 1972	1–0	Pittsburgh Penguins (1971–72)	16–23–7
47	L	January 23, 1972	1–3	@ Detroit Red Wings (1971–72)	16–24–7
48	W	January 26, 1972	2–1	@ Pittsburgh Penguins (1971–72)	17–24–7
49	L	January 29, 1972	0–4	@ Montreal Canadiens (1971–72)	17–25–7
50	L	January 30, 1972	2–5	@ Boston Bruins (1971–72)	17–26–7

February

Game	Result	Date	Score	Opponent	Record
51	L	February 1, 1972	1–3	Montreal Canadiens (1971–72)	17–27–7
52	L	February 3, 1972	3–4	Pittsburgh Penguins (1971–72)	17–28–7
53	W	February 5, 1972	6–5	New York Rangers (1971–72)	18–28–7
54	T	February 6, 1972	2–2	@ Philadelphia Flyers (1971–72)	18–28–8
55	L	February 8, 1972	1–2	Toronto Maple Leafs (1971–72)	18–29–8
56	L	February 10, 1972	1–3	Minnesota North Stars (1971–72)	18–30–8
57	W	February 12, 1972	5–4	Vancouver Canucks (1971–72)	19–30–8
58	L	February 15, 1972	2–3	Chicago Black Hawks (1971–72)	19–31–8
59	W	February 16, 1972	3–1	@ Los Angeles Kings (1971–72)	20–31–8
60	L	February 18, 1972	2–5	@ Vancouver Canucks (1971–72)	20–32–8
61	T	February 20, 1972	4–4	@ California Golden Seals (1971–72)	20–32–9
62	W	February 23, 1972	2–0	@ Los Angeles Kings (1971–72)	21–32–9
63	W	February 26, 1972	3–2	@ Minnesota North Stars (1971–72)	22–32–9
64	L	February 27, 1972	0–2	@ New York Rangers (1971–72)	22–33–9

March

Game	Result	Date	Score	Opponent	Record
65	L	March 1, 1972	1–3	Toronto Maple Leafs (1971–72)	22–34–9
66	L	March 4, 1972	2–6	@ Philadelphia Flyers (1971–72)	22–35–9
67	W	March 5, 1972	6–2	@ Buffalo Sabres (1971–72)	23–35–9
68	W	March 7, 1972	4–2	Los Angeles Kings (1971–72)	24–35–9
69	L	March 9, 1972	1–5	Montreal Canadiens (1971–72)	24–36–9
70	W	March 11, 1972	4–2	Philadelphia Flyers (1971–72)	25–36–9
71	T	March 17, 1972	2–2	@ California Golden Seals (1971–72)	25–36–10
72	T	March 19, 1972	3–3	@ Vancouver Canucks (1971–72)	25–36–11
73	W	March 22, 1972	4–1	California Golden Seals (1971–72)	26–36–11
74	W	March 25, 1972	5–3	Detroit Red Wings (1971–72)	27–36–11
75	L	March 26, 1972	0–4	@ Chicago Black Hawks (1971–72)	27–37–11
76	W	March 28, 1972	2–1	Vancouver Canucks (1971–72)	28–37–11

April

Game	Result	Date	Score	Opponent	Record
77	L	April 1, 1972	0–2	Chicago Black Hawks (1971–72)	28–38–11
78	L	April 2, 1972	2–6	@ Pittsburgh Penguins (1971–72)	28–39–11

Legend: Win (2 points) Loss (0 points) Tie (1 point)

== Playoffs ==
=== Quarterfinals: (W2) Minnesota North Stars vs. (W3) St. Louis Blues ===
April 5	St. Louis Blues	0–3	Minnesota North Stars	Met Center	Recap
No scoring		First period	14:25 – Dean Prentice (1)
No scoring		Second period	No scoring
No scoring		Third period	04:19 – Dean Prentice (2); 12:01 – Bob Nevin (1)
Jacques Caron 41 saves / 44 shots		Goalie stats	Gump Worsley 27 saves / 27 shots

April 6	St. Louis Blues	5–6	OT	Minnesota North Stars	Met Center	Recap
Frank St. Marseille (1) – pp – 12:14		First period		02:51 – pp – Doug Mohns (1)
Frank St. Marseille (2) – 02:00; Frank St. Marseille (3) – 05:38		Second period		04:27 – pp – J. P. Parise (1); 07:38 – Danny Grant (1)
Garry Unger (1) – 08:05; Phil Roberto (1) – 10:59		Third period		01:45 – Jude Drouin (1); 11:32 – Dean Prentice (3)
No scoring		First overtime period		01:36 – Bill Goldsworthy (1)
Ernie Wakely 23 saves / 29 shots		Goalie stats		Cesare Maniago 33 saves / 38 shots

April 8	Minnesota North Stars	1–2	St. Louis Blues	St. Louis Arena	Recap
No scoring		First period	09:28 – Phil Roberto (2)
No scoring		Second period	10:07 – pp – Phil Roberto (3)
Jude Drouin (2) – pp – 00:40		Third period	No scoring
Gump Worsley 33 saves / 35 shots		Goalie stats	Jacques Caron 29 saves / 30 shots

April 9	Minnesota North Stars	2–3	St. Louis Blues	St. Louis Arena	Recap
Jude Drouin (3) – 10:56		First period	No scoring
Danny Grant (2) – 00:21		Second period	12:12 – Phil Roberto (4); 13:45 – Kevin O'Shea (1)
No scoring		Third period	11:50 – pp – Barclay Plager (1)
Cesare Maniago 35 saves / 38 shots		Goalie stats	Jacques Caron 28 saves / 30 shots

April 11	St. Louis Blues	3–4	Minnesota North Stars	Met Center	Recap
Gary Sabourin (1) – 16:34; Phil Roberto (5) – pp – 19:59		First period	01:42 – Barry Gibbs (1); 17:55 – Tom Reid (1)
Garry Unger (2) – pp – 19:34		Second period	No scoring
No scoring		Third period	02:55 – pp – J. P. Parise (2); 05:45 – Jude Drouin (4)
Jacques Caron 23 saves / 27 shots		Goalie stats	Gump Worsley 30 saves / 33 shots

April 13	Minnesota North Stars	2–4	St. Louis Blues	St. Louis Arena	Recap
Bill Goldsworthy (2) – 04:03		First period	03:04 – pp – Phil Roberto (6); 06:21 – Bob Plager (1)
No scoring		Second period	11:07 – Garry Unger (3)
J. P. Parise (3) – 15:01		Third period	16:13 – Jack Egers (1)
Gump Worsley 11 saves / 13 shots Cesare Maniago 23 saves / 25 shots		Goalie stats	Jacques Caron 28 saves / 30 shots

April 16	St. Louis Blues	2–1	OT	Minnesota North Stars	Met Center	Recap
Gary Sabourin (2) – 12:04		First period		No scoring
No scoring		Second period		No scoring
No scoring		Third period		00:15 – Charlie Burns (1)
Kevin O'Shea (2) – 10:07		First overtime period		No scoring
Jacques Caron 28 saves / 29 shots		Goalie stats		Cesare Maniago 25 saves / 27 shots

St. Louis won series 4–3

=== Semifinals: (E1) Boston Bruins vs. (W3) St. Louis Blues ===
April 18	St. Louis Blues	1–6	Boston Bruins	Boston Garden	Recap
Garry Unger (4) – pp – 03:18		First period	04:22 – Fred Stanfield (4); 11:03 – Mike Walton (2); 17:27 – Johnny Bucyk (3)
No scoring		Second period	10:48 – pp – Fred Stanfield (5); 19:32 – Fred Stanfield (6)
No scoring		Third period	14:55 – pp – Phil Esposito (5)
Jacques Caron 21 saves / 26 shots Ernie Wakely 17 saves / 18 shots		Goalie stats	Eddie Johnston 25 saves / 26 shots

April 20	St. Louis Blues	2–10	Boston Bruins	Boston Garden	Recap
No scoring		First period	07:17 – pp – Johnny Bucyk (4); 08:39 – Phil Esposito (6); 09:54 – Ed Westfall (2)
No scoring		Second period	06:33 – Garnet Bailey (1); 09:27 – pp – John McKenzie (3)
Mike Murphy (1) – 04:37; Phil Roberto (7) – 05:26		Third period	03:47 – pp – Johnny Bucyk (5); 10:34 – Mike Walton (3); 14:29 – Don Marcotte (2); 16:07 – Johnny Bucyk (6); 16:47 – Ed Westfall (3)
Jacques Caron 9 saves / 13 shots Ernie Wakely 12 saves / 18 shots		Goalie stats	Gerry Cheevers 31 saves / 33 shots

April 23	Boston Bruins	7–2	St. Louis Blues	St. Louis Arena	Recap
Ed Westfall (4) – sh – 08:40; John McKenzie (4) – pp – 10:36; Phil Esposito (7) – 19:42		First period	02:05 – pp – Mike Murphy (2)
Mike Walton (4) – 02:58; Ken Hodge (4) – 06:28; John McKenzie (5) – pp – 11:12		Second period	No scoring
Mike Walton (5) – 11:09		Third period	18:15 – Gary Sabourin (3)
Eddie Johnston 27 saves / 29 shots		Goalie stats	Peter McDuffe 31 saves / 38 shots

April 25	Boston Bruins	5–3	St. Louis Blues	St. Louis Arena	Recap
Phil Esposito (8) – 01:29; Johnny Bucyk (7) – pp – 09:27		First period	18:16 – Terry Crisp (1)
Johnny Bucyk (8) – pp – 04:44; Phil Esposito (9) – pp – 17:53		Second period	No scoring
Wayne Cashman (1) – 19:22		Third period	08:50 – Andre Dupont (1); 15:25 – Chris Evans (1)
Gerry Cheevers 33 saves / 36 shots		Goalie stats	Jacques Caron 22 saves / 26 shots

Boston won series 4–0

== Player statistics ==
=== Regular season ===
Scoring

Player	Pos	GP	G	A	Pts	PIM	+/-	PPG	SHG	GWG
Garry Unger	C	78	36	34	70	104	-8	14	1	4
Frank St. Marseille	RW	78	16	36	52	32	5	1	0	1
Jack Egers	RW	63	21	25	46	34	5	5	0	2
Gary Sabourin	RW	77	28	17	45	52	3	4	0	7
Mike Murphy	RW	63	20	23	43	19	-4	5	0	3
Terry Crisp	C	75	13	18	31	12	7	1	6	3
Barclay Plager	D	78	7	22	29	176	6	1	2	0
Phil Roberto	RW	49	12	13	25	76	-1	0	0	0
Carl Brewer	D	42	2	16	18	40	-6	0	0	1
Christian Bordeleau	C	41	8	9	17	6	-13	1	0	1
Brian Lavender	LW	46	5	11	16	54	-2	0	0	1
Andre Dupont	D	60	3	10	13	147	11	0	0	0
George Morrison	LW	42	2	11	13	7	-11	2	0	1
Jim Roberts	D/RW	26	5	7	12	4	4	1	2	0
Bill Plager	D	65	1	11	12	64	-15	0	0	1
Bob Plager	D	50	4	7	11	81	-1	0	0	0
Larry Hornung	D	47	2	9	11	10	-1	0	0	1
Wayne Connelly	C	15	5	5	10	2	-6	2	0	0
Floyd Thomson	LW	49	4	6	10	48	-9	0	0	2
Curt Bennett	LW	31	3	5	8	30	-4	0	0	0
Danny O'Shea	C	20	3	3	6	11	-4	0	0	0
Noel Picard	D	15	1	5	6	50	1	0	0	0
Gene Carr	C	15	3	2	5	9	0	0	0	0
Bill Sutherland	C	9	2	3	5	2	4	0	1	0
Gerry Odrowski	D	55	1	2	3	8	-1	0	1	0
Michel Parizeau	C	21	1	2	3	8	-1	1	0	0
Jim Shires	LW	18	0	3	3	8	-13	0	0	0
Jacques Caron	G	28	0	1	1	0	0	0	0	0
Jim Lorentz	C/RW	12	0	1	1	12	-8	0	0	0
Jim McLeod	G	16	0	1	1	0	0	0	0	0
Ernie Wakely	G	30	0	1	1	2	0	0	0	0
John Arbour	D	17	0	0	0	10	-4	0	0	0
Gord Brooks	RW	2	0	0	0	0	0	0	0	0
Norm Dennis	C	1	0	0	0	4	-1	0	0	0
Chris Evans	D	2	0	0	0	0	0	0	0	0
Gord Kannegiesser	D	4	0	0	0	2	-1	0	0	0
Peter McDuffe	G	10	0	0	0	0	0	0	0	0
Kevin O'Shea	RW	4	0	0	0	2	-1	0	0	0
Brit Selby	LW	6	0	0	0	0	-2	0	0	0
Wayne Stephenson	G	2	0	0	0	0	0	0	0	0
Gary Veneruzzo	W	2	0	0	0	0	-1	0	0	0

Goaltending

Player	MIN	GP	W	L	T	GA	GAA	SO
Jacques Caron	1619	28	14	8	5	68	2.52	1
Ernie Wakely	1614	30	8	18	2	92	3.42	1
Jim McLeod	880	16	6	6	4	44	3.00	0
Peter McDuffe	467	10	0	6	0	29	3.73	0
Wayne Stephenson	100	2	0	1	0	9	5.40	0
Team:	4680	78	28	39	11	242	3.10	2

=== Playoffs ===
Scoring

Player	Pos	GP	G	A	Pts	PIM	PPG	SHG	GWG
Phil Roberto	RW	11	7	6	13	29	3	0	1
Garry Unger	C	11	4	5	9	35	2	0	1
Frank St. Marseille	RW	11	3	5	8	6	1	0	0
Gary Sabourin	RW	11	3	3	6	6	0	0	0
Mike Murphy	RW	11	2	3	5	6	1	0	0
Jack Egers	RW	11	1	4	5	14	0	0	0
Barclay Plager	D	11	1	4	5	21	1	0	1
Bob Plager	D	11	1	4	5	5	0	0	0
Terry Crisp	C	11	1	3	4	2	0	0	0
Kevin O'Shea	RW	11	2	1	3	10	0	0	1
Larry Hornung	D	11	0	2	2	2	0	0	0
Danny O'Shea	C	10	0	2	2	36	0	0	0
Andre Dupont	D	11	1	0	1	20	0	0	0
Chris Evans	D	7	1	0	1	4	0	0	0
Curt Bennett	LW	10	0	0	0	12	0	0	0
Jacques Caron	G	9	0	0	0	2	0	0	0
Brian Lavender	LW	3	0	0	0	2	0	0	0
Peter McDuffe	G	1	0	0	0	0	0	0	0
Gerry Odrowski	D	11	0	0	0	8	0	0	0
Bill Plager	D	11	0	0	0	12	0	0	0
Ernie Wakely	G	3	0	0	0	0	0	0	0

Goaltending

Player	MIN	GP	W	L	GA	GAA	SO
Jacques Caron	499	9	4	5	26	3.13	0
Peter McDuffe	60	1	0	1	7	7.00	0
Ernie Wakely	113	3	0	1	13	6.90	0
Team:	672	11	4	7	46	4.11	0

Note:

Pos = Position;GP = Games played; G = Goals; A = Assists; Pts = Points; PIM = Penalty minutes; +/- = Plus/minus; PPG = Power-play goals; SHG = Short-handed goals; GWG = Game-winning goals
Pos = Position;GP = Games played; Min, TOI = Minutes played; W = Wins; L = Losses; T,T/OT = Ties; OTL = Overtime losses; GA = Goals-against; GAA = Goals-against average; SO = Shutouts; SA = Shots against; SV = Shots saved;SV% = Save percentage;

== Draft picks ==
The 1971 NHL amateur draft was held on June 10, 1971, at the Queen Elizabeth Hotel in Montreal, Canada.

Pick #	Player	Position	Nationality	College/junior/club team
4	Gene Carr	Center	Canada	Flin Flon Bombers (WCHL)
38	John Garrett	Goaltender	Canada	Peterborough Petes (OHA)
52	Derek Harker	Defense	Canada	Edmonton Oil Kings (WCHL)
66	Wayne Gibbs	Defense	Canada	Calgary Centennials (WCHL)
80	Bernie Doan	Defense	Canada	Calgary Centennials (WCHL)
94	Dave Smith	Defense	Canada	Regina Pats (WCHL)
108	Jim Collins	Left wing	Canada	Flin Flon Bombers (WCHL)

== See also ==
- 1971–72 NHL season
