= 1971–72 Los Angeles Kings season =

National Hockey League team season

1971–72 Los Angeles Kings
- Division: 7th West
- 1971–72 record: 20–49–9
- Home record: 14–23–2
- Road record: 6–26–7
- Goals for: 206
- Goals against: 305

Team information
- General manager: Larry Regan
- Coach: Larry Regan
- Captain: Bob Pulford
- Arena: Los Angeles Forum

Team leaders
- Goals: Juha Widing (27)
- Assists: Ralph Backstrom (29); Butch Goring (29)
- Points: Juha Widing (55)
- Penalty minutes: Mike Corrigan (95)
- Wins: Gary Edwards (13)
- Goals against average: Gary Edwards (3.60)

The 1971–72 Los Angeles Kings season was the Kings' fifth season of operation in the National Hockey League (NHL). The Kings finished in last place in the West Division and did not qualify for the playoffs.

== Regular season ==
=== Final standings ===
West Division
		GP	W	L	T	GF	GA	DIFF	Pts
1	Chicago Black Hawks	78	46	17	15	256	166	+90	107
2	Minnesota North Stars	78	37	29	12	212	191	+21	86
3	St. Louis Blues	78	28	39	11	208	247	−39	67
4	Pittsburgh Penguins	78	26	38	14	220	258	−38	66
5	Philadelphia Flyers	78	26	38	14	200	236	−36	66
6	California Golden Seals	78	21	39	18	216	288	−72	60
7	Los Angeles Kings	78	20	49	9	206	305	−99	49

=== Record vs. opponents ===
==== Vs. West Division ====
1971–72 NHL records
Team	CAL	CHI	LAK	MIN	PHI	PIT	STL	Total
California	—	1–4–1	3–2–1	1–4–1	2–4	2–2–2	0–3–3	9–19–8
Chicago	4–1–1	—	5–1	5–1	3–2–1	5–0–1	6–0	28–5–3
Los Angeles	2–3–1	1–5	—	0–6	2–3–1	1–4–1	2–4	8–25–3
Minnesota	4–1–1	1–5	6–0	—	3–1–2	4–2	4–2	22–11–3
Philadelphia	4–2	2–3–1	3–2–1	1–3–2	—	2–3–1	1–2–3	13–15–8
Pittsburgh	2–2–2	0–5–1	4–1–1	2–4	3–2–1	—	3–3	14–17–5
St. Louis	3–0–3	0–6	4–2	2–4	2–1–3	3–3	—	14–16–6

==== Vs. East Division ====
1971–72 NHL records
Team	BOS	BUF	DET	MTL	NYR	TOR	VAN	Total
California	2–4	3–0–3	2–2–2	0–3–3	1–4–1	2–3–1	2–4	12–20–10
Chicago	1–4–1	3–2–1	5–0–1	1–2–3	1–2–3	4–0–2	3–2–1	18–12–12
Los Angeles	1–4–1	3–2–1	2–3–1	0–5–1	0–6	1–4–1	5–0–1	12–24–6
Minnesota	0–5–1	2–2–2	4–2	1–4–1	3–1–2	2–2–2	3–2–1	15–18–9
Philadelphia	0–6	2–2–2	2–3–1	2–3–1	0–6	2–2–2	5–1	13–23–6
Pittsburgh	1–2–3	1–2–3	2–4	1–4–1	1–3–2	2–4	4–2	12–21–9
St. Louis	1–4–1	4–1–1	3–2–1	1–4–1	1–5	2–4	2–3–1	14–23–5

== Schedule and results ==
1971–72 regular season
October

Game	Result	Date	Score	Opponent	Record
1	T	October 8, 1971	4–4	@ California Golden Seals (1971–72)	0–0–1
2	W	October 10, 1971	4–3	@ Vancouver Canucks (1971–72)	1–0–1
3	L	October 13, 1971	1–4	Pittsburgh Penguins (1971–72)	1–1–1
4	L	October 16, 1971	0–1	Philadelphia Flyers (1971–72)	1–2–1
5	L	October 17, 1971	0–4	@ Chicago Black Hawks (1971–72)	1–3–1
6	L	October 20, 1971	1–8	@ Pittsburgh Penguins (1971–72)	1–4–1
7	W	October 21, 1971	7–0	@ Philadelphia Flyers (1971–72)	2–4–1
8	L	October 23, 1971	1–3	Montreal Canadiens (1971–72)	2–5–1
9	L	October 24, 1971	3–6	Minnesota North Stars (1971–72)	2–6–1
10	L	October 27, 1971	2–3	Buffalo Sabres (1971–72)	2–7–1
11	L	October 30, 1971	1–5	Chicago Black Hawks (1971–72)	2–8–1

November

Game	Result	Date	Score	Opponent	Record
12	L	November 3, 1971	1–7	New York Rangers (1971–72)	2–9–1
13	L	November 6, 1971	2–3	Toronto Maple Leafs (1971–72)	2–10–1
14	L	November 10, 1971	1–7	@ New York Rangers (1971–72)	2–11–1
15	W	November 11, 1971	4–2	@ Buffalo Sabres (1971–72)	3–11–1
16	L	November 13, 1971	4–6	@ Pittsburgh Penguins (1971–72)	3–12–1
17	L	November 14, 1971	2–11	@ Boston Bruins (1971–72)	3–13–1
18	L	November 17, 1971	1–5	@ Toronto Maple Leafs (1971–72)	3–14–1
19	L	November 18, 1971	0–2	@ Philadelphia Flyers (1971–72)	3–15–1
20	W	November 20, 1971	3–1	Detroit Red Wings (1971–72)	4–15–1
21	L	November 23, 1971	1–3	@ St. Louis Blues (1971–72)	4–16–1
22	W	November 24, 1971	5–3	Buffalo Sabres (1971–72)	5–16–1
23	L	November 27, 1971	1–3	Minnesota North Stars (1971–72)	5–17–1

December

Game	Result	Date	Score	Opponent	Record
24	L	December 1, 1971	3–5	@ Montreal Canadiens (1971–72)	5–18–1
25	L	December 2, 1971	0–2	@ Buffalo Sabres (1971–72)	5–19–1
26	L	December 4, 1971	1–5	@ Detroit Red Wings (1971–72)	5–20–1
27	L	December 5, 1971	0–7	@ Chicago Black Hawks (1971–72)	5–21–1
28	L	December 8, 1971	3–5	Boston Bruins (1971–72)	5–22–1
29	W	December 11, 1971	4–1	St. Louis Blues (1971–72)	6–22–1
30	L	December 15, 1971	1–3	Montreal Canadiens (1971–72)	6–23–1
31	W	December 18, 1971	4–2	Detroit Red Wings (1971–72)	7–23–1
32	L	December 21, 1971	2–3	@ Minnesota North Stars (1971–72)	7–24–1
33	W	December 22, 1971	2–1	@ St. Louis Blues (1971–72)	8–24–1
34	L	December 25, 1971	1–3	California Golden Seals (1971–72)	8–25–1
35	L	December 26, 1971	3–6	@ Chicago Black Hawks (1971–72)	8–26–1
36	W	December 29, 1971	3–1	Vancouver Canucks (1971–72)	9–26–1

January

Game	Result	Date	Score	Opponent	Record
37	L	January 1, 1972	2–3	Minnesota North Stars (1971–72)	9–27–1
38	W	January 2, 1972	6–3	@ Vancouver Canucks (1971–72)	10–27–1
39	W	January 4, 1972	4–1	California Golden Seals (1971–72)	11–27–1
40	L	January 5, 1972	2–6	@ California Golden Seals (1971–72)	11–28–1
41	L	January 8, 1972	2–10	@ Montreal Canadiens (1971–72)	11–29–1
42	L	January 9, 1972	0–8	@ New York Rangers (1971–72)	11–30–1
43	T	January 12, 1972	1–1	@ Toronto Maple Leafs (1971–72)	11–30–2
44	T	January 13, 1972	1–1	@ Boston Bruins (1971–72)	11–30–3
45	L	January 15, 1972	4–7	@ Detroit Red Wings (1971–72)	11–31–3
46	T	January 16, 1972	3–3	@ Philadelphia Flyers (1971–72)	11–31–4
47	L	January 19, 1972	1–5	New York Rangers (1971–72)	11–32–4
48	W	January 22, 1972	4–2	Philadelphia Flyers (1971–72)	12–32–4
49	L	January 23, 1972	3–5	@ Minnesota North Stars (1971–72)	12–33–4
50	W	January 26, 1972	5–3	Toronto Maple Leafs (1971–72)	13–33–4
51	T	January 29, 1972	4–4	@ Detroit Red Wings (1971–72)	13–33–5
52	T	January 30, 1972	2–2	@ Buffalo Sabres (1971–72)	13–33–6

February

Game	Result	Date	Score	Opponent	Record
53	W	February 1, 1972	7–4	Chicago Black Hawks (1971–72)	14–33–6
54	T	February 3, 1972	1–1	Montreal Canadiens (1971–72)	14–33–7
55	W	February 5, 1972	8–1	Pittsburgh Penguins (1971–72)	15–33–7
56	L	February 9, 1972	1–4	@ Minnesota North Stars (1971–72)	15–34–7
57	L	February 10, 1972	1–6	@ Pittsburgh Penguins (1971–72)	15–35–7
58	L	February 12, 1972	5–6	@ Montreal Canadiens (1971–72)	15–36–7
59	L	February 13, 1972	2–4	@ New York Rangers (1971–72)	15–37–7
60	L	February 16, 1972	1–3	St. Louis Blues (1971–72)	15–38–7
61	L	February 17, 1972	4–6	New York Rangers (1971–72)	15–39–7
62	W	February 19, 1972	5–3	Vancouver Canucks (1971–72)	16–39–7
63	L	February 23, 1972	0–2	St. Louis Blues (1971–72)	16–40–7
64	L	February 26, 1972	4–5	Boston Bruins (1971–72)	16–41–7

March

Game	Result	Date	Score	Opponent	Record
65	L	March 1, 1972	4–6	Chicago Black Hawks (1971–72)	16–42–7
66	L	March 4, 1972	2–3	@ Toronto Maple Leafs (1971–72)	16–43–7
67	W	March 5, 1972	2–0	@ Boston Bruins (1971–72)	17–43–7
68	L	March 7, 1972	2–4	@ St. Louis Blues (1971–72)	17–44–7
69	L	March 9, 1972	3–5	Philadelphia Flyers (1971–72)	17–45–7
70	W	March 11, 1972	5–3	Buffalo Sabres (1971–72)	18–45–7
71	L	March 15, 1972	2–5	@ California Golden Seals (1971–72)	18–46–7
72	L	March 16, 1972	3–8	Boston Bruins (1971–72)	18–47–7
73	T	March 18, 1972	4–4	Pittsburgh Penguins (1971–72)	18–47–8
74	L	March 22, 1972	3–6	Detroit Red Wings (1971–72)	18–48–8
75	L	March 25, 1972	0–4	Toronto Maple Leafs (1971–72)	18–49–8
76	W	March 29, 1972	4–2	Vancouver Canucks (1971–72)	19–49–8
77	T	March 31, 1972	4–4	@ Vancouver Canucks (1971–72)	19–49–9

April

Game	Result	Date	Score	Opponent	Record
78	W	April 1, 1972	9–4	California Golden Seals (1971–72)	20–49–9

Legend: Win (2 points) Loss (0 points) Tie (1 point)

== Player statistics ==
Regular season
Scoring

Player	Pos	GP	G	A	Pts	PIM	+/−	PPG	SHG	GWG
Juha Widing	C	78	27	28	55	26	−36	3	0	3
Ralph Backstrom	C	76	23	29	52	22	−22	7	1	4
Butch Goring	C	74	21	29	50	2	−10	3	0	2
Bob Berry	LW	78	17	22	39	44	−23	3	0	3
Real Lemieux	LW	78	13	25	38	28	−40	2	0	0
Bob Pulford	LW	73	13	24	37	48	−25	2	1	0
Mike Corrigan	LW	56	12	22	34	95	−7	3	0	1
Gilles Marotte	D	72	10	24	34	83	−33	4	0	1
Ross Lonsberry	LW	50	9	14	23	39	−18	1	0	0
Serge Bernier	RW	26	11	11	22	12	3	1	0	1
Bill Flett	RW	45	7	12	19	18	−30	1	0	0
Harry Howell	D	77	1	17	18	53	−34	0	0	0
Jim Johnson	C	28	8	9	17	6	−1	3	2	0
Doug Barrie	D	48	3	13	16	47	−10	1	0	0
Eddie Joyal	C	44	11	3	14	17	−30	1	0	2
Bill Lesuk	LW	27	4	10	14	14	2	1	0	1
Paul Curtis	D	64	1	12	13	57	−32	0	0	0
Mike Byers	RW	28	4	5	9	11	−13	0	0	1
Lucien Grenier	RW	60	3	4	7	4	−6	1	0	0
Al McDonough	RW	31	3	2	5	8	−8	1	0	0
Jean Potvin	D	39	2	3	5	35	−39	0	0	1
Bob Woytowich	D	36	0	4	4	6	−8	0	0	0
Larry Hillman	D	22	1	2	3	11	−7	0	0	0
Dale Hoganson	D	10	1	2	3	14	−2	0	0	0
Brian Carlin	LW	5	1	0	1	0	0	0	0	0
Bill Mikkelson	D	15	0	1	1	6	−11	0	0	0
Jim Stanfield	C/RW	4	0	1	1	0	−1	0	0	0
Denis DeJordy	G	5	0	0	0	0	0	0	0	0
Gary Edwards	G	44	0	0	0	0	0	0	0	0
Billy Smith	G	5	0	0	0	5	0	0	0	0
Rogie Vachon	G	28	0	0	0	0	0	0	0	0

Goaltending

Player	MIN	GP	W	L	T	GA	GAA	SO
Gary Edwards	2503	44	13	23	5	150	3.60	2
Rogie Vachon	1586	28	6	18	3	107	4.05	0
Billy Smith	300	5	1	3	1	23	4.60	0
Denis DeJordy	291	5	0	5	0	23	4.74	0
Team:	4680	78	20	49	9	303	3.88	2

Note:

Pos = Position;GP = Games played; G = Goals; A = Assists; Pts = Points; PIM = Penalty minutes; +/- = Plus/minus; PPG = Power-play goals; SHG = Short-handed goals; GWG = Game-winning goals
Pos = Position;GP = Games played; Min, TOI = Minutes played; W = Wins; L = Losses; T,T/OT = Ties; OTL = Overtime losses; GA = Goals-against; GAA = Goals-against average; SO = Shutouts; SA = Shots against; SV = Shots saved;SV% = Save percentage;

== Transactions ==
The Kings were involved in the following transactions during the 1971–72 season.

=== Trades ===
May 1, 1971	To Los Angeles Kings Wayne Rivers	To New York Rangers Mike McMahon Jr.
June 8, 1971	To Los Angeles Kings Claude Provost	To Montreal Canadiens Cash
June 13, 1971	To Los Angeles Kings Larry Hillman	To Philadelphia Flyers Larry Mickey
November 4, 1971	To Los Angeles Kings Rogie Vachon; 1st round pick in 1975 – Tim Young	To Montreal Canadiens Denis DeJordy; Dale Hoganson; Noel Price; Doug Robinson; 1st round pick in 1975 – Pierre Mondou
December 16, 1971	To Los Angeles Kings Doug Barrie; Mike Keeler	To Buffalo Sabres Mike Byers; Larry Hillman
January 11, 1972	To Los Angeles Kings Bob Woytowich	To Pittsburgh Penguins Al McDonough
January 28, 1972	To Los Angeles Kings Jim Johnson; Bill Lesuk; Serge Bernier; Larry Brown	To Philadelphia Flyers Bill Flett; Eddie Joyal; Jean Potvin; Ross Lonsberry

=== Free agent signings ===
June 1, 1971	From University of Minnesota Duluth (NCAA) Phil Hoene

=== Waivers ===
November 3, 1971	To Boston Bruins Matt Ravlich
November 22, 1971	From Vancouver Canucks Mike Corrigan

=== Intra-league Draft ===
June 8, 1971	From Buffalo Sabres Gary Edwards

=== Reverse Draft ===
June 8, 1971	To Seattle Totems (WHL) Jack Norris
June 8, 1971	To Baltimore Clippers (AHL) Norm Armstrong
June 8, 1971	To Salt Lake Golden Eagles (WHL) Wayne Rutledge

== Draft picks ==
Los Angeles's draft picks at the 1971 NHL amateur draft held at the Queen Elizabeth Hotel in Montreal.

Round	#	Player	Nationality	College/Junior/Club team (League)
3	34	Vic Venasky	Canada	University of Denver (WCHA)
4	48	Neil Komadoski	Canada	Winnipeg Jets (WCHL)
5	62	Gary Crosby	Canada	Michigan Tech University (WCHA)
6	76	Camille LaPierre	Canada	Montreal Junior Canadiens (OHA)
7	89	Peter Harasym	Canada	Clarkson University (ECAC)
7	90	Norm Dube	Canada	Sherbrooke Castors (QMJHL)
8	103	Lorne Stamler	Canada	Michigan Tech University (WCHA)

== See also ==
- 1971–72 NHL season
