= 1971–72 Philadelphia Flyers season =

NHL hockey team season

1971–72 Philadelphia Flyers
- Division: 5th West
- 1971–72 record: 26–38–14
- Home record: 19–13–7
- Road record: 7–25–7
- Goals for: 200 (14th)
- Goals against: 236 (7th)

Team information
- General manager: Keith Allen
- Coach: Fred Shero
- Captain: Ed Van Impe
- Alternate captains: Larry Brown (Oct.–Jan.); Jean-Guy Gendron
- Arena: Spectrum
- Average attendance: 14,379
- Minor league affiliates: Richmond Robins; San Diego Gulls; Jersey Devils; Salem Rebels

Team leaders
- Goals: Bobby Clarke (35)
- Assists: Bobby Clarke (46)
- Points: Bobby Clarke (81)
- Penalty minutes: Gary Dornhoefer (183)
- Plus/minus: Bobby Clarke (+22)
- Wins: Doug Favell (18)
- Goals against average: Doug Favell (2.81)

The 1971–72 Philadelphia Flyers season was the franchise's fifth season in the National Hockey League (NHL). The Flyers missed the playoffs for the second time in three years.

== Off-season ==
The Flyers fired head coach Vic Stasiuk on May 27, 1971, after heavy criticism by Flyers players. On June 2, the Flyers hired Fred Shero to replace him. In the previous two seasons Shero had guided two teams to league championships, the Buffalo Bisons of the American Hockey League and the Omaha Knights of the Central Hockey League.

== Regular season ==
Bobby Clarke continued to progress as he led the team in goals (35), assists (46), and points (81) in 1971–72 and he became the first Flyer to win an NHL award, the Bill Masterton Memorial Trophy for perseverance, sportsmanship and dedication to hockey. However, in the season's final game, the Flyers needed a win or a tie against the second-year Buffalo Sabres to beat out the Pittsburgh Penguins for the final playoff spot. The score was tied late in the game, but with just four seconds on the clock, former Flyer Gerry Meehan took a shot from just inside the blue line that eluded Flyers goalie Doug Favell. With identical records, the playoff berth went to the Penguins because Philly lost the season series 2–3–1.

=== Season standings ===
West Division
		GP	W	L	T	GF	GA	DIFF	Pts
1	Chicago Black Hawks	78	46	17	15	256	166	+90	107
2	Minnesota North Stars	78	37	29	12	212	191	+21	86
3	St. Louis Blues	78	28	39	11	208	247	−39	67
4	Pittsburgh Penguins	78	26	38	14	220	258	−38	66
5	Philadelphia Flyers	78	26	38	14	200	236	−36	66
6	California Golden Seals	78	21	39	18	216	288	−72	60
7	Los Angeles Kings	78	20	49	9	206	305	−99	49

=== Record vs. opponents ===
==== Vs. West Division ====
1971–72 NHL records
Team	CAL	CHI	LAK	MIN	PHI	PIT	STL	Total
California	—	1–4–1	3–2–1	1–4–1	2–4	2–2–2	0–3–3	9–19–8
Chicago	4–1–1	—	5–1	5–1	3–2–1	5–0–1	6–0	28–5–3
Los Angeles	2–3–1	1–5	—	0–6	2–3–1	1–4–1	2–4	8–25–3
Minnesota	4–1–1	1–5	6–0	—	3–1–2	4–2	4–2	22–11–3
Philadelphia	4–2	2–3–1	3–2–1	1–3–2	—	2–3–1	1–2–3	13–15–8
Pittsburgh	2–2–2	0–5–1	4–1–1	2–4	3–2–1	—	3–3	14–17–5
St. Louis	3–0–3	0–6	4–2	2–4	2–1–3	3–3	—	14–16–6

==== Vs. East Division ====
1971–72 NHL records
Team	BOS	BUF	DET	MTL	NYR	TOR	VAN	Total
California	2–4	3–0–3	2–2–2	0–3–3	1–4–1	2–3–1	2–4	12–20–10
Chicago	1–4–1	3–2–1	5–0–1	1–2–3	1–2–3	4–0–2	3–2–1	18–12–12
Los Angeles	1–4–1	3–2–1	2–3–1	0–5–1	0–6	1–4–1	5–0–1	12–24–6
Minnesota	0–5–1	2–2–2	4–2	1–4–1	3–1–2	2–2–2	3–2–1	15–18–9
Philadelphia	0–6	2–2–2	2–3–1	2–3–1	0–6	2–2–2	5–1	13–23–6
Pittsburgh	1–2–3	1–2–3	2–4	1–4–1	1–3–2	2–4	4–2	12–21–9
St. Louis	1–4–1	4–1–1	3–2–1	1–4–1	1–5	2–4	2–3–1	14–23–5

== Schedule and results ==
1971–72 regular season
October: 5–4–1, 11 points (home: 3–1–0; road: 2–3–1)

Game	Date	Score	Opponent	Decision	Record	Points	Recap
1	October 9	2–3	@ Pittsburgh Penguins	Favell	0–1–0	0	L
2	October 12	2–3	@ Vancouver Canucks	Favell	0–2–0	0	L
3	October 13	5–4	@ California Golden Seals	Gamble	1–2–0	2	W
4	October 16	1–0	@ Los Angeles Kings	Favell	2–2–0	4	W
5	October 21	0–7	Los Angeles Kings	Favell	2–3–0	4	L
6	October 23	3–5	@ Toronto Maple Leafs	Gamble	2–4–0	4	L
7	October 24	2–1	Chicago Black Hawks	Favell	3–4–0	6	W
8	October 28	3–2	Vancouver Canucks	Favell	4–4–0	8	W
9	October 30	4–4	@ St. Louis Blues	Favell	4–4–1	9	T
10	October 31	5–3	Montreal Canadiens	Favell	5–4–1	11	W

November: 2–7–3, 7 points (home: 2–4–2; road: 0–3–1)

Game	Date	Score	Opponent	Decision	Record	Points	Recap
11	November 3	0–3	@ Chicago Black Hawks	Favell	5–5–1	11	L
12	November 5	2–5	@ Buffalo Sabres	Favell	5–6–1	11	L
13	November 7	0–3	Minnesota North Stars	Favell	5–7–1	11	L
14	November 11	4–3	Vancouver Canucks	Favell	6–7–1	13	W
15	November 13	3–6	Detroit Red Wings	Gamble	6–8–1	13	L
16	November 14	3–3	Toronto Maple Leafs	Favell	6–8–2	14	T
17	November 18	2–0	Los Angeles Kings	Gamble	7–8–2	16	W
18	November 20	2–2	@ Montreal Canadiens	Favell	7–8–3	17	T
19	November 21	1–1	Minnesota North Stars	Favell	7–8–4	18	T
20	November 24	1–2	Boston Bruins	Favell	7–9–4	18	L
21	November 25	2–4	@ Boston Bruins	Favell	7–10–4	18	L
22	November 28	2–4	New York Rangers	Favell	7–11–4	18	L

December: 4–7–1, 9 points (home: 4–2–1; road: 0–5–0)

Game	Date	Score	Opponent	Decision	Record	Points	Recap
23	December 2	1–1	Detroit Red Wings	Favell	7–11–5	19	T
24	December 4	1–3	@ Minnesota North Stars	Gamble	7–12–5	19	L
25	December 5	3–0	California Golden Seals	Favell	8–12–5	21	W
26	December 9	0–5	New York Rangers	Favell	8–13–5	21	L
27	December 11	3–6	@ Detroit Red Wings	Gamble	8–14–5	21	L
28	December 12	4–1	Montreal Canadiens	Favell	9–14–5	23	W
29	December 15	2–6	@ New York Rangers	Favell	9–15–5	23	L
30	December 16	5–0	Buffalo Sabres	Favell	10–15–5	25	W
31	December 19	0–4	Toronto Maple Leafs	Favell	10–16–5	25	L
32	December 25	1–5	@ Boston Bruins	Favell	10–17–5	25	L
33	December 26	6–1	Pittsburgh Penguins	Favell	11–17–5	27	W
34	December 29	1–5	@ New York Rangers	Gamble	11–18–5	27	L

January: 3–8–3, 9 points (home: 3–2–1; road: 0–6–2)

Game	Date	Score	Opponent	Decision	Record	Points	Recap
35	January 1	4–4	@ St. Louis Blues	Favell	11–18–6	28	T
36	January 2	2–6	@ Chicago Black Hawks	Favell	11–19–6	28	L
37	January 6	2–3	St. Louis Blues	Favell	11–20–6	28	L
38	January 8	2–2	@ Toronto Maple Leafs	Gamble	11–20–7	29	T
39	January 9	10–3	California Golden Seals	Favell	12–20–7	31	W
40	January 11	0–5	@ Detroit Red Wings	Favell	12–21–7	31	L
41	January 15	2–4	@ Pittsburgh Penguins	Favell	12–22–7	31	L
42	January 16	3–3	Los Angeles Kings	Favell	12–22–8	32	T
43	January 20	3–2	Chicago Black Hawks	Gamble	13–22–8	34	W
44	January 22	2–4	@ Los Angeles Kings	Gamble	13–23–8	34	L
45	January 23	1–3	@ California Golden Seals	Gamble	13–24–8	34	L
46	January 27	2–4	@ Boston Bruins	Gamble	13–25–8	34	L
47	January 29	2–4	Boston Bruins	Favell	13–26–8	34	L
48	January 30	4–0	Pittsburgh Penguins	Gamble	14–26–8	36	W

February: 5–6–3, 13 points (home: 2–1–1; road: 3–5–2)

Game	Date	Score	Opponent	Decision	Record	Points	Recap
49	February 3	5–4	Detroit Red Wings	Gamble	15–26–8	38	W
50	February 5	3–1	@ Toronto Maple Leafs	Gamble	16–26–8	40	W
51	February 6	2–2	St. Louis Blues	Gamble	16–26–9	41	T
52	February 8	3–1	@ Vancouver Canucks	Gamble	17–26–9	43	W
53	February 9	2–3	@ California Golden Seals	Favell	17–27–9	43	L
54	February 12	1–5	@ Minnesota North Stars	McLeod	17–28–9	43	L
55	February 13	4–4	@ Buffalo Sabres	McLeod	17–28–10	44	T
56	February 16	3–3	@ Chicago Black Hawks	Taylor	17–28–11	45	T
57	February 17	1–4	Boston Bruins	Favell	17–29–11	45	L
58	February 19	1–3	@ Montreal Canadiens	Favell	17–30–11	45	L
59	February 20	3–1	Toronto Maple Leafs	Taylor	18–30–11	47	W
60	February 23	3–4	@ New York Rangers	Favell	18–31–11	47	L
61	February 26	2–5	@ Pittsburgh Penguins	Taylor	18–32–11	47	L
62	February 27	3–1	@ Detroit Red Wings	Favell	19–32–11	49	W

March: 7–5–2, 16 points (home: 5–3–1; road: 2–2–1)

Game	Date	Score	Opponent	Decision	Record	Points	Recap
63	March 2	3–0	Minnesota North Stars	Favell	20–32–11	51	W
64	March 4	6–2	St. Louis Blues	Favell	21–32–11	53	W
65	March 5	0–4	Montreal Canadiens	Taylor	21–33–11	53	L
66	March 8	6–5	@ Vancouver Canucks	Favell	22–33–11	55	W
67	March 9	5–3	@ Los Angeles Kings	Favell	23–33–11	57	W
68	March 11	2–4	@ St. Louis Blues	Favell	23–34–11	57	L
69	March 13	1–2	@ Montreal Canadiens	Favell	23–35–11	57	L
70	March 16	3–3	Buffalo Sabres	Taylor	23–35–12	58	T
71	March 18	3–5	New York Rangers	McLeod	23–36–12	58	L
72	March 23	2–4	Chicago Black Hawks	McLeod	23–37–12	58	L
73	March 25	3–0	California Golden Seals	Favell	24–37–12	60	W
74	March 26	4–1	Vancouver Canucks	Favell	25–37–12	62	W
75	March 28	2–2	@ Minnesota North Stars	Favell	25–37–13	63	T
76	March 30	3–1	Buffalo Sabres	Favell	26–37–13	65	W

April: 0–1–1, 1 points (home: 0–0–1; road: 0–1–0)

Game	Date	Score	Opponent	Decision	Record	Points	Recap
77	April 1	4–4	Pittsburgh Penguins	Favell	26–37–14	66	T
78	April 2	2–3	@ Buffalo Sabres	Favell	26–38–14	66	L

Legend: W Win (2 points) L Loss (0 points) T Tie (1 point)

== Player statistics ==
=== Scoring ===
- Position abbreviations: C = Center; D = Defense; G = Goaltender; LW = Left wing; RW = Right wing
- † = Joined team via a transaction (e.g., trade, waivers, signing) during the season. Stats reflect time with the Flyers only.
- ‡ = Left team via a transaction (e.g., trade, waivers, release) during the season. Stats reflect time with the Flyers only.

No.	Player	Pos	Regular season					
No.	Player	Pos	GP	G	A	Pts	+/-	PIM
16	Bobby Clarke	C	78	35	46	81	22	87
12	Gary Dornhoefer	RW	75	17	32	49	−15	183
17	Simon Nolet	RW	67	23	20	43	6	22
22	Rick Foley†	D	58	11	25	36	−16	168
9	Bob Kelly	LW	78	14	15	29	16	157
20	Jim Johnson‡	C	46	13	15	28	−21	12
21	Serge Bernier‡	C	44	12	11	23	−20	51
10 (Note: Clement wore number 15 through January 16.)	Bill Clement	C	49	9	14	23	−14	39
5	Brent Hughes	D	63	2	20	22	6	35
21	Bill Flett†	RW	31	11	10	21	5	26
4	Barry Ashbee	D	73	6	14	20	2	75
11	Jean-Guy Gendron	LW	56	6	13	19	−2	36
25	Jean Potvin†	D	29	3	12	15	−6	6
18	Ross Lonsberry†	LW	32	7	7	14	−9	22
7	Michel Parizeau†	LW	37	2	12	14	−6	10
18	Bill Lesuk‡	LW	45	7	6	13	−14	31
2	Ed Van Impe	D	73	4	9	13	−8	78
8	Lew Morrison	LW	58	5	5	10	−18	26
14	Joe Watson	D	65	3	7	10	−17	38
20	Eddie Joyal†	C	26	3	4	7	−13	8
24	Dick Sarrazin	RW	28	3	4	7	0	4
3	Willie Brossart	D	42	0	4	4	−7	12
19	Rick MacLeish	C	17	1	2	3	−9	9
15	Larry Mickey‡	RW	14	1	2	3	−5	8
6	Wayne Hillman	D	47	0	3	3	−16	21
23	Larry Keenan†	LW	14	1	1	2	−4	2
25	Pierre Plante	RW	24	1	0	1	−11	15
1	Doug Favell	G	54	0	1	1		32
19 (Note: Hale wore number 23 in his first four games.)	Larry Hale	D	6	0	1	1	−5	0
19	Ralph MacSweyn	D	2	0	1	1	0	0
10	Larry Wright	C	27	0	1	1	−6	2
3	Larry Brown‡	D	12	0	0	0	−3	2
23	Rene Drolet	RW	1	0	0	0	0	0
30	Bruce Gamble‡	G	24	0	0	0		2
3	Jim Mair	D	2	0	0	0	−2	0
24 (Note: McLeod wore number 30 in his first two games.)	Don McLeod	G	4	0	0	0		0
25	Don Saleski	RW	1	0	0	0	−1	0
25	Dave Schultz	LW	1	0	0	0	0	0
30	Bobby Taylor	G	6	0	0	0		0

=== Goaltending ===
No.	Player	Regular season										
No.	Player	GP	GS	W	L	T	SA	GA	GAA	SV%	SO	TOI
1	Doug Favell	54	52	18	25	9	1655	140	2.81	.915	5	2,985
30	Bruce Gamble‡	24	18	7	8	2	659	58	2.94	.912	2	1,184
30	Bobby Taylor	6	5	1	2	2	193	16	3.00	.917	0	320
24	Don McLeod	4	3	0	3	1	109	14	4.65	.872	0	181

== Awards and records ==
=== Awards ===
Type	Award/honor	Recipient	Ref
League (annual)	Bill Masterton Memorial Trophy	Bobby Clarke	
League (in-season)	NHL All-Star Game selection	Bobby Clarke	
League (in-season)	NHL All-Star Game selection	Simon Nolet	

=== Records ===
Among the team records set during the 1971–72 season was a 19-game winless streak on the road (15 losses and 4 ties) from October 23 to January 27. On October 31, Simon Nolet became the first Flyer to score three goals in a single period and four points in a single period, both franchise regular season records that have been matched but not exceeded several times, the earliest instance occurring on March 9, 1972, by Bill Flett for the goals record and Flett and Bobby Clarke for the points record. On January 9, the Flyers scored six power play goals during a game against the California Golden Seals, a mark which was later matched during the 1988–89 season.

=== Milestones ===
Milestone	Player	Date	Ref
First game	Pierre Plante	October 9, 1971	
First game	Larry Wright	October 9, 1971	
First game	Bill Clement	December 11, 1971	
First game	Don Saleski	January 11, 1972	
First game	Dave Schultz	January 20, 1972	
First game	Bobby Taylor	February 16, 1972	
First game	Rene Drolet	April 2, 1972	

=== Franchise firsts ===
Milestone	Player	Date	Ref
30-goal season	Bobby Clarke	March 13, 1972	

== Transactions ==
The Flyers were involved in the following transactions from May 19, 1971, the day after the deciding game of the 1971 Stanley Cup Final, through May 11, 1972, the day of the deciding game of the 1972 Stanley Cup Final.

=== Trades ===
Date	Details		Ref
June 13, 1971	To Philadelphia Flyers: Larry Mickey	To Los Angeles Kings: Larry Hillman	
September 8, 1971	To Philadelphia Flyers: cash	To Portland Buckaroos (WHL): Cliff Schmautz	
October 15, 1971	To Philadelphia Flyers: Rick Foley	To Chicago Black Hawks: Andre Lacroix	
November 16, 1971	To Philadelphia Flyers: Larry Keenan	To Buffalo Sabres: Larry Mickey	
January 28, 1972	To Philadelphia Flyers: Bill Flett; Eddie Joyal; Ross Lonsberry; Jean Potvin	To Los Angeles Kings: Serge Bernier; Larry Brown; Jim Johnson; Bill Lesuk	

=== Players acquired ===
Date	Player	Former team	Via	Ref
June 8, 1971	Larry Brown	New York Rangers	Intra-league draft	
June 8, 1971	Frank Spring	Boston Bruins	Intra-league draft	
June 9, 1971	Don McLeod	Detroit Red Wings	Reverse draft (Note: McLeod was claimed by the Quebec Aces, the Flyers' AHL affiliate.)	
July 1971	Orest Kindrachuk	Saskatoon Blades (WCHL)	Free agency	
September 11, 1971	Bob Hurlburt	Quebec Aces (AHL)	Free agency	
December 6, 1971	Michel Parizeau	St. Louis Blues	Waivers	

=== Players lost ===
Date	Player	New team	Via	Ref
June 8, 1971	Garry Peters	Boston Bruins	Intra-league draft	
September 20, 1971	Keith Wright		Release	
February 9, 1972	Bruce Gamble		Retirement (Note: Gamble suffered a career-ending heart attack during a game played on February 8, 1972.)	

=== Signings ===
Date	Player	Term	Ref
August 7, 1971	Pierre Plante	2-year	
August 16, 1971	Bruce Gamble		
September 2, 1971	Larry Brown		
September 2, 1971	Bob Kelly		
September 2, 1971	Rick MacLeish		
September 5, 1971	Jim Johnson		
September 5, 1971	Lew Morrison		
September 5, 1971	Joe Watson		
September 7, 1971	Gary Dornhoefer		
September 7, 1971	Wayne Hillman		
September 7, 1971	Danny Schock		
September 7, 1971	Frank Spring		
September 7, 1971	Ed Van Impe		
September 8, 1971	Serge Bernier		
September 8, 1971	Jean-Guy Gendron		
September 8, 1971	Bill Lesuk		
September 8, 1971	Larry Mickey		
September 9, 1971	Bobby Clarke	1-year	
September 9, 1971	Larry Wright	2-year	
September 10, 1971	Andre Lacroix		
September 14, 1971	Doug Favell		
March 20, 1972	Bobby Clarke	5-year extension	
N/A	Glen Irwin	2-year	
N/A	Don McCulloch	2-year	

== Draft picks ==
Philadelphia's picks at the 1971 NHL amateur draft, which was held at the Queen Elizabeth Hotel in Montreal, on June 10, 1971.

Round	Pick	Player	Position	Nationality	Team (league)	Notes
1	8	Larry Wright	Center	Canada	Regina Pats (WCHL)	
1	9	Pierre Plante	Right wing	Canada	Drummondville Rangers (QMJHL)	(Note: The Flyers acquired the 9th overall pick from the Toronto Maple Leafs along with Bruce Gamble and Mike Walton for Bernie Parent and the Flyers' second-round pick, 22nd overall, on January 31, 1971.)
3	36	Glen Irwin	Defense	Canada	Estevan Bruins (WCHL)	
4	50	Ted Scharf	Right wing	Canada	Kitchener Rangers (OHA)	
5	64	Don McCulloch	Defense	Canada	Niagara Falls Flyers (OHA)	
6	78	Yvon Bilodeau	Defense	Canada	Estevan Bruins (WCHL)	
7	92	Bobby Gerrard	Right wing	Canada	Regina Pats (WCHL)	
8	106	Jerome Mrazek	Goaltender	Canada	University of Minnesota Duluth (WCHA)	

== Farm teams ==
The Flyers were affiliated with the Richmond Robins of the AHL, the San Diego Gulls of the WHL, and the Jersey Devils and Salem Rebels of the EHL.
