= 1971–72 Buffalo Sabres season =

NHL hockey team season

1971–72 Buffalo Sabres
- Division: 6th East
- 1971–72 record: 16–43–19
- Home record: 11–19–9
- Road record: 5–24–10
- Goals for: 203
- Goals against: 228

Team information
- General manager: Punch Imlach
- Coach: Punch Imlach
- Captain: Gerry Meehan
- Alternate captains: Al Hamilton; Gilbert Perreault
- Arena: Buffalo Memorial Auditorium
- Average attendance: 15,324

Team leaders
- Goals: Rick Martin (44)
- Assists: Gilbert Perreault (48)
- Points: Tie: Perreault, Martin (74)
- Penalty minutes: Al Hamilton (105)
- Wins: Roger Crozier (13)
- Goals against average: Roger Crozier (3.51)

The 1971–72 Buffalo Sabres season was the Buffalo Sabres second season of operation in the National Hockey League (NHL). The Sabres failed to make the playoffs.

== Offseason ==
An $8.7 million (approximately $69.2 million in 2025 dollars) renovation took place after the 1970–71 inauguration of the Sabres and Buffalo Braves franchises. The arena's roof was raised 24 feet, making room for a new upper level. This raised the total capacity of the arena to over 17,000 for basketball and 15,858 for hockey, making it a more suitable home for the NBA and NHL.

== Regular season ==
For the second consecutive season the Sabres had a breakout rookie performance by their first round draft pick. Rick Martin would score 44 goals breaking the NHL rookie scoring record of 38 set the previous season by Gilbert Perreault. Despite the efforts of their young phenoms the Sabres would finish with a worse record than their inaugural season and again miss the Playoffs. During the season Eddie Shack was traded to Pittsburgh for Rene Robert.

=== Final standings ===
East Division
		GP	W	L	T	GF	GA	DIFF	Pts
1	Boston Bruins	78	54	13	11	330	204	+126	119
2	New York Rangers	78	48	17	13	317	192	+125	109
3	Montreal Canadiens	78	46	16	16	307	205	+102	108
4	Toronto Maple Leafs	78	33	31	14	209	208	+1	80
5	Detroit Red Wings	78	33	35	10	261	262	−1	76
6	Buffalo Sabres	78	16	43	19	203	289	−86	51
7	Vancouver Canucks	78	20	50	8	203	297	−94	48

=== Record vs. opponents ===
==== Vs. East Division ====
1971–72 NHL records
Team	BOS	BUF	DET	MTL	NYR	TOR	VAN	Total
Boston	—	3–1–2	5–1	2–3–1	5–1	4–1–1	6–0	25–7–4
Buffalo	1–3–2	—	0–4–2	1–4–1	0–6	1–5	2–3–1	5–25–6
Detroit	1–5	4–0–2	—	3–3	1–4–1	3–3	5–0–1	17–15–4
Montreal	3–2–1	4–1–1	3–3	—	1–3–2	4–1–1	6–0	21–10–5
New York	1–5	6–0	4–1–1	3–1–2	—	2–2–2	5–1	21–10–5
Toronto	1–4–1	5–1	3–3	1–4–1	2–2–2	—	2–2–2	14–16–6
Vancouver	0–6	3–2–1	0–5–1	0–6	1–5	2–2–2	—	6–26–4

==== Vs. West Division ====
1971–72 NHL records
Team	CAL	CHI	LAK	MIN	PHI	PIT	STL	Total
Boston	4–2	4–1–1	4–1–1	5–0–1	6–0	2–1–3	4–1–1	29–6–7
Buffalo	0–3–3	2–3–1	2–3–1	2–2–2	2–2–2	2–1–3	1–4–1	11–18–13
Detroit	2–2–2	0–5–1	3–2–1	2–4	3–2–1	4–2	2–3–1	16–20–6
Montreal	3–0–3	2–1–3	5–0–1	4–1–1	3–2–1	4–1–1	4–1–1	25–6–11
New York	4–1–1	2–1–3	6–0	1–3–2	6–0	3–1–2	5–1	27–7–8
Toronto	3–2–1	0–4–2	4–1–1	2–2–2	2–2–2	4–2	4–2	19–15–8
Vancouver	4–2	2–3–1	0–5–1	2–3–1	1–5	2–4	3–2–1	14–24–4

== Schedule and results ==
1971–72 regular season
October

Game	Result	Date	Score	Opponent	Record
1	W	October 10, 1971	2–1	Pittsburgh Penguins (1971–72)	1–0–0
2	L	October 12, 1971	1–9	@ St. Louis Blues (1971–72)	1–1–0
3	L	October 14, 1971	2–6	@ Boston Bruins (1971–72)	1–2–0
4	L	October 16, 1971	3–9	@ Montreal Canadiens (1971–72)	1–3–0
5	L	October 17, 1971	2–3	Minnesota North Stars (1971–72)	1–4–0
6	W	October 20, 1971	7–2	@ Toronto Maple Leafs (1971–72)	2–4–0
7	L	October 21, 1971	2–5	Chicago Black Hawks (1971–72)	2–5–0
8	L	October 23, 1971	1–5	@ Minnesota North Stars (1971–72)	2–6–0
9	L	October 24, 1971	2–3	St. Louis Blues (1971–72)	2–7–0
10	W	October 27, 1971	3–2	@ Los Angeles Kings (1971–72)	3–7–0
11	T	October 30, 1971	4–4	@ Vancouver Canucks (1971–72)	3–7–1
12	T	October 31, 1971	2–2	@ California Golden Seals (1971–72)	3–7–2

November

Game	Result	Date	Score	Opponent	Record
13	T	November 4, 1971	4–4	@ Detroit Red Wings (1971–72)	3–7–3
14	W	November 5, 1971	5–2	Philadelphia Flyers (1971–72)	4–7–3
15	T	November 7, 1971	3–3	Detroit Red Wings (1971–72)	4–7–4
16	L	November 11, 1971	2–4	Los Angeles Kings (1971–72)	4–8–4
17	L	November 13, 1971	2–5	@ New York Rangers (1971–72)	4–9–4
18	T	November 14, 1971	2–2	Montreal Canadiens (1971–72)	4–9–5
19	L	November 18, 1971	5–7	California Golden Seals (1971–72)	4–10–5
20	L	November 21, 1971	3–4	Toronto Maple Leafs (1971–72)	4–11–5
21	L	November 24, 1971	3–5	@ Los Angeles Kings (1971–72)	4–12–5
22	L	November 27, 1971	2–5	@ Vancouver Canucks (1971–72)	4–13–5
23	L	November 28, 1971	3–5	@ California Golden Seals (1971–72)	4–14–5

December

Game	Result	Date	Score	Opponent	Record
24	L	December 1, 1971	2–7	@ New York Rangers (1971–72)	4–15–5
25	W	December 2, 1971	2–0	Los Angeles Kings (1971–72)	5–15–5
26	L	December 4, 1971	1–5	@ St. Louis Blues (1971–72)	5–16–5
27	W	December 5, 1971	3–1	Minnesota North Stars (1971–72)	6–16–5
28	L	December 9, 1971	1–3	Chicago Black Hawks (1971–72)	6–17–5
29	T	December 11, 1971	3–3	@ Pittsburgh Penguins (1971–72)	6–17–6
30	L	December 12, 1971	2–4	Toronto Maple Leafs (1971–72)	6–18–6
31	L	December 15, 1971	1–2	@ Chicago Black Hawks (1971–72)	6–19–6
32	L	December 16, 1971	0–5	@ Philadelphia Flyers (1971–72)	6–20–6
33	L	December 18, 1971	1–8	@ Toronto Maple Leafs (1971–72)	6–21–6
34	W	December 19, 1971	5–1	Vancouver Canucks (1971–72)	7–21–6
35	T	December 23, 1971	4–4	Boston Bruins (1971–72)	7–21–7
36	T	December 25, 1971	4–4	@ St. Louis Blues (1971–72)	7–21–8
37	W	December 26, 1971	6–3	St. Louis Blues (1971–72)	8–21–8
38	L	December 29, 1971	3–7	Detroit Red Wings (1971–72)	8–22–8
39	T	December 31, 1971	3–3	@ Pittsburgh Penguins (1971–72)	8–22–9

January

Game	Result	Date	Score	Opponent	Record
40	T	January 2, 1972	4–4	California Golden Seals (1971–72)	8–22–10
41	L	January 6, 1972	2–5	Boston Bruins (1971–72)	8–23–10
42	L	January 9, 1972	1–2	Toronto Maple Leafs (1971–72)	8–24–10
43	L	January 13, 1972	2–5	New York Rangers (1971–72)	8–25–10
44	L	January 15, 1972	2–6	@ Montreal Canadiens (1971–72)	8–26–10
45	W	January 16, 1972	4–2	Montreal Canadiens (1971–72)	9–26–10
46	W	January 20, 1972	1–0	Vancouver Canucks (1971–72)	10–26–10
47	L	January 22, 1972	2–3	@ Detroit Red Wings (1971–72)	10–27–10
48	T	January 23, 1972	3–3	@ Boston Bruins (1971–72)	10–27–11
49	L	January 26, 1972	1–5	@ New York Rangers (1971–72)	10–28–11
50	L	January 27, 1972	1–3	Detroit Red Wings (1971–72)	10–29–11
51	T	January 30, 1972	2–2	Los Angeles Kings (1971–72)	10–29–12

February

Game	Result	Date	Score	Opponent	Record
52	L	February 3, 1972	2–4	New York Rangers (1971–72)	10–30–12
53	T	February 5, 1972	3–3	@ Minnesota North Stars (1971–72)	10–30–13
54	W	February 6, 1972	8–2	Boston Bruins (1971–72)	11–30–13
55	L	February 10, 1972	2–4	@ Detroit Red Wings (1971–72)	11–31–13
56	L	February 12, 1972	1–5	@ Boston Bruins (1971–72)	11–32–13
57	T	February 13, 1972	4–4	Philadelphia Flyers (1971–72)	11–32–14
58	L	February 17, 1972	0–2	Pittsburgh Penguins (1971–72)	11–33–14
59	L	February 19, 1972	1–4	@ Toronto Maple Leafs (1971–72)	11–34–14
60	L	February 20, 1972	0–4	Montreal Canadiens (1971–72)	11–35–14
61	W	February 23, 1972	2–1	@ Chicago Black Hawks (1971–72)	12–35–14
62	W	February 24, 1972	5–3	Chicago Black Hawks (1971–72)	13–35–14
63	T	February 27, 1972	4–4	California Golden Seals (1971–72)	13–35–15

March

Game	Result	Date	Score	Opponent	Record
64	L	March 1, 1972	1–4	@ Montreal Canadiens (1971–72)	13–36–15
65	L	March 2, 1972	3–4	New York Rangers (1971–72)	13–37–15
66	L	March 5, 1972	2–6	St. Louis Blues (1971–72)	13–38–15
67	L	March 8, 1972	3–6	@ California Golden Seals (1971–72)	13–39–15
68	L	March 10, 1972	2–3	@ Vancouver Canucks (1971–72)	13–40–15
69	L	March 11, 1972	3–5	@ Los Angeles Kings (1971–72)	13–41–15
70	W	March 14, 1972	4–3	@ Minnesota North Stars (1971–72)	14–41–15
71	T	March 16, 1972	3–3	@ Philadelphia Flyers (1971–72)	14–41–16
72	L	March 17, 1972	2–6	Vancouver Canucks (1971–72)	14–42–16
73	T	March 19, 1972	3–3	@ Chicago Black Hawks (1971–72)	14–42–17
74	W	March 22, 1972	4–3	@ Pittsburgh Penguins (1971–72)	15–42–17
75	T	March 23, 1972	4–4	Minnesota North Stars (1971–72)	15–42–18
76	T	March 26, 1972	2–2	Pittsburgh Penguins (1971–72)	15–42–19
77	L	March 30, 1972	1–3	@ Philadelphia Flyers (1971–72)	15–43–19

April

Game	Result	Date	Score	Opponent	Record
78	W	April 2, 1972	3–2	Philadelphia Flyers (1971–72)	16–43–19

Legend: Win (2 points) Loss (0 points) Tie (1 point)

== Player statistics ==
=== Regular season ===
Scoring

Player	GP	G	A	Pts	PIM	+/-	PPG	SHG	GWG
Rick Martin	73	44	30	74	36	−38	19	0	5
Gilbert Perreault	76	26	48	74	24	−40	11	0	1
Gerry Meehan	77	19	27	46	12	−28	4	0	2
Al Hamilton	76	4	30	34	105	−12	1	0	1
Eddie Shack	50	11	14	25	34	−11	4	0	0
Steve Atkinson	67	14	10	24	26	−22	3	0	0
Jim Lorentz	33	10	14	24	12	−11	2	0	1
Chris Evans	61	6	18	24	98	−20	2	0	0
Phil Goyette	37	3	21	24	14	−10	3	0	0
Don Luce	78	11	8	19	38	−18	0	0	1
Danny Lawson	78	10	6	16	15	−23	0	1	0
Mike Byers	46	9	7	16	12	−20	3	0	1
Craig Ramsay	57	6	10	16	0	5	0	0	2
Kevin O'Shea	52	6	9	15	44	−19	0	0	0
Mike Robitaille	31	2	10	12	22	−14	1	0	0
Larry Hillman	43	1	11	12	58	−21	0	0	0
Tracy Pratt	27	0	10	10	52	0	0	0	0
Rene Robert	12	6	3	9	2	−5	3	0	0
Jim Watson	66	2	6	8	101	−33	1	0	0
Randy Wyrozub	34	3	4	7	0	−2	0	0	0
Doug Barrie	27	2	5	7	45	−21	0	0	1
Dick Duff	8	2	2	4	0	−2	0	0	0
Ron Anderson	37	0	4	4	19	−10	0	0	0
Rod Zaine	24	2	1	3	4	−14	0	0	1
Ray McKay	39	0	3	3	18	−12	0	0	0
Larry Keenan	14	2	0	2	2	−3	0	0	0
Butch Deadmarsh	12	1	1	2	4	−10	0	0	0
John Gould	2	1	0	1	0	−1	0	0	0
Terry Ball	10	0	1	1	6	−7	0	0	0
Larry Mickey	4	0	1	1	0	−1	0	0	0
Floyd Smith	6	0	1	1	2	−3	0	0	0
Roger Crozier	63	0	0	0	10	0	0	0	0
Dave Dryden	20	0	0	0	0	0	0	0	0
Paul Terbenche	9	0	0	0	2	−13	0	0	0

Goaltending

Player	MIN	GP	W	L	T	GA	GAA	SO
Roger Crozier	3654	63	13	34	14	214	3.51	2
Dave Dryden	1026	20	3	9	5	68	3.98	0
Team:	4680	78	16	43	19	282	3.62	2

== Awards and records ==
The Sabres were not awarded any individual or team awards in the 1971–72 season.

== Transactions ==
Date	Details
May 25, 1971	To Detroit Red Wings Joe Daley	To Buffalo Sabres Don Luce; Mike Robitaille
November 16, 1971	To Philadelphia Flyers Larry Keenan	To Buffalo Sabres Larry Mickey
December 16, 1971	To Los Angeles Kings Doug Barrie; Mike Keeler	To Buffalo Sabres Mike Byers; Larry Hillman
January 14, 1972	To New York Rangers 2nd-round pick in 1972 (Larry Sacharuk)	Buffalo Sabres Jim Lorentz
March 4, 1972	To Pittsburgh Penguins Eddie Shack	To Buffalo Sabres René Robert
March 5, 1972	To St. Louis Blues Chris Evans	To Buffalo Sabres George Morrison; 2nd-round pick in 1972 (Larry Carriere)
March 5, 1972	To New York Rangers Phil Goyette (Negotiating Rights)	To Buffalo Sabres Cash

=== Intra-League Draft ===
June 8, 1971	From Chicago Blackhawks Ray McKay
June 8, 1971	To Toronto Maple Leafs Don Marshall
June 8, 1971	From Toronto Maple Leafs Rene Robert
June 8, 1971	From Montreal Canadiens Hugh Harris
June 8, 1971	To Pittsburgh Penguins Rene Robert
June 8, 1971	From Minnesota North Stars Danny Lawson
June 8, 1971	From Pittsburgh Penguins Rod Zaine
June 8, 1971	From Detroit Red Wings Tom Miller
June 8, 1971	From Toronto Maple Leafs Ken Murray
June 8, 1971	To Los Angeles Kings Gary Edwards

=== Reverse Draft ===
June 7, 1971	To Providence Reds (AHL) Brian Perry

=== Free Agency ===
August 1971	Signed John Gould
September 1971	Signed Rick Dudley
September 29, 1971	Signed Gary Bromley

=== Lost via retirement ===
Player
Jean-Guy Talbot

== Draft picks ==
=== NHL draft ===
Round	#	Player	Nationality	College/Junior/Club team
1	5	Rick Martin	Canada	Montreal Junior Canadiens (OHA)
2	19	Craig Ramsay	Canada	Peterborough Petes (OHA)
3	33	Bill Hajt	Canada	Saskatoon Blades (WCHL)
4	47	Bob Richer	Canada	Trois-Rivières Ducs (QMJHL)
5	61	Steve Warr	Canada	Clarkson University (ECAC)
6	75	Pierre Duguay	Canada	Quebec Remparts (QMJHL)

== Farm teams ==
The Sabres terminated their relationship with the Salt Lake Golden Eagles of the Western Hockey League after one season, and applied to the American Hockey League for an expansion team. The Sabres initially wanted to place the team in Dania Beach, Florida but the league refused, so they instead placed it in Cincinnati, Ohio, and named the team the Cincinnati Swords; Joe Crozier was named coach and general manager. In the Swords' inaugural season they would post a 30–28–18 record placing 3rd in the West Division which would secure a playoff berth. The first round brought the 2nd seed Hershey Bears who were swept. In the second round the Swords faced off against the 1st seed Baltimore Clippers losing the series 4–2.

== See also ==
- 1971–72 NHL season
