= Eddie Joyal =

Canadian ice hockey player (1940–2026)

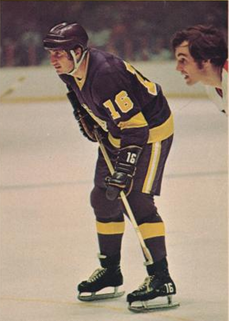
- Joyal with the Los Angeles Kings in 1971
- Born: May 8, 1940 St. Albert, Alberta, Canada
- Died: July 20, 2026 (aged 86)
- Height: 6 ft 0 in (183 cm)
- Weight: 180 lb (82 kg; 12 st 12 lb)
- Position: Centre
- Shot: Left
- Played for: Detroit Red Wings; Toronto Maple Leafs; Los Angeles Kings; Philadelphia Flyers; Alberta/Edmonton Oilers
- Playing career: 1962–1976

Edward Abel Joyal (May 8, 1940 – July 20, 2026) was a Canadian professional ice hockey centre who played in the National Hockey League (NHL) with the Detroit Red Wings, Los Angeles Kings, and Philadelphia Flyers between 1963 and 1972. He also played in the World Hockey Association (WHA) with the Alberta/Edmonton Oilers between 1972 and 1976.

== Early life ==
Born in St. Albert, Alberta, Joyal learned to play ice hockey on a frozen river downhill from his home. When healthy, he impressed with the Edmonton Oil Kings of the WCJHL. He scored 84 points in two seasons when he was restricted to 58 games due to injuries.

== Career ==
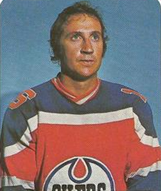
Joyal with the Edmonton Oilers in 1975

Joyal signed on with the Detroit Red Wings and began his professional career with the Edmonton Flyers of Western Hockey League from 1960 to 1961. After scoring 37 goals from 1961 to 1962, he was elevated to the Pittsburgh Hornets of the American Hockey League the next season and scored ten points in 14 games for the Detroit Red. Joyal suited up for 47 games the next year and helped the Wings reach the 1964 Stanley Cup Finals. His winning goal against Toronto Maple Leafs' Johnny Bower gave his team a 3–2 edge in a series they failed to close out. Joyal played one more season in Detroit before being traded to the Maple Leafs with whom he played 14 games from 1965 to 1966.

NHL expansion gave Joyal's career a new life. He was claimed by the Los Angeles Kings and went on to enjoy four and a half impressive years on the West Coast. He hit the 20-goal mark three times, including a career-high 33 goals from 1968 to 1969. He was traded along with Ross Lonsberry, Bill Flett and Jean Potvin from the Kings to the Philadelphia Flyers for Serge Bernier, Bill Lesuk and Jim Johnson on January 28, 1972. He was a role player with the Flyers for the rest of the season.

In 1972, Joyal joined the Alberta Oilers for the first season of the new World Hockey Association. Joyal played four seasons with his hometown team as they were renamed the Edmonton Oilers for the 1973–74 season. He scored 22 goals twice and helped his team make the playoffs from 1973 to 1974.

== Personal life and death ==
In March 2016, a new street in Joyal's hometown of St. Albert was named Joyal Way, to commemorate Joyal and his family's contributions to St. Albert. In April 2016, he was honoured with "Eddie Joyal Day" at Rexall Place, as part of the Edmonton Oilers season-long celebration for the closing of the arena.

Joyal died on July 20, 2026, at the age of 86.

== Career statistics ==
=== Regular season and playoffs ===
			Regular season					Playoffs
Season	Team	League	GP	G	A	Pts	PIM	GP	G	A	Pts	PIM
1958–59	Edmonton Oil Kings	CAHL	35	23	23	46	8	—	—	—	—	—
1958–59	Edmonton Oil Kings	M-Cup	—	—	—	—	—	4	4	1	5	0
1959–60	Edmonton Oil Kings	CAHL	23	16	22	38	10	—	—	—	—	—
1959–60	Calgary Stampeders	WHL	1	0	0	0	0	—	—	—	—	—
1959–60	Edmonton Oil Kings	M-Cup	—	—	—	—	—	22	22	14	36	10
1960–61	Edmonton Flyers	WHL	64	20	27	47	12	—	—	—	—	—
1961–62	Edmonton Flyers	WHL	70	37	32	69	14	12	10	8	18	4
1962–63	Detroit Red Wings	NHL	14	2	8	10	0	11	1	0	1	2
1962–63	Pittsburgh Hornets	AHL	54	29	27	56	6	—	—	—	—	—
1963–64	Detroit Red Wings	NHL	47	10	7	17	6	14	2	3	5	10
1963–64	Pittsburgh Hornets	AHL	5	3	3	6	6	—	—	—	—	—
1964–65	Detroit Red Wings	NHL	46	8	14	22	4	7	1	1	2	4
1964–65	Pittsburgh Hornets	AHL	6	5	3	8	0	—	—	—	—	—
1965–66	Toronto Maple Leafs	NHL	14	0	2	2	2	—	—	—	—	—
1965–66	Rochester Americans	AHL	9	9	1	10	6	—	—	—	—	—
1965–66	Tulsa Oilers	CHL	41	32	25	57	38	11	2	5	7	2
1966–67	Rochester Americans	AHL	70	32	51	83	10	13	10	3	13	4
1967–68	Los Angeles Kings	NHL	74	23	34	57	20	7	4	1	5	2
1968–69	Los Angeles Kings	NHL	73	33	19	52	24	11	3	3	6	0
1969–70	Los Angeles Kings	NHL	59	18	22	40	8	—	—	—	—	—
1970–71	Los Angeles Kings	NHL	69	20	21	41	14	—	—	—	—	—
1971–72	Los Angeles Kings	NHL	44	11	3	14	17	—	—	—	—	—
1971–72	Philadelphia Flyers	NHL	26	3	4	7	8	—	—	—	—	—
1972–73	Alberta Oilers	WHA	71	22	16	38	16	—	—	—	—	—
1973–74	Edmonton Oilers	WHA	45	8	10	18	2	5	2	0	2	4
1974–75	Edmonton Oilers	WHA	78	22	25	47	2	—	—	—	—	—
1975–76	Edmonton Oilers	WHA	45	5	4	9	6	—	—	—	—	—
WHA totals			239	57	55	112	26	5	2	0	2	4
NHL totals			465	128	134	262	103	50	11	8	19	18
