= Jean Potvin =

Canadian ice hockey player (1949–2022)

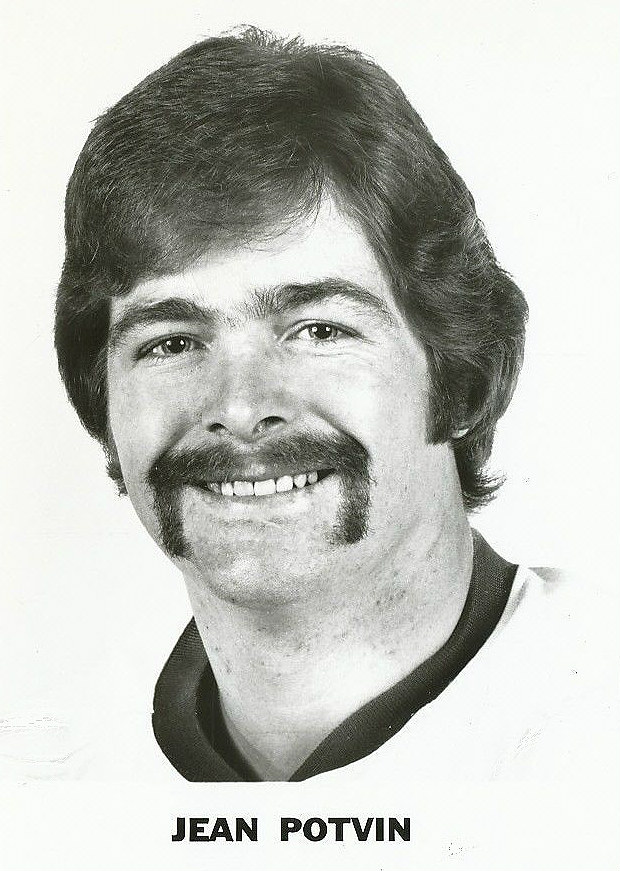
- Potvin in 1973
- Born: March 25, 1949 Ottawa, Ontario, Canada
- Died: March 15, 2022 (aged 72) Weston, Florida, U.S.
- Height: 5 ft 11 in (180 cm)
- Weight: 188 lb (85 kg; 13 st 6 lb)
- Position: Defence
- Shot: Right
- Played for: Los Angeles Kings; Philadelphia Flyers; New York Islanders; Cleveland Barons; Minnesota North Stars
- NHL draft: Undrafted
- Playing career: 1969–1981

Jean René Potvin (March 25, 1949 – March 15, 2022) was a Canadian professional ice hockey defenceman who played eleven seasons in the National Hockey League (NHL). He played for the Los Angeles Kings, Philadelphia Flyers, New York Islanders, Cleveland Barons, and Minnesota North Stars from 1970 to 1981. He was the older brother of Denis Potvin and cousin of Marc Potvin.

== Early life ==
Potvin was born in Ottawa on March 25, 1949. His father, Armand, worked as a civil servant; his mother, Lucille (St-Louis), was a housewife and a caterer. He began his junior career in 1967–68 with the Ottawa 67's of the Ontario Hockey Association, alongside his brother Denis.

== Playing career ==
Potvin began his professional hockey career in December 1969 with the Springfield Kings in the American Hockey League (AHL). The next season in 1970–71, he led all defencemen on the team in scoring as he played on the Springfield Kings' Calder Cup-winning team with teammates Butch Goring and Billy Smith. During that playoff season, Potvin scored two goals and had 10 assists for 12 points in 12 games. A decade later, Goring, Smith, and Potvin would be teammates again on the first two New York Islanders' Stanley Cup-winning teams, in 1980 and 1981.

He was traded along with Ross Lonsberry, Bill Flett and Eddie Joyal from the Kings to the Flyers for Serge Bernier, Bill Lesuk and Jim Johnson on January 28, 1972.

During his 11-year career, Potvin scored 63 goals and had 224 assists in 613 career NHL games. He led the league in games played with 78 in 1973–74. Two seasons later, he was the second-highest-scoring defenceman in the NHL with 72 points (17 goals and 55 assists). The only other defenceman to have more points that season was his brother Denis, with 98 points (31 goals and 67 assists).

On January 22, 1976, in a game against the Detroit Red Wings at Nassau Coliseum, Potvin scored three goals and also added an assist, while his brother Denis had two goals and two assists of his own. Two of Jean's goals came on the power play, with his final two goals coming 45 seconds apart. Potvin's hat trick is the only one by an Islanders defenceman not had by Denis.

Potvin was involved in the last Christmas Day fight in NHL history. Potvin, who played for the Los Angeles Kings at the time, fought Ernie Hicke of the California Golden Seals on December 25, 1971. Both players were charged with 5 penalty minutes. Potvin and Hicke were later teammates on the Islanders from 1973 to 1975.

== Broadcasting career ==
Potvin worked on Islander radio broadcasts both late in his playing career and following his retirement, when he was paired mainly with Barry Landers. Potvin won the Stanley Cup in 1980 with the Islanders in spite of spending the entire playoff run in the announcer's booth serving as color commentator with radio play-by-play man Bob Lawrence. In 1981 he played only 18 games for the Islanders. His name was still engraved on the Cup in 1981, even though he did not qualify. Again, he spent the playoffs serving as color commentator with Landers. When his playing career ended after the 1981 season, Potvin worked as the radio color commentator for the New York Islanders' broadcasts for the next eight years.

== Personal life ==
Potvin was married to Lorraine until his death. Together, they had three children: Kim, Leslie, and Justin.

Potvin was recruited by Donaldson, Lufkin & Jenrette as an institutional salesman in 1990. Over the course of the next 23 years, he worked for quality institutional firms including First Albany, Oppenheimer & Company, and Morgan Keegan & Company. Actively involved with different charities over the years, Potvin was also on the board of directors of the Boy Scouts of America in Nassau County for over a decade. In January 2014, Potvin accepted a position with Catholic Charities of Brooklyn and Queens, becoming the senior vice president for giving.

Potvin died on March 15, 2022, at a hospital in Weston, Florida. He was 72 years old.

== Career statistics ==
=== Regular season and playoffs ===
| | | | Regular season | | | | | Playoffs |
| Season | Team | League | GP | G | A | Pts | PIM | GP | G | A | Pts | PIM |
|---|---|---|---|---|---|---|---|---|---|---|---|---|
| 1966–67 | Hull Volants | QJHL | 45 | 22 | 27 | 49 | 115 | — | — | — | — | — |
| 1967–68 | Ottawa 67's | OHA | 54 | 18 | 17 | 35 | 138 | — | — | — | — | — |
| 1968–69 | Ottawa 67's | OHA | 54 | 17 | 23 | 40 | 116 | 7 | 1 | 7 | 8 | 20 |
| 1969–70 | Springfield Indians | AHL | 61 | 3 | 5 | 8 | 42 | 14 | 0 | 2 | 2 | 24 |
| 1970–71 | Los Angeles Kings | NHL | 4 | 1 | 3 | 4 | 2 | — | — | — | — | — |
| 1970–71 | Springfield Indians | AHL | 60 | 9 | 23 | 32 | 94 | 12 | 2 | 10 | 12 | 17 |
| 1971–72 | Los Angeles Kings | NHL | 39 | 2 | 3 | 5 | 35 | — | — | — | — | — |
| 1971–72 | Philadelphia Flyers | NHL | 29 | 3 | 12 | 15 | 6 | — | — | — | — | — |
| 1972–73 | Philadelphia Flyers | NHL | 35 | 3 | 9 | 12 | 10 | — | — | — | — | — |
| 1972–73 | New York Islanders | NHL | 10 | 0 | 3 | 3 | 12 | — | — | — | — | — |
| 1973–74 | New York Islanders | NHL | 78 | 5 | 23 | 28 | 100 | — | — | — | — | — |
| 1974–75 | New York Islanders | NHL | 73 | 9 | 24 | 33 | 59 | 15 | 2 | 4 | 6 | 9 |
| 1975–76 | New York Islanders | NHL | 78 | 17 | 55 | 72 | 74 | 13 | 0 | 1 | 1 | 2 |
| 1976–77 | New York Islanders | NHL | 79 | 10 | 36 | 46 | 26 | 11 | 0 | 4 | 4 | 6 |
| 1977–78 | New York Islanders | NHL | 34 | 1 | 10 | 11 | 8 | — | — | — | — | — |
| 1977–78 | Cleveland Barons | NHL | 40 | 3 | 14 | 17 | 30 | — | — | — | — | — |
| 1978–79 | Minnesota North Stars | NHL | 64 | 5 | 16 | 21 | 65 | — | — | — | — | — |
| 1978–79 | Oklahoma City Stars | CHL | 9 | 3 | 7 | 10 | 10 | — | — | — | — | — |
| 1979–80 | New York Islanders | NHL | 32 | 2 | 13 | 15 | 26 | — | — | — | — | — |
| 1980–81 | New York Islanders | NHL | 18 | 2 | 3 | 5 | 25 | — | — | — | — | — |
| NHL totals | | | 613 | 63 | 224 | 287 | 478 | 39 | 2 | 9 | 11 | 17 |

== See also ==
- Notable families in the NHL
