= Jim Johnson (ice hockey, born 1942) =

Canadian ice hockey player (1942–2021)

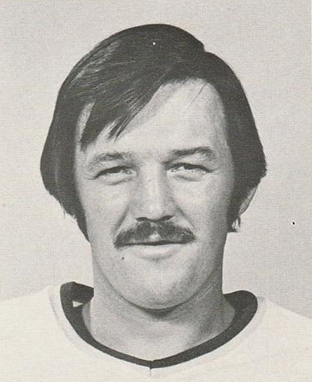
- Born: November 7, 1942 Winnipeg, Manitoba, Canada
- Died: May 4, 2021 (aged 78) Winnipeg, Manitoba, Canada
- Height: 5 ft 9 in (175 cm)
- Weight: 185 lb (84 kg; 13 st 3 lb)
- Position: Centre
- Shot: Left
- Played for: New York Rangers; Philadelphia Flyers; Los Angeles Kings; Minnesota Fighting Saints; Indianapolis Racers
- Playing career: 1963–1975

Norman James Johnson (November 7, 1942 – May 4, 2021) was a Canadian professional ice hockey centre. He played eight seasons in the National Hockey League (NHL) with the New York Rangers, Philadelphia Flyers, and Los Angeles Kings from 1964 to 1972. He went on to play three seasons in the World Hockey Association (WHA) with the Minnesota Fighting Saints and Indianapolis Racers from 1972 to 1975.

== Early life ==
Johnson was born in Winnipeg, Manitoba, on November 7, 1942. He played three seasons for the Winnipeg Rangers of the Manitoba Junior Hockey League from 1959 to 1961, before joining the Sudbury Wolves of the Eastern Professional Hockey League the following season.

== Professional career ==
Johnson was signed by the New York Rangers during the 1963–64 season and played for the St. Paul Rangers, their minor league affiliate, until the latter part of 1964–65, when he made his NHL debut. That turned out to be the only NHL game he would play in that year. He played in only seven games over the next two seasons, scoring one goal. He was subsequently drafted by the Philadelphia Flyers with the 75th selection of the 1967 NHL Expansion Draft.

Johnson scored the first goal in Flyers' franchise history during an exhibition game. During his first season with the team in 1967–68, he had two goals and one assist in 13 games. He played his first full NHL season the following year, amassing 44 points (including 17 goals) in 69 games. It was the first of three seasons in which Johnson scored 16 or more goals for the Flyers. He recorded career-highs in points (48) and assists (30) in 1969–70, and scored his first hat-trick on December 3, 1969, against the Los Angeles Kings. His strongest offensive performance came almost one year later on November 19, 1970, when he scored another hat-trick and had an assist against the California Golden Seals. He was traded along with Serge Bernier and Bill Lesuk from the Flyers to the Kings for Ross Lonsberry, Bill Flett, Jean Potvin and Eddie Joyal on January 28, 1972. During his final NHL season in 1971–72, Johnson scored 21 goals in 74 games for the Flyers and Kings, both numbers representing career bests.

In 1972 Johnson signed to play with the WHA Minnesota Fighting Saints. He scored the first goal in history at the Saint Paul Civic Center while playing with the Minnesota Fighting Saints. He played three seasons with the Saints, with his best year coming in 1973–74 when he recorded 54 points (including 39 assists) in 71 games. He was traded to the Indianapolis Racers in November 1974, and finished his career with the team at the end of the season.

== Later life ==
After retiring from professional hockey, Johnson operated a sporting goods store in Transcona and coached in the Manitoba Major Junior Hockey League. He was awarded the Nick Hill Trophy as coach of the year in the 1983–84 season while managing the Transcona Railers.

Johnson died on May 4, 2021, at the age of 78.

== Career statistics ==
=== Regular season and playoffs ===
| | | | Regular season | | | | | Playoffs |
| Season | Team | League | GP | G | A | Pts | PIM | GP | G | A | Pts | PIM |
|---|---|---|---|---|---|---|---|---|---|---|---|---|
| 1959–60 | Winnipeg Rangers | MJHL | 28 | 7 | 8 | 15 | 2 | 12 | 3 | 2 | 5 | 0 |
| 1960–61 | Winnipeg Rangers | MJHL | 29 | 15 | 21 | 36 | 12 | — | — | — | — | — |
| 1960–61 | Winnipeg Rangers | M-Cup | — | — | — | — | — | 12 | 4 | 5 | 9 | 8 |
| 1961–62 | Winnipeg Rangers | MJHL | 39 | 22 | 23 | 45 | 48 | 3 | 1 | 1 | 2 | 0 |
| 1962–63 | Sudbury Wolves | EPHL | 70 | 16 | 36 | 52 | 16 | 8 | 1 | 4 | 5 | 2 |
| 1963–64 | St. Paul Rangers | CPHL | 70 | 21 | 33 | 54 | 14 | 11 | 3 | 5 | 8 | 0 |
| 1964–65 | New York Rangers | NHL | 1 | 0 | 0 | 0 | 0 | — | — | — | — | — |
| 1964–65 | St. Paul Rangers | CPHL | 61 | 19 | 45 | 64 | 14 | 11 | 4 | 6 | 10 | 7 |
| 1965–66 | New York Rangers | NHL | 5 | 1 | 0 | 1 | 0 | — | — | — | — | — |
| 1965–66 | Minnesota Rangers | CPHL | 62 | 24 | 46 | 70 | 12 | 7 | 3 | 2 | 5 | 0 |
| 1966–67 | New York Rangers | NHL | 2 | 0 | 0 | 0 | 0 | — | — | — | — | — |
| 1966–67 | Omaha Knights | CPHL | 64 | 26 | 46 | 72 | 20 | 12 | 2 | 5 | 7 | 2 |
| 1967–68 | Philadelphia Flyers | NHL | 13 | 2 | 1 | 3 | 2 | — | — | — | — | — |
| 1967–68 | Quebec Aces | AHL | 59 | 27 | 45 | 72 | 14 | 15 | 5 | 8 | 13 | 10 |
| 1968–69 | Philadelphia Flyers | NHL | 69 | 17 | 27 | 44 | 20 | 3 | 0 | 0 | 0 | 2 |
| 1969–70 | Philadelphia Flyers | NHL | 72 | 18 | 30 | 48 | 17 | — | — | — | — | — |
| 1970–71 | Philadelphia Flyers | NHL | 66 | 16 | 29 | 45 | 16 | 4 | 0 | 2 | 2 | 0 |
| 1970–71 | Quebec Aces | AHL | 5 | 0 | 1 | 1 | 0 | — | — | — | — | — |
| 1971–72 | Philadelphia Flyers | NHL | 46 | 13 | 15 | 28 | 12 | — | — | — | — | — |
| 1971–72 | Los Angeles Kings | NHL | 28 | 8 | 9 | 17 | 6 | — | — | — | — | — |
| 1972–73 | Minnesota Fighting Saints | WHA | 33 | 9 | 14 | 23 | 12 | 5 | 2 | 1 | 3 | 2 |
| 1973–74 | Minnesota Fighting Saints | WHA | 71 | 15 | 39 | 54 | 30 | 11 | 1 | 4 | 5 | 4 |
| 1974–75 | Minnesota Fighting Saints | WHA | 11 | 1 | 3 | 4 | 0 | — | — | — | — | — |
| 1974–75 | Indianapolis Racers | WHA | 42 | 7 | 15 | 22 | 12 | — | — | — | — | — |
| WHA totals | | | 157 | 32 | 71 | 103 | 54 | 16 | 3 | 5 | 8 | 6 |
| NHL totals | | | 302 | 75 | 111 | 186 | 73 | 7 | 0 | 2 | 2 | 2 |

== Awards ==
- Honoured Member of the Manitoba Hockey Hall of Fame
