= Don McCulloch =

Canadian ice hockey player

- Born: March 23, 1951 (age 75) Little Current, Ontario, Canada
- Height: 6 ft 2 in (188 cm)
- Weight: 190 lb (86 kg; 13 st 8 lb)
- Position: Defence
- Shot: Left
- Played for: Vancouver Blazers
- NHL draft: 64th overall, 1971; Philadelphia Flyers
- Playing career: 1971–1975

Don McCulloch (born March 23, 1951) is a Canadian former professional ice hockey player. He played in 51 WHA games with the Vancouver Blazers during the 1974–75 season.

== Career statistics ==
=== Regular season and playoffs ===
			Regular season					Playoffs
Season	Team	League	GP	G	A	Pts	PIM	GP	G	A	Pts	PIM
1968–69	St. Catharines Black Hawks	OHA	45	1	4	5	12	––	––	––	––	––
1969–70	St. Catharines Black Hawks	OHA	53	0	20	20	49	––	––	––	––	––
1970–71	St. Catharines Black Hawks	OHA	30	3	9	12	16	––	––	––	––	––
1970–71	Niagara Falls Flyers	OHA	25	2	7	9	20
1971–72	Richmond Robins	AHL	61	5	18	23	34	––	––	––	––	––
1972–73	Richmond Robins	AHL	70	7	15	22	52	4	3	1	4	0
1973–74	Richmond Robins	AHL	72	6	33	39	56	5	0	1	1	2
1974–75	Vancouver Blazers	WHA	51	1	9	10	42	––	––	––	––	––
1974–75	Tulsa Oilers	CHL	12	1	4	5	12	––	––	––	––	––
WHA totals			51	1	9	10	42	—	—	—	—	—
