= Phil Hoene =

American ice hockey player (born 1949)

- Born: March 15, 1949 (age 77) Duluth, Minnesota, U.S.
- Height: 5 ft 9 in (175 cm)
- Weight: 190 lb (86 kg; 13 st 8 lb)
- Position: Center
- Shot: Left
- Played for: Los Angeles Kings
- NHL draft: Undrafted
- Playing career: 1971–1976

Philip George Hoene (born March 15, 1949) is an American former professional ice hockey player who played for the Los Angeles Kings in the National Hockey League.

== Career ==
Hoene played high school hockey under Coach Del Genereau at Duluth Cathedral High School from 1963 to 1967. The team won the Catholic High School State Tournament all four years. In 1967, he scored a hat trick in 37 seconds in a game against Duluth East High School, a major rival at the time. Hoene went on to play for the University of Minnesota Duluth in the WCHA from 1967 to 1971, after which he entered the professional ranks with the Los Angeles Kings.

== Career statistics ==
			Regular season					Playoffs
Season	Team	League	GP	G	A	Pts	PIM	GP	G	A	Pts	PIM
1968–69	University of Minnesota Duluth	NCAA	29	14	8	22	4	—	—	—	—	—
1969–70	University of Minnesota Duluth	NCAA	18	5	6	11	8	—	—	—	—	—
1970–71	University of Minnesota Duluth	NCAA	34	14	13	27	37	—	—	—	—	—
1971–72	Springfield Kings	AHL	65	15	11	26	17	2	0	0	0	0
1972–73	Los Angeles Kings	NHL	4	0	1	1	0	—	—	—	—	—
1972–73	Springfield Kings	AHL	70	36	44	80	17	—	—	—	—	—
1973–74	Los Angeles Kings	NHL	31	2	3	5	22	—	—	—	—	—
1973–74	Springfield Kings	AHL	42	19	23	42	20	—	—	—	—	—
1974–75	Los Angeles Kings	NHL	2	0	0	0	0	—	—	—	—	—
1974–75	Springfield Kings	AHL	70	25	30	55	10	17	12	10	22	8
1975–76	Fort Worth Texans	CHL	73	13	22	35	14	—	—	—	—	—
NHL totals			37	2	4	6	22	—	—	—	—	—
AHL totals			247	95	108	203	64	19	12	10	22	8
