= Serge Bernier =

Canadian ice hockey player (born 1947)

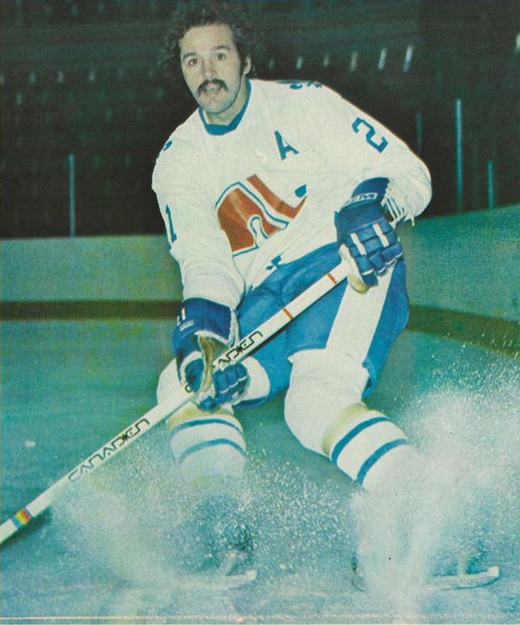
- Born: April 29, 1947 (age 79) Padoue, Quebec, Canada
- Height: 6 ft 0 in (183 cm)
- Weight: 190 lb (86 kg; 13 st 8 lb)
- Position: Right wing
- Shot: Right
- Played for: Philadelphia Flyers; Los Angeles Kings; Quebec Nordiques
- National team: Canada
- NHL draft: 5th overall, 1967; Philadelphia Flyers
- Playing career: 1967–1981

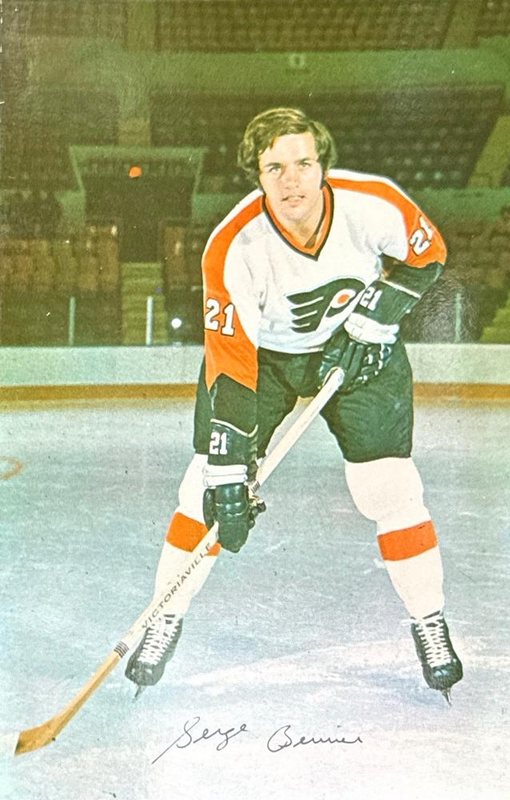
1970-71 postcard of Bernier for Philadelphia Flyers

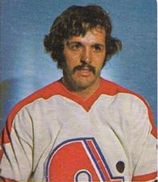
Bernier in 1975 card

Serge Joseph Bernier (burn-YAY; born April 29, 1947) is a Canadian former professional ice hockey right winger who played seven seasons in the National Hockey League (NHL) for the Philadelphia Flyers, Los Angeles Kings and Quebec Nordiques and six seasons in the World Hockey Association (WHA) for Quebec, where he scored a majority of his 308 combined goals (NHL and WHA), between 1968 and 1981. His 230 goals in the WHA were third-most for the Nordiques during their time in the league behind Real Cloutier and Marc Tardif. He was the first draft pick in Philadelphia Flyers history. He was nicknamed Toutou, which roughly translates to "Big Teddy Bear" in English.

He was traded along with Bill Lesuk and Jim Johnson from the Flyers to the Kings for Ross Lonsberry, Bill Flett, Jean Potvin and Eddie Joyal on January 28, 1972. In the 1977 WHA playoffs, Bernier led the entire postseason in points (36), assists (22) and tied in goals (14) to aid the Nordiques to the Avco World Trophy for the only time in franchise history. For his efforts, he was named WHA Playoff MVP.

In 2010, Bernier was part of the initial group of players elected to the World Hockey Association Hall of Fame.

== Career statistics ==
=== Regular season and playoffs ===
			Regular season					Playoffs
Season	Team	League	GP	G	A	Pts	PIM	GP	G	A	Pts	PIM
1965–66	Sorel Éperviers	QJHL	—	—	—	—	—	—	—	—	—	—
1966–67	Sorel Éperviers	QJHL	33	37	46	83	139	4	2	1	3	18
1967–68	Quebec Aces	AHL	33	7	11	18	56	6	6	4	10	6
1968–69	Philadelphia Flyers	NHL	1	0	0	0	2	—	—	—	—	—
1968–69	Quebec Aces	AHL	70	27	32	59	118	12	1	6	7	2
1969–70	Philadelphia Flyers	NHL	1	0	1	1	0	—	—	—	—	—
1969–70	Quebec Aces	AHL	70	22	48	70	88	5	2	3	5	36
1970–71	Philadelphia Flyers	NHL	77	23	28	51	77	4	1	1	2	0
1971–72	Philadelphia Flyers	NHL	44	12	11	23	51	—	—	—	—	—
1971–72	Los Angeles Kings	NHL	26	11	11	22	12	—	—	—	—	—
1972–73	Los Angeles Kings	NHL	75	22	46	68	43	—	—	—	—	—
1973–74	Quebec Nordiques	WHA	74	37	49	86	107	—	—	—	—	—
1974–75	Quebec Nordiques	WHA	76	54	68	122	75	15	8	8	16	6
1975–76	Quebec Nordiques	WHA	70	34	68	102	91	5	2	6	8	6
1976–77	Quebec Nordiques	WHA	74	43	53	96	94	17	14	22	36	10
1977–78	Quebec Nordiques	WHA	58	26	52	78	48	11	4	10	14	17
1978–79	Quebec Nordiques	WHA	65	36	46	82	71	1	0	0	0	2
1979–80	Quebec Nordiques	NHL	32	8	14	22	31	—	—	—	—	—
1980–81	Quebec Nordiques	NHL	46	2	8	10	18	1	0	0	0	0
WHA totals			417	230	336	556	486	49	28	46	74	41
NHL totals			302	78	119	197	234	5	1	1	2	0

=== International ===
Year	Team	Event	GP	G	A	Pts	PIM
1974	Canada	SS	8	1	2	3	4
Senior totals			8	1	2	3	4

Preceded by None	Philadelphia Flyers' first-round draft pick 1967	Succeeded by Lew Morrison
