= Ross Lonsberry =

Canadian ice hockey player (1947–2014)

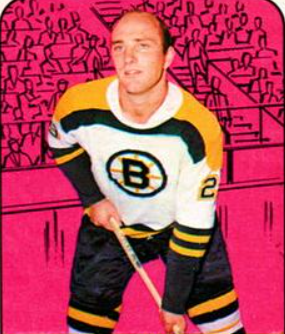
- Born: February 7, 1947 Humboldt, Saskatchewan, Canada
- Died: May 4, 2014 (aged 67) Santa Clarita, California, U.S.
- Height: 5 ft 10 in (178 cm)
- Weight: 185 lb (84 kg; 13 st 3 lb)
- Position: Left wing
- Shot: Left
- Played for: Boston Bruins; Los Angeles Kings; Philadelphia Flyers; Pittsburgh Penguins
- Playing career: 1966–1981

David Ross Lonsberry (February 7, 1947 – May 4, 2014) was a Canadian professional ice hockey left winger who played 15 seasons in the National Hockey League (NHL) for the Boston Bruins, Los Angeles Kings, Philadelphia Flyers and Pittsburgh Penguins. He had his best seasons in a Flyers uniform and was a member of Philadelphia's back-to-back Stanley Cup championship teams in the mid-1970s.

== Playing career ==
Signed with the Boston Bruins organization as a teenager, Lonsberry enjoyed an outstanding junior career with the Estevan Bruins junior club of the Saskatchewan Junior Hockey League (SJHL), winning the scoring championship in his final season with 144 points in only 60 games, and following with 23 goals in 25 playoff games en route to the Memorial Cup semifinals. Starting in 1966, Lonsberry had a three-year professional apprenticeship with the Bruins' Central Professional Hockey League farm team, the Oklahoma City Blazers, while spending some time with the NHL club in each of the three seasons.

Coveted by the Los Angeles Kings, they traded for him in 1970 for two first round draft picks, and he became a steady two-way performer for Los Angeles, scoring twenty or more goals each of his two full seasons with the Kings and being named to play in the NHL All-Star Game in 1972. He played 82 games combined in a 78-game season with the Kings and Flyers in 1971-72. He is also noted for scoring the first NHL goal at the Pacific Coliseum, then the home of the Vancouver Canucks.

He was acquired along with Bill Flett, Jean Potvin and Eddie Joyal by the Flyers from the Kings for Serge Bernier, Bill Lesuk and Jim Johnson on January 28, 1972. The transaction was the largest in league history at the time. He would meet with the most success with the Flyers. Playing on a line with Rick MacLeish and Gary Dornhoefer, his hard-nosed two-way style fit in perfectly with the "Broad Street Bullies," scoring over twenty goals in three of his six and a half seasons in Philadelphia and participating in both of the Flyers' Stanley Cup championships. His best season was 1974, the first such championship, where he had a career high 32 goals and followed with 13 points in 17 playoff games.

In 1978, Lonsberry was dealt for the final time to the Pittsburgh Penguins, remaining an effective player for his three years with that club. With Pittsburgh in a youth movement and declining to renew his contract, he retired after the 1981 season.

Lonsberry finished his career with 256 goals and 310 assists for 566 points in 968 games, adding 806 penalty minutes. He also played in 100 playoff games, scoring 21 goals and 25 assists.

After his playing career, Lonsberry went into the commercial insurance business in the Los Angeles area. He died of cancer on May 4, 2014.

== Career statistics ==
			Regular season					Playoffs
Season	Team	League	GP	G	A	Pts	PIM	GP	G	A	Pts	PIM
1962–63	Estevan Bruins	SJHL	1	0	1	1	0	—	—	—	—	—
1963–64	Estevan Bruins	SJHL	61	18	26	44	55	11	6	9	15	23
1963–64	Estevan Bruins	MC	—	—	—	—	—	5	1	1	2	8
1964–65	Estevan Bruins	SJHL	56	40	56	96	130	6	3	5	8	15
1964–65	Minneapolis Bruins	CPHL	2	0	0	0	0	5	1	0	1	4
1964–65	Estevan Bruins	MC	—	—	—	—	—	19	20	10	30	23
1965–66	Estevan Bruins	SJHL	59	67	77	144	109	12	13	6	19	26
1965–66	Estevan Bruins	MC	—	—	—	—	—	13	10	9	19	17
1965–66	Edmonton Oil Kings	MC	—	—	—	—	—	6	2	1	3	6
1966–67	Oklahoma City Blazers	CPHL	46	12	10	22	83	11	3	2	5	31
1966–67	Buffalo Bisons	AHL	7	1	1	2	4	—	—	—	—	—
1966–67	Boston Bruins	NHL	8	0	1	1	2	—	—	—	—	—
1967–68	Oklahoma City Blazers	CPHL	19	2	2	4	12	7	3	3	6	22
1967–68	Boston Bruins	NHL	19	2	2	4	12	—	—	—	—	—
1968–69	Oklahoma City Blazers	CHL	65	28	39	67	169	12	4	8	12	21
1968–69	Boston Bruins	NHL	6	0	0	0	2	—	—	—	—	—
1969–70	Los Angeles Kings	NHL	76	20	22	42	118	—	—	—	—	—
1970–71	Los Angeles Kings	NHL	76	25	28	53	80	—	—	—	—	—
1971–72	Los Angeles Kings	NHL	50	9	14	23	39	—	—	—	—	—
1971–72	Philadelphia Flyers	NHL	32	7	7	14	22	—	—	—	—	—
1972–73	Philadelphia Flyers	NHL	77	21	29	50	59	11	4	3	7	9
1973–74	Philadelphia Flyers	NHL	75	32	19	51	48	17	4	9	13	18
1974–75	Philadelphia Flyers	NHL	80	24	25	49	99	17	4	3	7	10
1975–76	Philadelphia Flyers	NHL	80	19	28	47	87	16	4	3	7	2
1976–77	Philadelphia Flyers	NHL	75	23	32	55	43	10	1	2	3	29
1977–78	Philadelphia Flyers	NHL	78	18	30	48	45	12	2	2	4	6
1978–79	Pittsburgh Penguins	NHL	80	24	22	46	38	7	0	2	2	9
1979–80	Pittsburgh Penguins	NHL	76	15	18	33	36	5	2	1	3	2
1980–81	Pittsburgh Penguins	NHL	80	17	33	50	76	5	0	0	0	2
CPHL/CHL totals			154	56	67	123	368	35	11	13	24	78
NHL totals			968	256	310	566	806	100	21	25	46	87
