= Bill Flett =

Canadian ice hockey player (1943–1999)

- Born: July 21, 1943 Vermilion, Alberta, Canada
- Died: July 12, 1999 (aged 55) Edmonton, Alberta, Canada
- Height: 6 ft 1 in (185 cm)
- Weight: 195 lb (88 kg; 13 st 13 lb)
- Position: Right wing
- Shot: Right
- Played for: Los Angeles Kings; Philadelphia Flyers; Toronto Maple Leafs; Atlanta Flames; Edmonton Oilers
- Playing career: 1963–1980

William Mayer Flett (July 21, 1943 – July 12, 1999) was a Canadian professional ice hockey player who played in the National Hockey League (NHL) for the Los Angeles Kings, Philadelphia Flyers, Toronto Maple Leafs and Atlanta Flames. Flett then moved to the World Hockey Association, playing with the Edmonton Oilers, returning to the NHL with the Oilers in the 1979–80 NHL season.

== Playing career ==
Born in Vermilion, Alberta, Flett played his minor hockey in Okotoks, Alberta, then played junior hockey with the Melville Millionaires of the SJHL. From 1963–64 through 1966–67, he played for teams in various minor professional leagues (AHL, EHL, WHL, CPHL). In 1967, when the NHL expanded from six to twelve teams, Flett was drafted by the expansion Los Angeles Kings. In his rookie season, playing on the right wing, he scored 26 goals and was named The Sporting News NHL West Division Rookie of the Year.

Flett was nicknamed "Cowboy" because in addition to being a hockey player, he owned a cattle ranch in Alberta and he was also a rodeo performer. Flett's rodeo career ended when the Los Angeles Kings owner Jack Kent Cooke threatened to fine him $1,000 ($9,300 today) for every rodeo he appeared in. He was well known throughout his career for being one of the few hockey players at the time to sport a full beard, and for being one of the last players to play without a helmet. Not known for his playmaking skill or skating, Flett did possess a booming and heavy slapshot and when paired with the right center who could get him the puck, he was among the league's biggest scoring threats.

Flett scored 24 goals in his sophomore season. His goal production declined significantly in his next two seasons. He was acquired along with Ross Lonsberry, Jean Potvin and Eddie Joyal by the Flyers from the Kings for Serge Bernier, Bill Lesuk and Jim Johnson on January 28, 1972. He had his best season in 1972–73 with 43 goals with the Flyers. Flett was a member of the Flyers 1974 Stanley Cup champion team.

He was traded from the Flyers to the Toronto Maple Leafs for Randy Osburn and Dave Fortier on May 27, 1974. He was waived by the Maple Leafs after reverting to his indifferent play. The Atlanta Flames picked him from waivers, and Flett had one last productive year in the NHL when he scored 23 goals in 1975–76. In 1976–77, the Flames sold him to the Edmonton Oilers of the WHA where he averaged over 60 points per season over the next three years. When Edmonton joined the NHL, he found he had little left and retired after 20 games. He scouted for the Oilers after that.

== Personal life ==
Flett married Doreen in 1964; they had three sons together, Cody, Dean, and Shane.

Flett lived in Edmonton after retiring from the Edmonton Oilers in 1980 and maintained friendships with his former teammates and team executives. He battled alcoholism for many years and explained, in 1997, that he had been sober for "4 or 5 years" after Oilers owner Peter Pocklington and coach Glen Sather helped him get a placement in the Betty Ford Clinic in Rancho Mirage.

In May 1999, Flett entered the hospital due to a gallbladder condition which eventually contributed to liver failure. Flett received a liver transplant, but his body rejected it; he died on July 12, 1999, due to liver failure.

== Career statistics ==
=== Regular season and playoffs ===
| | | | Regular season | | | | | Playoffs |
| Season | Team | League | GP | G | A | Pts | PIM | GP | G | A | Pts | PIM |
|---|---|---|---|---|---|---|---|---|---|---|---|---|
| 1960–61 | Melville Millionaires | SJHL | 27 | 16 | 2 | 18 | 14 | 7 | 3 | 1 | 4 | 10 |
| 1961–62 | Melville Millionaires | SJHL | 24 | 8 | 14 | 22 | 44 | — | — | — | — | — |
| 1962–63 | Melville Millionaires | SJHL | 53 | 31 | 54 | 85 | 80 | 18 | 7 | 11 | 18 | 40 |
| 1962–63 | Estevan Bruins | M-Cup | — | — | — | — | — | 6 | 1 | 1 | 2 | 2 |
| 1963–64 | Rochester Americans | AHL | 1 | 0 | 0 | 0 | 0 | — | — | — | — | — |
| 1963–64 | Charlotte Checkers | EHL | 41 | 26 | 21 | 47 | 48 | 3 | 0 | 1 | 1 | 6 |
| 1963–64 | Denver Invaders | WHL | — | — | — | — | — | 1 | 0 | 0 | 0 | 0 |
| 1964–65 | Tulsa Oilers | CPHL | 39 | 8 | 22 | 30 | 58 | 12 | 1 | 2 | 3 | 6 |
| 1964–65 | Victoria Maple Leafs | WHL | 23 | 1 | 7 | 8 | 14 | — | — | — | — | — |
| 1965–66 | Tulsa Oilers | CPHL | 55 | 23 | 23 | 46 | 83 | — | — | — | — | — |
| 1966–67 | Tulsa Oilers | CPHL | 62 | 16 | 28 | 44 | 108 | — | — | — | — | — |
| 1967–68 | Los Angeles Kings | NHL | 73 | 26 | 20 | 46 | 97 | 7 | 1 | 2 | 3 | 8 |
| 1968–69 | Los Angeles Kings | NHL | 72 | 24 | 25 | 49 | 53 | 10 | 3 | 4 | 7 | 11 |
| 1969–70 | Los Angeles Kings | NHL | 69 | 14 | 18 | 32 | 70 | — | — | — | — | — |
| 1969–70 | Springfield Kings | AHL | 5 | 2 | 6 | 8 | 6 | — | — | — | — | — |
| 1970–71 | Los Angeles Kings | NHL | 64 | 13 | 24 | 37 | 57 | — | — | — | — | — |
| 1971–72 | Los Angeles Kings | NHL | 45 | 7 | 12 | 19 | 18 | — | — | — | — | — |
| 1971–72 | Philadelphia Flyers | NHL | 31 | 11 | 10 | 21 | 26 | — | — | — | — | — |
| 1972–73 | Philadelphia Flyers | NHL | 69 | 43 | 31 | 74 | 53 | 11 | 3 | 4 | 7 | 0 |
| 1973–74 | Philadelphia Flyers | NHL | 67 | 17 | 27 | 44 | 51 | 17 | 0 | 6 | 6 | 21 |
| 1974–75 | Toronto Maple Leafs | NHL | 77 | 15 | 25 | 40 | 38 | 5 | 0 | 0 | 0 | 2 |
| 1975–76 | Atlanta Flames | NHL | 78 | 23 | 17 | 40 | 30 | 2 | 0 | 0 | 0 | 0 |
| 1976–77 | Atlanta Flames | NHL | 24 | 4 | 4 | 8 | 6 | — | — | — | — | — |
| 1976–77 | Edmonton Oilers | WHA | 48 | 34 | 20 | 54 | 20 | 5 | 0 | 2 | 2 | 2 |
| 1977–78 | Edmonton Oilers | WHA | 74 | 41 | 28 | 69 | 34 | — | — | — | — | — |
| 1978–79 | Edmonton Oilers | WHA | 73 | 28 | 36 | 64 | 14 | 10 | 5 | 2 | 7 | 2 |
| 1979–80 | Edmonton Oilers | NHL | 20 | 5 | 2 | 7 | 2 | — | — | — | — | — |
| WHA totals | | | 195 | 103 | 84 | 187 | 68 | 15 | 5 | 4 | 9 | 4 |
| NHL totals | | | 689 | 202 | 215 | 417 | 501 | 52 | 7 | 16 | 23 | 42 |
