= Bill Lesuk =

Canadian ice hockey player (born 1946)

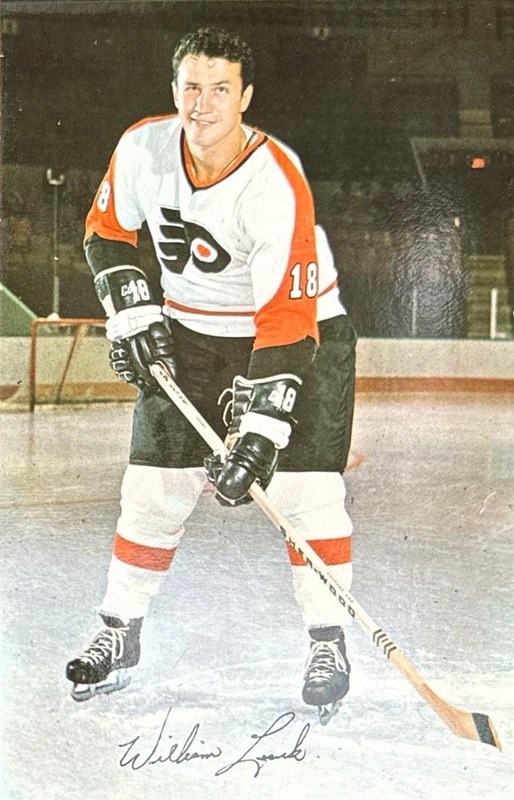
- Born: November 1, 1946 (age 79) Moose Jaw, Saskatchewan, Canada
- Height: 5 ft 8 in (173 cm)
- Weight: 180 lb (82 kg; 12 st 12 lb)
- Position: Left wing
- Shot: Left
- Played for: Boston Bruins; Philadelphia Flyers; Los Angeles Kings; Washington Capitals; Winnipeg Jets
- Playing career: 1967–1980

William Anton Lesuk (/lɛˈsuːk/ leh-SOOK; born November 1, 1946) is a Canadian former professional ice hockey left winger who played in the National Hockey League (NHL) with the Boston Bruins, Philadelphia Flyers, Los Angeles Kings, Washington Capitals, and Winnipeg Jets. He also played in the World Hockey Association (WHA) with Winnipeg. He won the Stanley Cup in 1970 with the Bruins. He was traded along with Serge Bernier and Jim Johnson from the Flyers to the Kings for Ross Lonsberry, Bill Flett, Jean Potvin and Eddie Joyal on January 28, 1972.

== Career ==
Nicknamed the tractor Lesuk, a junior with Weyburn Red Wings, he had 3 successive years with the red wings including an appearance in the memorial cup. Then the following year in 1966–67 after having a 82-point season in 56 games for the Red wings He was then drafted to the Boston Bruins. Playing for the Bruins affiliate team the Oklahoma City Blazers in 1967–68. He then spent a majority of the year with the Blazers the following year but also made 5 appearances for the Bruins as well during the 1968-69 season. The following year in 1969–70 season he played 70 games with the Hershey Bears but also made a few appearances for the Boston Bruins including 2 playoff games with the Bruins winning the 1970 Stanley cup. He then went on to play 388 total games in the NHL with the Boston Bruins Philadelphia Flyers, Los Angeles kings and Washington capitals finishing with 44 goals and 63 assists.

In 1975 he joined the Winnipeg Jets of the WHA. Being a decent offensive player but his real value was as a defensive forward. Those Jet teams had great offense, but they needed a shut-down winger like Lesuk. During his time with the team he helped them win the Avco Cup in 1976, 1978 and 1979. He would play one final year in the NHL during the 1979-80 season when the jets joined the league. after retiring, Lesuk was a scout for Boston, Chicago and Winnipeg-Phoenix. He still lives in the Winnipeg area.

== Career statistics ==
=== Regular season and playoffs ===
			Regular season					Playoffs
Season	Team	League	GP	G	A	Pts	PIM	GP	G	A	Pts	PIM
1963–64	Weyburn Red Wings	SJHL	62	12	18	30	78	8	4	2	6	18
1964–65	Weyburn Red Wings	SJHL	55	25	33	58	73	15	3	11	14	28
1965–66	Weyburn Red Wings	SJHL	60	36	40	76	111	18	6	10	16	40
1965–66	Weyburn Red Wings	M-Cup	—	—	—	—	—	4	1	0	1	4
1966–67	Weyburn Red Wings	SJHL	56	36	46	82	62	5	0	5	5	4
1967–68	Oklahoma City Blazers	CHL	67	14	10	24	53	7	3	3	6	0
1968–69	Boston Bruins	NHL	5	0	1	1	0	1	0	0	0	0
1968–69	Oklahoma City Blazers	CHL	64	17	30	47	46	12	0	4	4	8
1969–70	Boston Bruins	NHL	3	0	0	0	0	2	0	0	0	0
1969–70	Hershey Bears	AHL	70	20	20	40	82	7	5	4	9	10
1970–71	Philadelphia Flyers	NHL	78	17	19	36	81	4	1	0	1	8
1971–72	Philadelphia Flyers	NHL	45	7	6	13	31	—	—	—	—	—
1971–72	Los Angeles Kings	NHL	27	4	10	14	14	—	—	—	—	—
1972–73	Los Angeles Kings	NHL	67	6	14	20	90	—	—	—	—	—
1973–74	Los Angeles Kings	NHL	35	2	1	3	32	2	0	0	0	4
1974–75	Washington Capitals	NHL	79	8	11	19	77	—	—	—	—	—
1975–76	Winnipeg Jets	WHA	81	15	21	36	92	13	2	2	4	8
1976–77	Winnipeg Jets	WHA	78	14	27	41	85	18	2	1	3	22
1977–78	Winnipeg Jets	WHA	80	9	18	27	48	9	2	5	7	12
1978–79	Winnipeg Jets	WHA	79	17	15	32	44	10	1	3	4	6
1979–80	Winnipeg Jets	NHL	49	0	1	1	43	—	—	—	—	—
1979–80	Tulsa Oilers	CHL	9	1	2	3	0	—	—	—	—	—
WHA totals			318	55	81	136	269	50	7	11	18	48
NHL totals			388	44	63	107	368	9	1	0	1	12

== Awards ==
- CMJHL Second All-Star Team – 1967
- Stanley Cup champion —1970
- Avco Cup champion — 1976, 1978 and 1979
- Honoured Member of the Manitoba Hockey Hall of Fame
