= Larry Brown (ice hockey) =

Canadian ice hockey player

- Born: April 14, 1947 (age 78) Brandon, Manitoba, Canada
- Height: 6 ft 1 in (185 cm)
- Weight: 180 lb (82 kg; 12 st 12 lb)
- Position: Defence
- Shot: Left
- Played for: New York Rangers; Detroit Red Wings; Philadelphia Flyers; Los Angeles Kings
- Playing career: 1967–1980

Larry Wayne Brown (born April 14, 1947) is a Canadian former professional ice hockey defenceman who played in the National Hockey League (NHL) with the New York Rangers, Detroit Red Wings, Philadelphia Flyers and Los Angeles Kings.

== Career statistics ==
			Regular season					Playoffs
Season	Team	League	GP	G	A	Pts	PIM	GP	G	A	Pts	PIM
1963–64	Brandon Wheat Kings	MJHL	—	—	—	—	—	2	0	0	0	0
1964–65	Brandon Wheat Kings	SJHL	54	2	11	13	12	2	0	0	0	0
1965–66	Brandon Wheat Kings	SJHL	59	6	18	24	19	11	0	4	4	0
1966–67	Brandon Wheat Kings	SJHL	—	—	—	—	—	—	—	—	—	—
1967–68	New Haven Blades	EHL-Sr.	71	6	21	27	39	10	1	7	8	8
1968–69	Omaha Knights	CHL	69	5	14	19	14	7	4	1	5	6
1969–70	New York Rangers	NHL	15	0	3	3	8	—	—	—	—	—
1969–70	Buffalo Bisons	AHL	41	2	8	10	46	—	—	—	—	—
1970–71	Detroit Red Wings	NHL	33	1	4	5	8	—	—	—	—	—
1970–71	New York Rangers	NHL	31	1	1	2	10	11	0	1	1	0
1971–72	Philadelphia Flyers	NHL	12	0	0	0	2	—	—	—	—	—
1971–72	Richmond Robins	AHL	9	1	1	2	12	—	—	—	—	—
1972–73	Los Angeles Kings	NHL	55	0	7	7	8	—	—	—	—	—
1973–74	Los Angeles Kings	NHL	45	0	4	4	14	2	0	0	0	0
1973–74	Springfield Kings	AHL	8	0	4	4	6	—	—	—	—	—
1974–75	Los Angeles Kings	NHL	78	1	15	16	50	3	0	2	2	0
1975–76	Los Angeles Kings	NHL	74	2	5	7	33	9	0	0	0	2
1976–77	Los Angeles Kings	NHL	55	1	6	7	24	9	0	1	1	6
1976–77	Fort Worth Texans	CHL	14	0	2	2	8	—	—	—	—	—
1977–78	Los Angeles Kings	NHL	57	1	8	9	23	1	0	0	0	2
1978–79	Springfield Indians	AHL	65	3	6	9	20	—	—	—	—	—
1979–80	Cincinnati Stingers	CHL	31	0	5	5	41	—	—	—	—	—
1979–80	Houston Apollos	CHL	39	1	4	5	14	4	1	1	2	0
NHL totals			455	7	53	60	180	35	0	4	4	10

== Awards ==
- MJHL Second All-Star Team (1967)
