= Jack Egers =

Canadian ice hockey player (1949–2021)

- Born: January 28, 1949; Sudbury, Ontario, Canada
- Died: September 10, 2021 (aged 72); Woodstock, Ontario, Canada
- Height: 6 ft 1 in (185 cm)
- Weight: 175 lb (79 kg; 12 st 7 lb)
- Position: Right wing
- Shot: Left
- Played for: New York Rangers; St. Louis Blues; Washington Capitals
- NHL draft: 20th overall, 1966; New York Rangers
- Playing career: 1968–1977

John Richard Egers (January 28, 1949 – September 10, 2021) was a Canadian professional ice hockey right winger. He played in the National Hockey League with the New York Rangers, St. Louis Blues, and Washington Capitals between 1969 and 1975.

== Biography ==
Originally drafted in 1966 by the New York Rangers, Egers would also play for the St. Louis Blues and Washington Capitals. Egers was an original member of the Capitals, who claimed him in the 1974 NHL Expansion Draft. He holds the distinction of scoring the first game-winning goal for the team, on October 17, 1974, against the Chicago Black Hawks.

Egers was later a captain in the Kitchener Fire Department. He died at the age of 72 on September 10, 2021.

== Career statistics ==
=== Regular season and playoffs ===
			Regular season					Playoffs
Season	Team	League	GP	G	A	Pts	PIM	GP	G	A	Pts	PIM
1964–65	Kitchener Greenshirts	COJHL	—	—	—	—	—	—	—	—	—	—
1965–66	Kitchener Greenshirts	COJHL	—	—	—	—	—	—	—	—	—	—
1965–66	Kitchener Rangers	OHA	5	1	1	2	2	—	—	—	—	—
1966–67	Kitchener Rangers	OHA	40	18	9	27	48	9	0	0	0	6
1967–68	Kitchener Rangers	OHA	54	53	37	90	78	13	5	6	11	21
1968–69	Omaha Knights	CHL	59	28	30	58	47	7	3	4	7	7
1969–70	New York Rangers	NHL	6	3	0	3	2	5	3	1	4	10
1969–70	Omaha Knights	CHL	70	42	48	90	83	3	3	3	6	2
1970–71	New York Rangers	NHL	60	7	10	17	50	3	0	0	0	2
1971–72	New York Rangers	NHL	17	2	1	3	14	—	—	—	—	—
1971–72	St. Louis Blues	NHL	63	21	25	46	34	11	1	4	5	14
1972–73	St. Louis Blues	NHL	78	24	24	48	26	5	0	1	1	2
1973–74	St. Louis Blues	NHL	6	0	1	1	6	—	—	—	—	—
1973–74	New York Rangers	NHL	28	1	3	4	6	8	1	0	1	4
1974–75	Washington Capitals	NHL	14	3	2	5	8	—	—	—	—	—
1975–76	Washington Capitals	NHL	12	3	3	6	8	—	—	—	—	—
1975–76	Baltimore Clippers	AHL	15	4	4	8	19	—	—	—	—	—
1976–77	Brantford Alexanders	OHA Sr	30	20	19	39	55	—	—	—	—	—
NHL totals			284	64	69	133	154	32	5	6	11	32

Preceded by Jim Lorentz	CHL Leading Scorer; 1969–70	Succeeded by Pierre Jarry
