= Kevin O'Shea =

Canadian ice hockey player

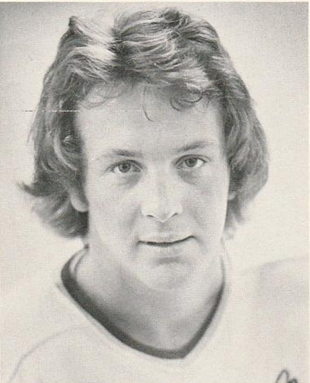
- Born: May 28, 1947 Toronto, Ontario, Canada
- Died: January 18, 2010 (aged 62) Ontario, CAN
- Height: 6 ft 2 in (188 cm)
- Weight: 205 lb (93 kg; 14 st 9 lb)
- Position: Right wing
- Shot: Right
- Played for: Buffalo Sabres; St. Louis Blues; Minnesota Fighting Saints; Timrå IK
- National team: Canada
- Playing career: 1969–1976

Kevin William O'Shea (May 28, 1947 — January 18, 2010) was a Canadian professional ice hockey forward. He played in the National Hockey League with the Buffalo Sabres and St. Louis Blues between 1970 and 1973, as well as in the World Hockey Association with the Minnesota Fighting Saints between 1974 and 1975. Prior to his professional career, O'Shea played two years for St. Lawrence University. Internationally he played for the Canadian national team at the 1969 World Championships. Kevin was the brother of Danny O'Shea, who played alongside him for a handful of seasons in the NHL and WHA.

In his NHL career, O'Shea appeared in 133 games, scoring thirteen goals and adding eighteen assists. He is best known for scoring an overtime goal in Game 7 of a playoff quarterfinal series in 1972, leading the Blues past the Minnesota North Stars and into the next round.

He played in 68 WHA games, scoring ten goals and adding ten assists. He did one season in Sweden, representing Timrå IK in Elitserien, establishing a then all-time league record in penalty minutes with 72 PIM in 33 regular season games.

O'Shea retired in 1976. He attended law school at the University of Windsor and became a practicing barrister. He died on January 18, 2010 and was buried at Stouffville Cemetery in Ontario.

== Career statistics ==
=== Regular season and playoffs ===
The O'Shea brothers in 1972

			Regular season					Playoffs
Season	Team	League	GP	G	A	Pts	PIM	GP	G	A	Pts	PIM
1963–64	Oshawa Generals	OHA	1	0	0	0	0	—	—	—	—	—
1966–67	Cornwall Colts	OHA-B	—	—	—	—	—	—	—	—	—	—
1966–67	Cornwall Royals	CJHL	—	—	—	—	—	—	—	—	—	—
1966–67	Cornwall Royals	M-Cup	—	—	—	—	—	12	6	5	11	43
1967–68	St. Lawrence University	ECAC	14	11	13	24	—	—	—	—	—	—
1968–69	St. Lawrence University	ECAC	—	—	—	—	—	—	—	—	—	—
1968–69	Ottawa Nationals	OHA Sr	6	3	1	4	32	—	—	—	—	—
1969–70	San Diego Gulls	WHL	71	12	22	34	49	6	1	2	3	9
1970–71	Buffalo Sabres	NHL	41	4	4	8	8	—	—	—	—	—
1971–72	Buffalo Sabres	NHL	52	6	9	15	44	—	—	—	—	—
1971–72	St. Louis Blues	NHL	4	0	0	0	2	11	2	1	3	10
1972–73	St. Louis Blues	NHL	36	3	5	8	31	1	0	0	0	0
1972–73	Denver Spurs	WHL	16	11	7	18	29	—	—	—	—	—
1973–74	Phoenix Roadrunners	WHL	54	24	21	45	40	9	6	5	11	0
1974–75	Minnesota Fighting Saints	WHA	68	10	10	20	42	1	0	0	0	0
1975–76	Timrå IK	SWE	33	16	5	21	72	—	—	—	—	—
WHA totals			68	10	10	20	42	1	0	0	0	0
NHL totals			133	13	18	31	85	12	2	1	3	10

=== International ===
Year	Team	Event	GP	G	A	Pts	PIM
1969	Canada	WC	7	0	0	0	23
Senior totals			7	0	0	0	23
