= 1971–72 Montreal Canadiens season =

NHL hockey team season

1971–72 Montreal Canadiens
- Division: 3rd East
- 1971–72 record: 46–16–16
- Home record: 29–3–7
- Road record: 17–13–9
- Goals for: 307
- Goals against: 205

Team information
- General manager: Sam Pollock
- Coach: Scotty Bowman
- Captain: Henri Richard
- Arena: Montreal Forum

Team leaders
- Goals: Yvan Cournoyer (47)
- Assists: Frank Mahovlich (53)
- Points: Frank Mahovlich (96)
- Penalty minutes: Pete Mahovlich (103)
- Plus/minus: J. C. Tremblay (+52)
- Wins: Ken Dryden (39)
- Goals against average: Ken Dryden (2.24)

The 1971–72 Montreal Canadiens season was the team's 63rd season of play. The Canadiens qualified for the playoffs but were eliminated in the first round.

== Regular season ==
=== Final standings ===
East Division
		GP	W	L	T	GF	GA	DIFF	Pts
1	Boston Bruins	78	54	13	11	330	204	+126	119
2	New York Rangers	78	48	17	13	317	192	+125	109
3	Montreal Canadiens	78	46	16	16	307	205	+102	108
4	Toronto Maple Leafs	78	33	31	14	209	208	+1	80
5	Detroit Red Wings	78	33	35	10	261	262	−1	76
6	Buffalo Sabres	78	16	43	19	203	289	−86	51
7	Vancouver Canucks	78	20	50	8	203	297	−94	48

=== Record vs. opponents ===
==== Vs. East Division ====
1971–72 NHL records
Team	BOS	BUF	DET	MTL	NYR	TOR	VAN	Total
Boston	—	3–1–2	5–1	2–3–1	5–1	4–1–1	6–0	25–7–4
Buffalo	1–3–2	—	0–4–2	1–4–1	0–6	1–5	2–3–1	5–25–6
Detroit	1–5	4–0–2	—	3–3	1–4–1	3–3	5–0–1	17–15–4
Montreal	3–2–1	4–1–1	3–3	—	1–3–2	4–1–1	6–0	21–10–5
New York	1–5	6–0	4–1–1	3–1–2	—	2–2–2	5–1	21–10–5
Toronto	1–4–1	5–1	3–3	1–4–1	2–2–2	—	2–2–2	14–16–6
Vancouver	0–6	3–2–1	0–5–1	0–6	1–5	2–2–2	—	6–26–4

==== Vs. West Division ====
1971–72 NHL records
Team	CAL	CHI	LAK	MIN	PHI	PIT	STL	Total
Boston	4–2	4–1–1	4–1–1	5–0–1	6–0	2–1–3	4–1–1	29–6–7
Buffalo	0–3–3	2–3–1	2–3–1	2–2–2	2–2–2	2–1–3	1–4–1	11–18–13
Detroit	2–2–2	0–5–1	3–2–1	2–4	3–2–1	4–2	2–3–1	16–20–6
Montreal	3–0–3	2–1–3	5–0–1	4–1–1	3–2–1	4–1–1	4–1–1	25–6–11
New York	4–1–1	2–1–3	6–0	1–3–2	6–0	3–1–2	5–1	27–7–8
Toronto	3–2–1	0–4–2	4–1–1	2–2–2	2–2–2	4–2	4–2	19–15–8
Vancouver	4–2	2–3–1	0–5–1	2–3–1	1–5	2–4	3–2–1	14–24–4

== Schedule and results ==
1971–72 regular season
October

Game	Result	Date	Score	Opponent	Record
1	T	October 9, 1971	4–4	New York Rangers (1971–72)	0–0–1
2	T	October 14, 1971	1–1	@ Minnesota North Stars (1971–72)	0–0–2
3	W	October 16, 1971	9–3	Buffalo Sabres (1971–72)	1–0–2
4	L	October 17, 1971	4–8	@ New York Rangers (1971–72)	1–1–2
5	W	October 20, 1971	4–2	@ California Golden Seals (1971–72)	2–1–2
6	W	October 22, 1971	6–0	@ Vancouver Canucks (1971–72)	3–1–2
7	W	October 23, 1971	3–1	@ Los Angeles Kings (1971–72)	4–1–2
8	W	October 27, 1971	5–2	Boston Bruins (1971–72)	5–1–2
9	W	October 30, 1971	3–0	Detroit Red Wings (1971–72)	6–1–2
10	L	October 31, 1971	3–5	@ Philadelphia Flyers (1971–72)	6–2–2

November

Game	Result	Date	Score	Opponent	Record
11	W	November 3, 1971	5–1	St. Louis Blues (1971–72)	7–2–2
12	W	November 6, 1971	2–1	Chicago Black Hawks (1971–72)	8–2–2
13	W	November 7, 1971	3–2	@ Boston Bruins (1971–72)	9–2–2
14	W	November 10, 1971	5–2	@ Toronto Maple Leafs (1971–72)	10–2–2
15	W	November 13, 1971	5–1	@ Minnesota North Stars (1971–72)	11–2–2
16	T	November 14, 1971	2–2	@ Buffalo Sabres (1971–72)	11–2–3
17	W	November 16, 1971	7–2	California Golden Seals (1971–72)	12–2–3
18	T	November 18, 1971	2–2	St. Louis Blues (1971–72)	12–2–4
19	T	November 20, 1971	2–2	Philadelphia Flyers (1971–72)	12–2–5
20	T	November 24, 1971	3–3	@ Chicago Black Hawks (1971–72)	12–2–6
21	W	November 27, 1971	3–1	Pittsburgh Penguins (1971–72)	13–2–6
22	L	November 28, 1971	2–4	@ Detroit Red Wings (1971–72)	13–3–6

December

Game	Result	Date	Score	Opponent	Record
23	W	December 1, 1971	5–3	Los Angeles Kings (1971–72)	14–3–6
24	W	December 4, 1971	7–0	Vancouver Canucks (1971–72)	15–3–6
25	W	December 8, 1971	4–2	Detroit Red Wings (1971–72)	16–3–6
26	W	December 11, 1971	4–3	Minnesota North Stars (1971–72)	17–3–6
27	L	December 12, 1971	1–4	@ Philadelphia Flyers (1971–72)	17–4–6
28	W	December 15, 1971	3–1	@ Los Angeles Kings (1971–72)	18–4–6
29	W	December 17, 1971	6–2	@ Vancouver Canucks (1971–72)	19–4–6
30	T	December 19, 1971	3–3	@ California Golden Seals (1971–72)	19–4–7
31	W	December 22, 1971	4–2	Toronto Maple Leafs (1971–72)	20–4–7
32	L	December 25, 1971	2–4	@ Pittsburgh Penguins (1971–72)	20–5–7
33	L	December 26, 1971	1–5	@ New York Rangers (1971–72)	20–6–7
34	W	December 29, 1971	3–2	California Golden Seals (1971–72)	21–6–7

January

Game	Result	Date	Score	Opponent	Record
35	L	January 1, 1972	2–5	@ Toronto Maple Leafs (1971–72)	21–7–7
36	L	January 2, 1972	4–6	@ Detroit Red Wings (1971–72)	21–8–7
37	W	January 5, 1972	6–4	Vancouver Canucks (1971–72)	22–8–7
38	W	January 8, 1972	10–2	Los Angeles Kings (1971–72)	23–8–7
39	L	January 9, 1972	2–5	@ Chicago Black Hawks (1971–72)	23–9–7
40	L	January 11, 1972	3–7	@ St. Louis Blues (1971–72)	23–10–7
41	W	January 13, 1972	7–1	Pittsburgh Penguins (1971–72)	24–10–7
42	W	January 15, 1972	6–2	Buffalo Sabres (1971–72)	25–10–7
43	L	January 16, 1972	2–4	@ Buffalo Sabres (1971–72)	25–11–7
44	W	January 19, 1972	1–0	Toronto Maple Leafs (1971–72)	26–11–7
45	L	January 22, 1972	5–8	Boston Bruins (1971–72)	26–12–7
46	T	January 23, 1972	3–3	@ Pittsburgh Penguins (1971–72)	26–12–8
47	L	January 27, 1972	5–6	Minnesota North Stars (1971–72)	26–13–8
48	W	January 29, 1972	4–0	St. Louis Blues (1971–72)	27–13–8

February

Game	Result	Date	Score	Opponent	Record
49	W	February 1, 1972	3–1	@ St. Louis Blues (1971–72)	28–13–8
50	T	February 3, 1972	1–1	@ Los Angeles Kings (1971–72)	28–13–9
51	T	February 4, 1972	2–2	@ California Golden Seals (1971–72)	28–13–10
52	W	February 6, 1972	4–2	@ Vancouver Canucks (1971–72)	29–13–10
53	W	February 10, 1972	7–1	Chicago Black Hawks (1971–72)	30–13–10
54	W	February 12, 1972	6–5	Los Angeles Kings (1971–72)	31–13–10
55	T	February 13, 1972	2–2	@ Boston Bruins (1971–72)	31–13–11
56	T	February 16, 1972	1–1	California Golden Seals (1971–72)	31–13–12
57	W	February 19, 1972	3–1	Philadelphia Flyers (1971–72)	32–13–12
58	W	February 20, 1972	4–0	@ Buffalo Sabres (1971–72)	33–13–12
59	L	February 22, 1972	3–7	New York Rangers (1971–72)	33–14–12
60	W	February 24, 1972	4–2	@ Minnesota North Stars (1971–72)	34–14–12
61	W	February 26, 1972	8–1	Detroit Red Wings (1971–72)	35–14–12
62	W	February 27, 1972	5–3	Pittsburgh Penguins (1971–72)	36–14–12

March

Game	Result	Date	Score	Opponent	Record
63	W	March 1, 1972	4–1	Buffalo Sabres (1971–72)	37–14–12
64	W	March 4, 1972	5–0	Vancouver Canucks (1971–72)	38–14–12
65	W	March 5, 1972	4–0	@ Philadelphia Flyers (1971–72)	39–14–12
66	W	March 8, 1972	5–4	@ Pittsburgh Penguins (1971–72)	40–14–12
67	W	March 9, 1972	5–1	@ St. Louis Blues (1971–72)	41–14–12
68	T	March 11, 1972	1–1	Chicago Black Hawks (1971–72)	41–14–13
69	W	March 13, 1972	2–1	Philadelphia Flyers (1971–72)	42–14–13
70	W	March 15, 1972	5–2	@ Toronto Maple Leafs (1971–72)	43–14–13
71	W	March 18, 1972	4–3	Minnesota North Stars (1971–72)	44–14–13
72	L	March 19, 1972	6–7	@ Detroit Red Wings (1971–72)	44–15–13
73	T	March 22, 1972	3–3	Toronto Maple Leafs (1971–72)	44–15–14
74	T	March 25, 1972	3–3	New York Rangers (1971–72)	44–15–15
75	L	March 26, 1972	4–5	@ Boston Bruins (1971–72)	44–16–15
76	T	March 29, 1972	5–5	@ Chicago Black Hawks (1971–72)	44–16–16

April

Game	Result	Date	Score	Opponent	Record
77	W	April 1, 1972	6–2	Boston Bruins (1971–72)	45–16–16
78	W	April 2, 1972	6–5	@ New York Rangers (1971–72)	46–16–16

Legend: Win (2 points) Loss (0 points) Tie (1 point)

== Playoffs ==
After winning the Stanley Cup the previous season, the Canadiens could not repeat. The Canadiens lost to the New York Rangers in the first round, losing four games to two.

== Player statistics ==
=== Regular season ===
==== Scoring ====
Player	GP	G	A	Pts	PIM	+/-	PPG	SHG	GWG
Frank Mahovlich	76	43	53	96	36	42	14	4	4
Yvan Cournoyer	73	47	36	83	15	23	18	0	5
Jacques Lemaire	77	32	49	81	26	37	8	0	7
Pete Mahovlich	75	35	32	67	103	16	7	4	6
Guy Lafleur	73	29	35	64	48	27	5	0	5
J. C. Tremblay	76	6	51	57	24	52	3	0	2
Marc Tardif	75	31	22	53	81	15	9	0	4
Guy Lapointe	69	11	38	49	58	15	4	0	4
Henri Richard	75	12	32	44	48	10	0	0	1
Claude Larose	77	20	18	38	64	9	1	3	4
Réjean Houle	77	11	17	28	21	9	1	0	1
Jacques Laperrière	73	3	25	28	50	36	2	0	0
Jim Roberts	51	7	15	22	53	3	0	3	1
Larry Pleau	55	7	10	17	19	4	0	0	2
Terry Harper	52	2	12	14	35	9	0	0	0
Serge Savard	23	1	8	9	16	21	0	0	0
Pierre Bouchard	60	3	5	8	39	10	0	0	0
Phil Roberto	27	3	2	5	22	3	0	0	0
Chuck Arnason	17	3	0	3	4	−1	0	0	0
Ken Dryden	64	0	3	3	4	0	0	0	0
Bob Murdoch	11	1	1	2	8	8	0	0	0
Chuck Lefley	16	0	2	2	0	−1	0	0	0
Denis DeJordy	7	0	1	1	0	0	0	0	0
Rey Comeau	4	0	0	0	0	0	0	0	0
Germain Gagnon	4	0	0	0	0	0	0	0	0
Dale Hoganson	21	0	0	0	2	5	0	0	0
Phil Myre	9	0	0	0	4	0	0	0	0
Rogie Vachon	1	0	0	0	0	0	0	0	0

==== Goaltending ====
Player	MIN	GP	W	L	T	GA	GAA	SO
Ken Dryden	3800	64	39	8	15	142	2.24	8
Phil Myre	528	9	4	5	0	32	3.64	0
Denis DeJordy	332	7	3	2	1	25	4.52	0
Rogie Vachon	20	1	0	1	0	4	12.00	0
Team:	4680	78	46	16	16	203	2.60	8

=== Playoffs ===
==== Scoring ====
Player	GP	G	A	Pts	PIM	PPG	SHG	GWG
Frank Mahovlich	6	3	2	5	2	1	0	0
Marc Tardif	6	2	3	5	9	0	0	1
Guy Lafleur	6	1	4	5	2	0	0	0
Yvan Cournoyer	6	2	1	3	2	0	0	0
Claude Larose	6	2	1	3	23	0	0	0
Jacques Lemaire	6	2	1	3	2	0	0	0
Henri Richard	6	0	3	3	4	0	0	0
Terry Harper	5	1	1	2	6	0	0	0
Pete Mahovlich	6	0	2	2	12	0	0	0
J. C. Tremblay	6	0	2	2	0	0	0	0
Jim Roberts	6	1	0	1	0	0	0	1
Guy Lapointe	6	0	1	1	0	0	0	0
Pierre Bouchard	1	0	0	0	0	0	0	0
Ken Dryden	6	0	0	0	0	0	0	0
Réjean Houle	6	0	0	0	2	0	0	0
Jacques Laperrière	4	0	0	0	2	0	0	0
Bob Murdoch	1	0	0	0	0	0	0	0
Larry Pleau	4	0	0	0	0	0	0	0
Serge Savard	6	0	0	0	10	0	0	0

==== Goaltending ====
Player	MIN	GP	W	L	GA	GAA	SO
Ken Dryden	360	6	2	4	17	2.83	0
Team:	360	6	2	4	17	2.83	0

== Awards and records ==
- Calder Memorial Trophy: Ken Dryden

== Transactions ==
May 22, 1971	To California Golden Seals Bobby Sheehan	To Montreal Canadiens cash
August 31, 1971	To California Golden Seals Marshall Johnston	To Montreal Canadiens cash
October, 1971	To California Golden Seals cash	To Montreal Canadiens Jocelyn Hardy
October, 1971	To California Golden Seals cash	To Montreal Canadiens Mike Laughton
October, 1971	To California Golden Seals Lyle Carter; John French	To Montreal Canadiens Randy Rota
October 6, 1971	To California Golden Seals Ray Martyniuk	To Montreal Canadiens Tony Featherstone

== Draft picks ==
Montreal's draft picks at the 1971 NHL amateur draft held at the Queen Elizabeth Hotel in Montreal.

Round	#	Player	Nationality	College/Junior/Club team (League)
1	1	Guy Lafleur	Canada	Quebec Remparts (QMJHL)
1	7	Chuck Arnason	Canada	Flin Flon Bombers (WCHL)
1	11	Murray Wilson	Canada	Ottawa 67's (OHA)
2	20	Larry Robinson	Canada	Kitchener Rangers (OHA)
2	24	Michel DeGuise	Canada	Sorel Eperviers (QMJHL)
2	25	Terry French	Canada	Ottawa 67's (OHA)
3	31	Jim Cahoon	Canada	University of North Dakota (WCHA)
4	45	Ed Sidebottom	Canada	Estevan Bruins (WCHL)
4	53	Greg Hubick	Canada	University of Minnesota Duluth (WCHA)
5	67	Mike Busniuk	Canada	University of Denver (WCHA)
6	81	Ross Butler	Canada	Winnipeg Jets (WCHL)
7	95	Peter Sullivan	Canada	Oshawa Generals (OHA)

== See also ==
- 1971–72 NHL season
