= 1971–72 California Golden Seals season =

NHL season

1971–72 California Golden Seals
- Division: 6th West
- 1971–72 record: 21–39–18
- Home record: 14–12–13
- Road record: 7–27–5
- Goals for: 216
- Goals against: 288

Team information
- General manager: Fred Glover; Garry Young
- Coach: Fred Glover; Vic Stasiuk
- Captain: Carol Vadnais; Bert Marshall
- Alternate captains: Norm Ferguson; Gerry Pinder; Ivan Boldirev
- Arena: Oakland Coliseum Arena

Team leaders
- Goals: Gerry Pinder (23)
- Assists: Dick Redmond (35)
- Points: Gerry Pinder (54)
- Penalty minutes: Paul Shmyr (156)
- Plus/minus: Reggie Leach (+2)
- Wins: Gilles Meloche (16)
- Goals against average: Gilles Meloche (3.32)

The 1971–72 California Golden Seals season was the team's fifth in the NHL. The Seals missed the playoffs again, but posted a solid improvement over the previous season and finished sixth in the West Division.

== Offseason ==
In the amateur draft, the Seals did not have a first-round pick. For their first pick, the fifteenth pick overall, in the second round, the Seals chose Ken Baird. At owner Charlie Finley's direction, the team adopted their infamous white skates this season, which were widely ridiculed.

== Regular season ==
=== Final standings ===
West Division
| | | GP | W | L | T | GF | GA | DIFF | Pts |
|---|---|---|---|---|---|---|---|---|---|
| 1 | Chicago Black Hawks | 78 | 46 | 17 | 15 | 256 | 166 | +90 | 107 |
| 2 | Minnesota North Stars | 78 | 37 | 29 | 12 | 212 | 191 | +21 | 86 |
| 3 | St. Louis Blues | 78 | 28 | 39 | 11 | 208 | 247 | −39 | 67 |
| 4 | Pittsburgh Penguins | 78 | 26 | 38 | 14 | 220 | 258 | −38 | 66 |
| 5 | Philadelphia Flyers | 78 | 26 | 38 | 14 | 200 | 236 | −36 | 66 |
| 6 | California Golden Seals | 78 | 21 | 39 | 18 | 216 | 288 | −72 | 60 |
| 7 | Los Angeles Kings | 78 | 20 | 49 | 9 | 206 | 305 | −99 | 49 |

=== Record vs. opponents ===
==== Vs. West Division ====
1971–72 NHL records
| Team | CAL | CHI | LAK | MIN | PHI | PIT | STL | Total |
|---|---|---|---|---|---|---|---|---|
| California | — | 1–4–1 | 3–2–1 | 1–4–1 | 2–4 | 2–2–2 | 0–3–3 | 9–19–8 |
| Chicago | 4–1–1 | — | 5–1 | 5–1 | 3–2–1 | 5–0–1 | 6–0 | 28–5–3 |
| Los Angeles | 2–3–1 | 1–5 | — | 0–6 | 2–3–1 | 1–4–1 | 2–4 | 8–25–3 |
| Minnesota | 4–1–1 | 1–5 | 6–0 | — | 3–1–2 | 4–2 | 4–2 | 22–11–3 |
| Philadelphia | 4–2 | 2–3–1 | 3–2–1 | 1–3–2 | — | 2–3–1 | 1–2–3 | 13–15–8 |
| Pittsburgh | 2–2–2 | 0–5–1 | 4–1–1 | 2–4 | 3–2–1 | — | 3–3 | 14–17–5 |
| St. Louis | 3–0–3 | 0–6 | 4–2 | 2–4 | 2–1–3 | 3–3 | — | 14–16–6 |

==== Vs. East Division ====
1971–72 NHL records
| Team | BOS | BUF | DET | MTL | NYR | TOR | VAN | Total |
|---|---|---|---|---|---|---|---|---|
| California | 2–4 | 3–0–3 | 2–2–2 | 0–3–3 | 1–4–1 | 2–3–1 | 2–4 | 12–20–10 |
| Chicago | 1–4–1 | 3–2–1 | 5–0–1 | 1–2–3 | 1–2–3 | 4–0–2 | 3–2–1 | 18–12–12 |
| Los Angeles | 1–4–1 | 3–2–1 | 2–3–1 | 0–5–1 | 0–6 | 1–4–1 | 5–0–1 | 12–24–6 |
| Minnesota | 0–5–1 | 2–2–2 | 4–2 | 1–4–1 | 3–1–2 | 2–2–2 | 3–2–1 | 15–18–9 |
| Philadelphia | 0–6 | 2–2–2 | 2–3–1 | 2–3–1 | 0–6 | 2–2–2 | 5–1 | 13–23–6 |
| Pittsburgh | 1–2–3 | 1–2–3 | 2–4 | 1–4–1 | 1–3–2 | 2–4 | 4–2 | 12–21–9 |
| St. Louis | 1–4–1 | 4–1–1 | 3–2–1 | 1–4–1 | 1–5 | 2–4 | 2–3–1 | 14–23–5 |

== Schedule and results ==
1971–72 regular season
October

| Game | Result | Date | Score | Opponent | Record |
|---|---|---|---|---|---|
| 1 | T | October 8, 1971 | 4–4 | Los Angeles Kings (1971–72) | 0–0–1 |
| 2 | T | October 10, 1971 | 3–3 | Toronto Maple Leafs (1971–72) | 0–0–2 |
| 3 | L | October 13, 1971 | 4–5 | Philadelphia Flyers (1971–72) | 0–1–2 |
| 4 | L | October 15, 1971 | 6–9 | Vancouver Canucks (1971–72) | 0–2–2 |
| 5 | L | October 17, 1971 | 2–4 | Pittsburgh Penguins (1971–72) | 0–3–2 |
| 6 | L | October 20, 1971 | 2–4 | Montreal Canadiens (1971–72) | 0–4–2 |
| 7 | L | October 22, 1971 | 1–5 | Boston Bruins (1971–72) | 0–5–2 |
| 8 | W | October 24, 1971 | 6–3 | @ Detroit Red Wings (1971–72) | 1–5–2 |
| 9 | W | October 27, 1971 | 6–4 | @ Pittsburgh Penguins (1971–72) | 2–5–2 |
| 10 | W | October 28, 1971 | 2–0 | @ Boston Bruins (1971–72) | 3–5–2 |
| 11 | T | October 31, 1971 | 2–2 | Buffalo Sabres (1971–72) | 3–5–3 |

November

| Game | Result | Date | Score | Opponent | Record |
|---|---|---|---|---|---|
| 12 | W | November 3, 1971 | 5–3 | Pittsburgh Penguins (1971–72) | 4–5–3 |
| 13 | L | November 5, 1971 | 1–8 | New York Rangers (1971–72) | 4–6–3 |
| 14 | W | November 7, 1971 | 8–1 | Toronto Maple Leafs (1971–72) | 5–6–3 |
| 15 | L | November 11, 1971 | 2–5 | @ Boston Bruins (1971–72) | 5–7–3 |
| 16 | L | November 13, 1971 | 1–5 | @ St. Louis Blues (1971–72) | 5–8–3 |
| 17 | L | November 14, 1971 | 1–4 | @ Chicago Black Hawks (1971–72) | 5–9–3 |
| 18 | L | November 16, 1971 | 2–7 | @ Montreal Canadiens (1971–72) | 5–10–3 |
| 19 | W | November 18, 1971 | 7–5 | @ Buffalo Sabres (1971–72) | 6–10–3 |
| 20 | L | November 20, 1971 | 1–5 | @ Toronto Maple Leafs (1971–72) | 6–11–3 |
| 21 | L | November 21, 1971 | 1–12 | @ New York Rangers (1971–72) | 6–12–3 |
| 22 | W | November 24, 1971 | 6–1 | Detroit Red Wings (1971–72) | 7–12–3 |
| 23 | L | November 26, 1971 | 1–2 | Minnesota North Stars (1971–72) | 7–13–3 |
| 24 | W | November 28, 1971 | 5–3 | Buffalo Sabres (1971–72) | 8–13–3 |
| 25 | L | November 30, 1971 | 2–5 | @ St. Louis Blues (1971–72) | 8–14–3 |

December

| Game | Result | Date | Score | Opponent | Record |
|---|---|---|---|---|---|
| 26 | L | December 1, 1971 | 1–4 | @ Minnesota North Stars (1971–72) | 8–15–3 |
| 27 | W | December 3, 1971 | 2–1 | Chicago Black Hawks (1971–72) | 9–15–3 |
| 28 | L | December 5, 1971 | 0–3 | @ Philadelphia Flyers (1971–72) | 9–16–3 |
| 29 | T | December 8, 1971 | 1–1 | @ Pittsburgh Penguins (1971–72) | 9–16–4 |
| 30 | T | December 10, 1971 | 4–4 | St. Louis Blues (1971–72) | 9–16–5 |
| 31 | W | December 12, 1971 | 4–2 | Boston Bruins (1971–72) | 10–16–5 |
| 32 | T | December 17, 1971 | 3–3 | Detroit Red Wings (1971–72) | 10–16–6 |
| 33 | T | December 19, 1971 | 3–3 | Montreal Canadiens (1971–72) | 10–16–7 |
| 34 | L | December 22, 1971 | 1–4 | Chicago Black Hawks (1971–72) | 10–17–7 |
| 35 | W | December 25, 1971 | 3–1 | @ Los Angeles Kings (1971–72) | 11–17–7 |
| 36 | L | December 26, 1971 | 2–6 | @ Vancouver Canucks (1971–72) | 11–18–7 |
| 37 | L | December 29, 1971 | 2–3 | @ Montreal Canadiens (1971–72) | 11–19–7 |
| 38 | L | December 31, 1971 | 3–6 | @ Detroit Red Wings (1971–72) | 11–20–7 |

January

| Game | Result | Date | Score | Opponent | Record |
|---|---|---|---|---|---|
| 39 | T | January 2, 1972 | 4–4 | @ Buffalo Sabres (1971–72) | 11–20–8 |
| 40 | L | January 4, 1972 | 1–4 | @ Los Angeles Kings (1971–72) | 11–21–8 |
| 41 | W | January 5, 1972 | 6–2 | Los Angeles Kings (1971–72) | 12–21–8 |
| 42 | T | January 7, 1972 | 4–4 | Detroit Red Wings (1971–72) | 12–21–9 |
| 43 | L | January 9, 1972 | 3–10 | @ Philadelphia Flyers (1971–72) | 12–22–9 |
| 44 | W | January 12, 1972 | 2–0 | Minnesota North Stars (1971–72) | 13–22–9 |
| 45 | W | January 14, 1972 | 5–3 | Vancouver Canucks (1971–72) | 14–22–9 |
| 46 | L | January 15, 1972 | 3–4 | @ Vancouver Canucks (1971–72) | 14–23–9 |
| 47 | T | January 18, 1972 | 1–1 | @ Minnesota North Stars (1971–72) | 14–23–10 |
| 48 | L | January 19, 1972 | 0–2 | @ Chicago Black Hawks (1971–72) | 14–24–10 |
| 49 | L | January 21, 1972 | 0–5 | New York Rangers (1971–72) | 14–25–10 |
| 50 | W | January 23, 1972 | 3–1 | Philadelphia Flyers (1971–72) | 15–25–10 |
| 51 | W | January 28, 1972 | 3–0 | Toronto Maple Leafs (1971–72) | 16–25–10 |
| 52 | W | January 30, 1972 | 2–0 | @ Vancouver Canucks (1971–72) | 17–25–10 |

February

| Game | Result | Date | Score | Opponent | Record |
|---|---|---|---|---|---|
| 53 | L | February 2, 1972 | 1–5 | Vancouver Canucks (1971–72) | 17–26–10 |
| 54 | T | February 4, 1972 | 2–2 | Montreal Canadiens (1971–72) | 17–26–11 |
| 55 | L | February 6, 1972 | 2–8 | @ Detroit Red Wings (1971–72) | 17–27–11 |
| 56 | W | February 9, 1972 | 3–2 | Philadelphia Flyers (1971–72) | 18–27–11 |
| 57 | L | February 12, 1972 | 0–3 | @ Toronto Maple Leafs (1971–72) | 18–28–11 |
| 58 | L | February 15, 1972 | 3–6 | @ Boston Bruins (1971–72) | 18–29–11 |
| 59 | T | February 16, 1972 | 1–1 | @ Montreal Canadiens (1971–72) | 18–29–12 |
| 60 | T | February 18, 1972 | 2–2 | New York Rangers (1971–72) | 18–29–13 |
| 61 | T | February 20, 1972 | 4–4 | St. Louis Blues (1971–72) | 18–29–14 |
| 62 | L | February 23, 1972 | 6–8 | Boston Bruins (1971–72) | 18–30–14 |
| 63 | L | February 26, 1972 | 0–3 | @ Chicago Black Hawks (1971–72) | 18–31–14 |
| 64 | T | February 27, 1972 | 4–4 | @ Buffalo Sabres (1971–72) | 18–31–15 |

March

| Game | Result | Date | Score | Opponent | Record |
|---|---|---|---|---|---|
| 65 | L | March 1, 1972 | 1–4 | @ New York Rangers (1971–72) | 18–32–15 |
| 66 | T | March 3, 1972 | 4–4 | Chicago Black Hawks (1971–72) | 18–32–16 |
| 67 | W | March 8, 1972 | 6–3 | Buffalo Sabres (1971–72) | 19–32–16 |
| 68 | L | March 11, 1972 | 1–2 | @ Toronto Maple Leafs (1971–72) | 19–33–16 |
| 69 | W | March 12, 1972 | 7–3 | @ New York Rangers (1971–72) | 20–33–16 |
| 70 | W | March 15, 1972 | 5–2 | Los Angeles Kings (1971–72) | 21–33–16 |
| 71 | T | March 17, 1972 | 2–2 | St. Louis Blues (1971–72) | 21–33–17 |
| 72 | T | March 19, 1972 | 3–3 | Pittsburgh Penguins (1971–72) | 21–33–18 |
| 73 | L | March 21, 1972 | 2–4 | @ Minnesota North Stars (1971–72) | 21–34–18 |
| 74 | L | March 22, 1972 | 1–4 | @ St. Louis Blues (1971–72) | 21–35–18 |
| 75 | L | March 25, 1972 | 0–3 | @ Philadelphia Flyers (1971–72) | 21–36–18 |
| 76 | L | March 29, 1972 | 4–5 | @ Pittsburgh Penguins (1971–72) | 21–37–18 |
| 77 | L | March 31, 1972 | 1–2 | Minnesota North Stars (1971–72) | 21–38–18 |

April

| Game | Result | Date | Score | Opponent | Record |
|---|---|---|---|---|---|
| 78 | L | April 1, 1972 | 4–9 | @ Los Angeles Kings (1971–72) | 21–39–18 |

Legend: Win (2 points) Loss (0 points) Tie (1 point)

== Player statistics ==
=== Skaters ===
Note: GP = Games played; G = Goals; A = Assists; Pts = Points; PIM = Penalties in minutes

| | | Regular season | | | | | Playoffs |
| Player | # | GP | G | A | Pts | PIM | GP | G | A | Pts | PIM |
|---|---|---|---|---|---|---|---|---|---|---|---|
| Gerry Pinder | 15 | 74 | 23 | 31 | 54 | 59 | – | – | – | – | – |
| Bobby Sheehan | 24 | 78 | 20 | 26 | 46 | 12 | – | – | – | – | – |
| Dick Redmond | 4 | 74 | 10 | 35 | 45 | 76 | – | – | – | – | – |
| Ivan Boldirev† | 23 | 57 | 16 | 23 | 39 | 54 | – | – | – | – | – |
| Carol Vadnais‡ | 5 | 52 | 14 | 20 | 34 | 106 | – | – | – | – | – |
| Norm Ferguson | 17 | 77 | 14 | 20 | 34 | 13 | – | – | – | – | – |
| Stan Gilbertson | 10 | 78 | 16 | 16 | 32 | 47 | – | – | – | – | – |
| Joey Johnston | 22 | 77 | 15 | 17 | 32 | 107 | – | – | – | – | – |
| Wayne Carleton | 9 | 76 | 17 | 14 | 31 | 45 | – | – | – | – | – |
| Walt McKechnie | 8 | 56 | 11 | 20 | 31 | 40 | – | – | – | – | – |
| Paul Shmyr | 3 | 69 | 6 | 21 | 27 | 156 | – | – | – | – | – |
| Gary Croteau | 18 | 73 | 12 | 12 | 24 | 11 | – | – | – | – | – |
| Ernie Hicke | 20 | 68 | 11 | 12 | 23 | 55 | – | – | – | – | – |
| Gary Jarrett | 12 | 55 | 5 | 10 | 15 | 18 | – | – | – | – | – |
| Bert Marshall | 19 | 66 | 0 | 14 | 14 | 68 | – | – | – | – | – |
| Reggie Leach† | 7 | 17 | 6 | 7 | 13 | 7 | – | – | – | – | – |
| Marshall Johnston | 2 | 74 | 2 | 11 | 13 | 4 | – | – | – | – | – |
| Tom Williams‡ | 7 | 32 | 3 | 9 | 12 | 2 | – | – | – | – | – |
| Craig Patrick | 14 | 59 | 8 | 3 | 11 | 12 | – | – | – | – | – |
| Rick Smith† | 3 | 17 | 1 | 4 | 5 | 26 | – | – | – | – | – |
| Don O'Donoghue | 11 | 14 | 2 | 2 | 4 | 4 | – | – | – | – | – |
| Ron Stackhouse‡ | 21 | 6 | 1 | 3 | 4 | 6 | – | – | – | – | – |
| Tom Webster† | 8 | 7 | 2 | 1 | 3 | 6 | – | – | – | – | – |
| Bob Stewart† | 6 | 16 | 1 | 2 | 3 | 44 | – | – | – | – | – |
| Ken Baird | 6 | 10 | 0 | 2 | 2 | 15 | – | – | – | – | – |
| Gilles Meloche | 27 | 56 | 0 | 2 | 2 | 6 | – | – | – | – | – |
| Del Hall | 6 | 1 | 0 | 0 | 0 | 0 | – | – | – | – | – |
| Al Simmons | 26 | 1 | 0 | 0 | 0 | 0 | – | – | – | – | – |
| Jim Jones | 21 | 2 | 0 | 0 | 0 | 0 | – | – | – | – | – |
| Frank Hughes | 16 | 5 | 0 | 0 | 0 | 0 | – | – | – | – | – |
| Pete Laframboise | 11 | 5 | 0 | 0 | 0 | 0 | – | – | – | – | – |
| Lyle Carter | 1 | 15 | 0 | 0 | 0 | 2 | – | – | – | – | – |
| Gary Kurt | 30 | 16 | 0 | 0 | 0 | 0 | – | – | – | – | – |

†Denotes player spent time with another team before joining Seals. Stats reflect time with the Seals only. ‡Traded mid-season

=== Goaltenders ===
Note: GP = Games played; TOI = Time on ice (minutes); W = Wins; L = Losses; T = Ties; GA = Goals against; SO = Shutouts; GAA = Goals against average

| | | Regular season | | | | | | | | Playoffs |
| Player | # | GP | TOI | W | L | T | GA | SO | GAA | GP | TOI | W | L | GA | SO | GAA |
|---|---|---|---|---|---|---|---|---|---|---|---|---|---|---|---|---|
| Gilles Meloche | 27 | 56 | 3121 | 16 | 25 | 13 | 173 | 4 | 3.32 | – | – | – | – | – | – | -.-- |
| Lyle Carter | 1 | 15 | 721 | 4 | 7 | 0 | 50 | 0 | 4.16 | – | – | – | – | – | – | -.-- |
| Gary Kurt | 30 | 16 | 838 | 1 | 7 | 5 | 60 | 0 | 4.29 | – | – | – | – | – | – | -.-- |

== Transactions ==
The Seals were involved in the following transactions during the 1971–72 season:

=== Trades ===
| May 20, 1971 | To California Golden Seals Joey Johnston; Walt McKechnie | To Minnesota North Stars Dennis Hextall |
| May 22, 1971 | To California Golden Seals Bobby Sheehan | To Montreal Canadiens cash |
| August 31, 1971 | To California Golden Seals Marshall Johnston | To Montreal Canadiens cash |
| September 4, 1971 | To California Golden Seals cash | To Boston Bruins Doug Roberts |
| September 7, 1971 | To California Golden Seals cash | To Pittsburgh Penguins Bill Hicke |
| September 9, 1971 | To California Golden Seals Kerry Bond; Gerry Desjardins; Gerry Pinder | To Chicago Black Hawks Gary Smith |
| October, 1971 | To California Golden Seals cash | To Montreal Canadiens Jocelyn Hardy |
| October, 1971 | To California Golden Seals cash | To Montreal Canadiens Mike Laughton |
| October, 1971 | To California Golden Seals Lyle Carter; John French | To Montreal Canadiens Randy Rota |
| October 6, 1971 | To California Golden Seals Ray Martyniuk | To Montreal Canadiens Tony Featherstone |
| October 18, 1971 | To California Golden Seals Gilles Meloche; Paul Shmyr | To Chicago Black Hawks Gerry Desjardins |
| October 22, 1971 | To California Golden Seals Tom Webster | To Detroit Red Wings Ron Stackhouse |
| November 17, 1971 | To California Golden Seals Ivan Boldirev | To Boston Bruins Rich Leduc; Chris Oddleifson |
| February 23, 1972 | To California Golden Seals Reggie Leach; Rick Smith; Bob Stewart | To Boston Bruins Don O'Donoghue; Carol Vadnais |
| March 5, 1972 | To California Golden Seals cash | To Boston Bruins Tom Williams |

=== Additions and subtractions ===
Additions
| Player | Former team | Via |
| Jim Jones | Boston Bruins | free agency (1971–06) |
| Gary Kurt | Cleveland Barons (AHL) | Intra-league Draft (1971–06–07) |
| Stan Gilbertson | Boston Bruins | Intra-league Draft (1971–06–08) |
| Frank Hughes | Toronto Maple Leafs | Intra-league Draft (1971–06–08) |
| Del Hall | St. Clair College (OUAA) | free agency (1971–10) |
| Wayne King | Niagara Falls Flyers (OHA) | free agency (1971–10) |
| Craig Patrick | Montreal Voyageurs (AHL) | free agency (1971–10–06) |

Subtractions
| Player | New team | Via |
| Bob Sneddon | Detroit Red Wings | Reverse Draft (1971–06) |

== Draft picks ==
=== Amateur draft ===
| Round | Pick | Player | Nationality | College/Junior/Club team |
|---|---|---|---|---|
| 2 | 15. | Ken Baird | Canada | Flin Flon Bombers (WCHL) |
| 3 | 29. | Rich Leduc | Canada | Trois-Rivières Ducs (QMJHL) |
| 4 | 43. | Hartland Monahan | Canada | Montreal Junior Canadiens (OHA) |
| 5 | 57. | Ray Belanger | Canada | Shawinigan Bruins (QMJHL) |
| 6 | 71. | Gerry Egers | Canada | Sudbury Wolves (NOJHL) |
| 7 | 85. | Al Simmons | Canada | Winnipeg Jets (WCHL) |
| 8 | 99. | Angus Beck | Canada | Charlottetown (Junior A) |
| 8 | 104. | Rod Lyons | Canada | Halifax (Junior) |

== See also ==
- 1971–72 NHL season
