= 1971–72 Boston Bruins season =

NHL team season

1971–72 Boston Bruins
- Stanley Cup champions
- East Division champions
- Division: 1st East
- 1971–72 record: 54–13–11
- Home record: 28–4–7
- Road record: 26–9–4
- Goals for: 330
- Goals against: 204

Team information
- General manager: Milt Schmidt
- Coach: Tom Johnson
- Captain: Vacant
- Alternate captains: Johnny Bucyk; Phil Esposito; Ted Green; Ed Westfall
- Arena: Boston Garden

Team leaders
- Goals: Phil Esposito (66)
- Assists: Bobby Orr (80)
- Points: Phil Esposito (130)
- Penalty minutes: Dallas Smith (132)
- Wins: Eddie Johnston and Gerry Cheevers (27)
- Goals against average: Gerry Cheevers (2.50)

The 1971–72 Boston Bruins season was the Bruins' 48th season in the NHL. For the second time in three years, the Bruins won the Stanley Cup.

== Offseason ==
=== NHL draft ===
Round	Overall	Player
1	5	Ron Jones
1	14	Terry O'Reilly
2	28	Curt Ridley
3	42	Dave Bonter
4	56	Dave Hynes
5	70	Bert Scott
6	84	Bob MacMahon

== Regular season ==
=== Season standings ===
East Division
		GP	W	L	T	GF	GA	DIFF	Pts
1	Boston Bruins	78	54	13	11	330	204	+126	119
2	New York Rangers	78	48	17	13	317	192	+125	109
3	Montreal Canadiens	78	46	16	16	307	205	+102	108
4	Toronto Maple Leafs	78	33	31	14	209	208	+1	80
5	Detroit Red Wings	78	33	35	10	261	262	−1	76
6	Buffalo Sabres	78	16	43	19	203	289	−86	51
7	Vancouver Canucks	78	20	50	8	203	297	−94	48

=== Record vs. opponents ===
==== Vs. East Division ====
1971–72 NHL records
Team	BOS	BUF	DET	MTL	NYR	TOR	VAN	Total
Boston	—	3–1–2	5–1	2–3–1	5–1	4–1–1	6–0	25–7–4
Buffalo	1–3–2	—	0–4–2	1–4–1	0–6	1–5	2–3–1	5–25–6
Detroit	1–5	4–0–2	—	3–3	1–4–1	3–3	5–0–1	17–15–4
Montreal	3–2–1	4–1–1	3–3	—	1–3–2	4–1–1	6–0	21–10–5
New York	1–5	6–0	4–1–1	3–1–2	—	2–2–2	5–1	21–10–5
Toronto	1–4–1	5–1	3–3	1–4–1	2–2–2	—	2–2–2	14–16–6
Vancouver	0–6	3–2–1	0–5–1	0–6	1–5	2–2–2	—	6–26–4

==== Vs. West Division ====
1971–72 NHL records
Team	CAL	CHI	LAK	MIN	PHI	PIT	STL	Total
Boston	4–2	4–1–1	4–1–1	5–0–1	6–0	2–1–3	4–1–1	29–6–7
Buffalo	0–3–3	2–3–1	2–3–1	2–2–2	2–2–2	2–1–3	1–4–1	11–18–13
Detroit	2–2–2	0–5–1	3–2–1	2–4	3–2–1	4–2	2–3–1	16–20–6
Montreal	3–0–3	2–1–3	5–0–1	4–1–1	3–2–1	4–1–1	4–1–1	25–6–11
New York	4–1–1	2–1–3	6–0	1–3–2	6–0	3–1–2	5–1	27–7–8
Toronto	3–2–1	0–4–2	4–1–1	2–2–2	2–2–2	4–2	4–2	19–15–8
Vancouver	4–2	2–3–1	0–5–1	2–3–1	1–5	2–4	3–2–1	14–24–4

== Playoffs ==
Boston defeated the Toronto Maple Leafs 4–1 and the St. Louis Blues 4–0 to advance to the final.

=== Stanley Cup Finals ===
As of 2022, the 1972 Bruins are the most recent team to have won the Cup without a formal captain. John Bucyk, as the team's senior alternate captain, accepted the Cup and circled the rink in the ceremonial skate.

== Schedule and results ==
=== Regular season ===
1971–72 regular season
October

Game	Result	Date	Score	Opponent	Record
1	L	October 10, 1971	1–4	New York Rangers (1971–72)	0–1–0
2	W	October 13, 1971	6–1	@ New York Rangers (1971–72)	1–1–0
3	W	October 14, 1971	6–2	Buffalo Sabres (1971–72)	2–1–0
4	T	October 17, 1971	2–2	Toronto Maple Leafs (1971–72)	2–1–1
5	W	October 20, 1971	4–3	Detroit Red Wings (1971–72)	3–1–1
6	W	October 22, 1971	5–1	@ California Golden Seals (1971–72)	4–1–1
7	W	October 24, 1971	4–3	@ Vancouver Canucks (1971–72)	5–1–1
8	L	October 27, 1971	2–5	@ Montreal Canadiens (1971–72)	5–2–1
9	L	October 28, 1971	0–2	California Golden Seals (1971–72)	5–3–1
10	W	October 31, 1971	5–2	Minnesota North Stars (1971–72)	6–3–1

November

Game	Result	Date	Score	Opponent	Record
11	W	November 4, 1971	6–1	St. Louis Blues (1971–72)	7–3–1
12	W	November 6, 1971	2–1	@ Detroit Red Wings (1971–72)	8–3–1
13	L	November 7, 1971	2–3	Montreal Canadiens (1971–72)	8–4–1
14	L	November 10, 1971	1–3	@ Chicago Black Hawks (1971–72)	8–5–1
15	W	November 11, 1971	5–2	California Golden Seals (1971–72)	9–5–1
16	W	November 14, 1971	11–2	Los Angeles Kings (1971–72)	10–5–1
17	W	November 18, 1971	5–0	Vancouver Canucks (1971–72)	11–5–1
18	W	November 20, 1971	2–1	Chicago Black Hawks (1971–72)	12–5–1
19	W	November 21, 1971	6–2	St. Louis Blues (1971–72)	13–5–1
20	W	November 24, 1971	2–1	@ Philadelphia Flyers (1971–72)	14–5–1
21	W	November 25, 1971	4–2	Philadelphia Flyers (1971–72)	15–5–1
22	T	November 27, 1971	6–6	@ St. Louis Blues (1971–72)	15–5–2

December

Game	Result	Date	Score	Opponent	Record
23	W	December 4, 1971	5–3	@ Toronto Maple Leafs (1971–72)	16–5–2
24	W	December 5, 1971	5–3	Pittsburgh Penguins (1971–72)	17–5–2
25	W	December 8, 1971	5–3	@ Los Angeles Kings (1971–72)	18–5–2
26	W	December 11, 1971	6–2	@ Vancouver Canucks (1971–72)	19–5–2
27	L	December 12, 1971	2–4	@ California Golden Seals (1971–72)	19–6–2
28	W	December 16, 1971	8–1	New York Rangers (1971–72)	20–6–2
29	W	December 18, 1971	4–3	@ Pittsburgh Penguins (1971–72)	21–6–2
30	T	December 19, 1971	2–2	Pittsburgh Penguins (1971–72)	21–6–3
31	T	December 23, 1971	4–4	@ Buffalo Sabres (1971–72)	21–6–4
32	W	December 25, 1971	5–1	Philadelphia Flyers (1971–72)	22–6–4
33	W	December 26, 1971	3–1	Toronto Maple Leafs (1971–72)	23–6–4
34	W	December 29, 1971	5–1	@ Chicago Black Hawks (1971–72)	24–6–4
35	T	December 30, 1971	2–2	@ Minnesota North Stars (1971–72)	24–6–5

January

Game	Result	Date	Score	Opponent	Record
36	W	January 2, 1972	4–1	@ New York Rangers (1971–72)	25–6–5
37	W	January 5, 1972	2–0	@ Toronto Maple Leafs (1971–72)	26–6–5
38	W	January 6, 1972	5–2	@ Buffalo Sabres (1971–72)	27–6–5
39	L	January 8, 1972	3–5	@ St. Louis Blues (1971–72)	27–7–5
40	T	January 12, 1972	2–2	@ Pittsburgh Penguins (1971–72)	27–7–6
41	T	January 13, 1972	1–1	Los Angeles Kings (1971–72)	27–7–7
42	W	January 15, 1972	4–2	Chicago Black Hawks (1971–72)	28–7–7
43	W	January 16, 1972	9–2	Detroit Red Wings (1971–72)	29–7–7
44	W	January 18, 1972	2–0	@ St. Louis Blues (1971–72)	30–7–7
45	W	January 22, 1972	8–5	@ Montreal Canadiens (1971–72)	31–7–7
46	T	January 23, 1972	3–3	Buffalo Sabres (1971–72)	31–7–8
47	W	January 27, 1972	4–2	Philadelphia Flyers (1971–72)	32–7–8
48	W	January 29, 1972	4–2	@ Philadelphia Flyers (1971–72)	33–7–8
49	W	January 30, 1972	5–2	St. Louis Blues (1971–72)	34–7–8

February

Game	Result	Date	Score	Opponent	Record
50	W	February 2, 1972	2–0	@ New York Rangers (1971–72)	35–7–8
51	W	February 3, 1972	6–1	Minnesota North Stars (1971–72)	36–7–8
52	W	February 5, 1972	3–2	Detroit Red Wings (1971–72)	37–7–8
53	L	February 6, 1972	2–8	@ Buffalo Sabres (1971–72)	37–8–8
54	W	February 10, 1972	9–1	Vancouver Canucks (1971–72)	38–8–8
55	W	February 12, 1972	5–1	Buffalo Sabres (1971–72)	39–8–8
56	T	February 13, 1972	2–2	Montreal Canadiens (1971–72)	39–8–9
57	W	February 15, 1972	6–3	California Golden Seals (1971–72)	40–8–9
58	W	February 17, 1972	4–1	@ Philadelphia Flyers (1971–72)	41–8–9
59	W	February 19, 1972	6–4	@ Minnesota North Stars (1971–72)	42–8–9
60	W	February 20, 1972	3–1	@ Chicago Black Hawks (1971–72)	43–8–9
61	W	February 22, 1972	4–3	@ Vancouver Canucks (1971–72)	44–8–9
62	W	February 23, 1972	8–6	@ California Golden Seals (1971–72)	45–8–9
63	W	February 26, 1972	5–4	@ Los Angeles Kings (1971–72)	46–8–9

March

Game	Result	Date	Score	Opponent	Record
64	W	March 2, 1972	7–3	Vancouver Canucks (1971–72)	47–8–9
65	W	March 4, 1972	5–4	@ Detroit Red Wings (1971–72)	48–8–9
66	L	March 5, 1972	0–2	Los Angeles Kings (1971–72)	48–9–9
67	W	March 8, 1972	5–4	@ Minnesota North Stars (1971–72)	49–9–9
68	L	March 11, 1972	4–6	@ Pittsburgh Penguins (1971–72)	49–10–9
69	T	March 12, 1972	4–4	Pittsburgh Penguins (1971–72)	49–10–10
70	W	March 16, 1972	8–3	@ Los Angeles Kings (1971–72)	50–10–10
71	W	March 19, 1972	7–3	Minnesota North Stars (1971–72)	51–10–10
72	W	March 23, 1972	4–1	New York Rangers (1971–72)	52–10–10
73	T	March 25, 1972	5–5	Chicago Black Hawks (1971–72)	52–10–11
74	W	March 26, 1972	5–4	Montreal Canadiens (1971–72)	53–10–11
75	L	March 28, 1972	3–6	@ Detroit Red Wings (1971–72)	53–11–11
76	L	March 29, 1972	1–4	@ Toronto Maple Leafs (1971–72)	53–12–11

April

Game	Result	Date	Score	Opponent	Record
77	L	April 1, 1972	2–6	@ Montreal Canadiens (1971–72)	53–13–11
78	W	April 2, 1972	6–4	Toronto Maple Leafs (1971–72)	54–13–11

Legend: Win (2 points) Loss (0 points) Tie (1 point)

=== Playoffs ===
1972 Stanley Cup playoffs
Quarterfinals vs. (E4) Toronto Maple Leafs – Bruins win 4–1

Game	Date	Visitor	Score	Home	OT	Series
1	April 5	Toronto Maple Leafs	0–5	Boston Bruins		1–0
2	April 6	Toronto Maple Leafs	4–3	Boston Bruins	2:58	1–1
3	April 8	Boston Bruins	2–0	Toronto Maple Leafs		2–1
4	April 9	Boston Bruins	5–4	Toronto Maple Leafs		3–1
5	April 11	Toronto Maple Leafs	2–3	Boston Bruins		4–1

Semifinals vs. (W3) St. Louis Blues – Bruins win 4–0

Game	Date	Visitor	Score	Home	OT	Series
1	April 18	St. Louis Blues	1–6	Boston Bruins		1–0
2	April 20	St. Louis Blues	2–10	Boston Bruins		2–0
3	April 23	Boston Bruins	7–2	St. Louis Blues		3–0
4	April 25	Boston Bruins	5–3	St. Louis Blues		4–0

Stanley Cup Finals vs. (E2) New York Rangers – Bruins win 4–2

Game	Date	Visitor	Score	Home	OT	Series
1	April 30	New York Rangers	5–6	Boston Bruins		1–0
2	May 2	New York Rangers	1–2	Boston Bruins		2–0
3	May 4	Boston Bruins	2–5	New York Rangers		2–1
4	May 7	Boston Bruins	3–2	New York Rangers		3–1
5	May 9	New York Rangers	3–2	Boston Bruins		3–2
6	May 11	Boston Bruins	3–0	New York Rangers		4–2

Legend: Win Loss

== Player statistics ==
=== Regular season ===
Scoring

Player	Pos	GP	G	A	Pts	PIM	+/-	PPG	SHG	GWG
Phil Esposito	C	76	66	67	133	76	55	28	2	16
Bobby Orr	D	76	37	80	117	106	86	11	4	4
John Bucyk	LW	78	32	51	83	4	16	13	0	7
Fred Stanfield	LW	78	23	56	79	12	20	5	1	4
John McKenzie	RW	77	22	47	69	126	19	10	0	3
Derek Sanderson	C	78	25	33	58	108	25	0	7	2
Mike Walton	C	76	28	28	56	45	23	6	0	4
Ken Hodge	RW	60	16	40	56	81	41	0	1	2
Wayne Cashman	LW	74	23	29	52	103	42	1	0	3
Ed Westfall	D/RW	77	18	26	44	19	29	0	2	5
Dallas Smith	D	78	8	22	30	132	34	0	1	1
Garnet Bailey	LW	73	9	13	22	64	11	0	0	0
Reggie Leach	RW	56	7	13	20	12	5	0	0	2
Ted Green	D	54	1	16	17	21	10	0	0	0
Rick Smith	D	61	2	12	14	46	53	0	0	0
Don Marcotte	LW	47	6	4	10	12	0	0	0	1
Carol Vadnais	D	16	4	6	10	37	2	0	0	0
Don Awrey	D	34	1	8	9	52	20	0	0	0
Eddie Johnston	G	38	0	4	4	0	0	0	0	0
Ivan Boldirev	C	11	0	2	2	6	2	0	0	0
Gerry Cheevers	G	41	0	2	2	25	0	0	0	0
Terry O'Reilly	RW	1	1	0	1	0	3	0	0	0
Doug Roberts	RW	3	1	0	1	0	1	0	0	0
Matt Ravlich	D	25	0	1	1	2	4	0	0	0
Nick Beverley	D	1	0	0	0	0	0	0	0	0
Ron Jones	D	1	0	0	0	0	1	0	0	0
Garry Peters	C	2	0	0	0	2	0	0	0	0
Bob Stewart	D	8	0	0	0	15	3	0	0	0

Goaltending

Player	MIN	GP	W	L	T	GA	GAA	SO
Gerry Cheevers	2420	41	27	5	8	101	2.50	2
Eddie Johnston	2260	38	27	8	3	102	2.71	2
Team:	4680	78	54	13	11	203	2.60	4

=== Playoffs ===
Scoring

Player	Pos	GP	G	A	Pts	PIM	PPG	SHG	GWG
Phil Esposito	C	15	9	15	24	24	2	0	3
Bobby Orr	D	15	5	19	24	19	3	0	1
John Bucyk	LW	15	9	11	20	6	5	0	0
Ken Hodge	RW	15	9	8	17	62	2	1	3
John McKenzie	RW	15	5	12	17	37	3	0	0
Fred Stanfield	LW	15	7	9	16	0	1	0	0
Mike Walton	C	15	6	6	12	13	1	0	2
Wayne Cashman	LW	15	4	7	11	42	1	0	0
Ed Westfall	D/RW	15	4	3	7	10	0	2	1
Garnet Bailey	LW	13	2	4	6	16	0	0	1
Don Awrey	D	15	0	4	4	45	0	0	0
Dallas Smith	D	15	0	4	4	22	0	0	0
Don Marcotte	LW	14	3	0	3	6	0	1	1
Derek Sanderson	C	11	1	1	2	44	0	1	0
Carol Vadnais	D	15	0	2	2	43	0	0	0
Gerry Cheevers	G	8	0	0	0	0	0	0	0
Ted Green	D	10	0	0	0	0	0	0	0
Chris Hayes	LW	1	0	0	0	0	0	0	0
Eddie Johnston	G	7	0	0	0	0	0	0	0
Garry Peters	C	1	0	0	0	0	0	0	0

Goaltending

Player	MIN	GP	W	L	GA	GAA	SO
Gerry Cheevers	483	8	6	2	21	2.61	2
Eddie Johnston	420	7	6	1	13	1.86	1
Team:	903	15	12	3	34	2.26	3

Note:

Pos = Position;GP = Games played; G = Goals; A = Assists; Pts = Points; PIM = Penalty minutes; +/- = Plus/minus; PPG = Power-play goals; SHG = Short-handed goals; GWG = Game-winning goals
Pos = Position;GP = Games played; Min, TOI = Minutes played; W = Wins; L = Losses; T,T/OT = Ties; OTL = Overtime losses; GA = Goals-against; GAA = Goals-against average; SO = Shutouts; SA = Shots against; SV = Shots saved;SV% = Save percentage;

== Transactions ==
September 4, 1971	To California Golden Seals cash	To Boston Bruins Doug Roberts
November 17, 1971	To California Golden Seals Ivan Boldirev	To Boston Bruins Rich Leduc; Chris Oddleifson
February 23, 1972	To California Golden Seals Reggie Leach; Rick Smith; Bob Stewart	To Boston Bruins Don O'Donoghue; Carol Vadnais
March 5, 1972	To California Golden Seals cash	To Boston Bruins Tom Williams

== Awards and records ==
- Prince of Wales Trophy
- Phil Esposito, Art Ross Trophy Winner
- Bobby Orr, Conn Smythe Trophy
- Bobby Orr, Norris Trophy
