= 1971–72 Toronto Maple Leafs season =

NHL hockey team season

1971–72 Toronto Maple Leafs
- Division: 4th East
- 1971–72 record: 33–31–14
- Home record: 21–11–7
- Road record: 12–20–7
- Goals for: 209
- Goals against: 208

Team information
- General manager: Jim Gregory
- Coach: John McLellan
- Captain: Dave Keon
- Arena: Maple Leaf Gardens

Team leaders
- Goals: Paul Henderson (38)
- Assists: Norm Ullman (50)
- Points: Norm Ullman (73)
- Penalty minutes: Rick Ley (124)
- Wins: Bernie Parent (17)
- Goals against average: Bernie Parent (2.56)

The 1971–72 Toronto Maple Leafs season was Toronto's 55th season of operation in the National Hockey League (NHL). It was also the 40th anniversary season of the opening of Maple Leaf Gardens. The Maple Leafs finished fourth, and qualified for the playoffs for the second year in a row, losing in the first round to the eventual Stanley Cup champion Boston Bruins.

== Offseason ==
In June, team president Stafford Smythe and vice-president Harold Ballard were arrested for theft and fraud involving funds of Maple Leaf Gardens. They were charged jointly on the theft of $146,000 of funds and securities and Smythe was further charged for defrauding Maple Leaf Gardens of $249,000.

== Regular season ==
On October 13, just after the start of the season, Smythe died of complications from a bleeding ulcer. The Leaf's home opener, scheduled for that night was postponed, only the second postponement in Maple Leaf Gardens history.

=== Final standings ===
East Division
		GP	W	L	T	GF	GA	DIFF	Pts
1	Boston Bruins	78	54	13	11	330	204	+126	119
2	New York Rangers	78	48	17	13	317	192	+125	109
3	Montreal Canadiens	78	46	16	16	307	205	+102	108
4	Toronto Maple Leafs	78	33	31	14	209	208	+1	80
5	Detroit Red Wings	78	33	35	10	261	262	−1	76
6	Buffalo Sabres	78	16	43	19	203	289	−86	51
7	Vancouver Canucks	78	20	50	8	203	297	−94	48

=== Record vs. opponents ===
==== Vs. East Division ====
1971–72 NHL records
Team	BOS	BUF	DET	MTL	NYR	TOR	VAN	Total
Boston	—	3–1–2	5–1	2–3–1	5–1	4–1–1	6–0	25–7–4
Buffalo	1–3–2	—	0–4–2	1–4–1	0–6	1–5	2–3–1	5–25–6
Detroit	1–5	4–0–2	—	3–3	1–4–1	3–3	5–0–1	17–15–4
Montreal	3–2–1	4–1–1	3–3	—	1–3–2	4–1–1	6–0	21–10–5
New York	1–5	6–0	4–1–1	3–1–2	—	2–2–2	5–1	21–10–5
Toronto	1–4–1	5–1	3–3	1–4–1	2–2–2	—	2–2–2	14–16–6
Vancouver	0–6	3–2–1	0–5–1	0–6	1–5	2–2–2	—	6–26–4

==== Vs. West Division ====
1971–72 NHL records
Team	CAL	CHI	LAK	MIN	PHI	PIT	STL	Total
Boston	4–2	4–1–1	4–1–1	5–0–1	6–0	2–1–3	4–1–1	29–6–7
Buffalo	0–3–3	2–3–1	2–3–1	2–2–2	2–2–2	2–1–3	1–4–1	11–18–13
Detroit	2–2–2	0–5–1	3–2–1	2–4	3–2–1	4–2	2–3–1	16–20–6
Montreal	3–0–3	2–1–3	5–0–1	4–1–1	3–2–1	4–1–1	4–1–1	25–6–11
New York	4–1–1	2–1–3	6–0	1–3–2	6–0	3–1–2	5–1	27–7–8
Toronto	3–2–1	0–4–2	4–1–1	2–2–2	2–2–2	4–2	4–2	19–15–8
Vancouver	4–2	2–3–1	0–5–1	2–3–1	1–5	2–4	3–2–1	14–24–4

== Schedule and results ==
1971–72 regular season
October

Game	Result	Date	Score	Opponent	Record
1	W	October 8, 1971	3–2	@ Vancouver Canucks (1971–72)	1–0–0
2	T	October 10, 1971	3–3	@ California Golden Seals (1971–72)	1–0–1
3	L	October 16, 1971	3–5	New York Rangers (1971–72)	1–1–1
4	T	October 17, 1971	2–2	@ Boston Bruins (1971–72)	1–1–2
5	L	October 20, 1971	2–7	Buffalo Sabres (1971–72)	1–2–2
6	L	October 22, 1971	2–5	@ Detroit Red Wings (1971–72)	1–3–2
7	W	October 23, 1971	5–3	Philadelphia Flyers (1971–72)	2–3–2
8	T	October 27, 1971	0–0	Vancouver Canucks (1971–72)	2–3–3
9	T	October 30, 1971	1–1	Minnesota North Stars (1971–72)	2–3–4
10	T	October 31, 1971	3–3	@ New York Rangers (1971–72)	2–3–5

November

Game	Result	Date	Score	Opponent	Record
11	W	November 1, 1971	6–1	Detroit Red Wings (1971–72)	3–3–5
12	L	November 3, 1971	1–2	@ Minnesota North Stars (1971–72)	3–4–5
13	W	November 6, 1971	3–2	@ Los Angeles Kings (1971–72)	4–4–5
14	L	November 7, 1971	1–8	@ California Golden Seals (1971–72)	4–5–5
15	L	November 10, 1971	2–5	Montreal Canadiens (1971–72)	4–6–5
16	T	November 13, 1971	2–2	Vancouver Canucks (1971–72)	4–6–6
17	T	November 14, 1971	3–3	@ Philadelphia Flyers (1971–72)	4–6–7
18	W	November 17, 1971	5–1	Los Angeles Kings (1971–72)	5–6–7
19	W	November 20, 1971	5–1	California Golden Seals (1971–72)	6–6–7
20	W	November 21, 1971	4–3	@ Buffalo Sabres (1971–72)	7–6–7
21	W	November 24, 1971	2–1	@ Pittsburgh Penguins (1971–72)	8–6–7
22	T	November 27, 1971	3–3	Chicago Black Hawks (1971–72)	8–6–8
23	L	November 28, 1971	1–4	@ Chicago Black Hawks (1971–72)	8–7–8

December

Game	Result	Date	Score	Opponent	Record
24	W	December 1, 1971	4–2	St. Louis Blues (1971–72)	9–7–8
25	L	December 4, 1971	3–5	Boston Bruins (1971–72)	9–8–8
26	W	December 8, 1971	3–1	Minnesota North Stars (1971–72)	10–8–8
27	L	December 11, 1971	1–3	Chicago Black Hawks (1971–72)	10–9–8
28	W	December 12, 1971	4–2	@ Buffalo Sabres (1971–72)	11–9–8
29	W	December 14, 1971	4–2	@ St. Louis Blues (1971–72)	12–9–8
30	W	December 15, 1971	3–2	Pittsburgh Penguins (1971–72)	13–9–8
31	W	December 18, 1971	8–1	Buffalo Sabres (1971–72)	14–9–8
32	W	December 19, 1971	4–0	@ Philadelphia Flyers (1971–72)	15–9–8
33	L	December 22, 1971	2–4	@ Montreal Canadiens (1971–72)	15–10–8
34	W	December 25, 1971	5–3	Detroit Red Wings (1971–72)	16–10–8
35	L	December 26, 1971	1–3	@ Boston Bruins (1971–72)	16–11–8
36	W	December 28, 1971	4–2	@ Pittsburgh Penguins (1971–72)	17–11–8
37	L	December 29, 1971	3–6	St. Louis Blues (1971–72)	17–12–8

January

Game	Result	Date	Score	Opponent	Record
38	W	January 1, 1972	5–2	Montreal Canadiens (1971–72)	18–12–8
39	L	January 5, 1972	0–2	Boston Bruins (1971–72)	18–13–8
40	T	January 8, 1972	2–2	Philadelphia Flyers (1971–72)	18–13–9
41	W	January 9, 1972	2–1	@ Buffalo Sabres (1971–72)	19–13–9
42	T	January 12, 1972	1–1	Los Angeles Kings (1971–72)	19–13–10
43	W	January 15, 1972	4–3	New York Rangers (1971–72)	20–13–10
44	L	January 16, 1972	3–4	St. Louis Blues (1971–72)	20–14–10
45	L	January 19, 1972	0–1	@ Montreal Canadiens (1971–72)	20–15–10
46	L	January 22, 1972	1–4	@ Minnesota North Stars (1971–72)	20–16–10
47	L	January 23, 1972	0–4	@ Chicago Black Hawks (1971–72)	20–17–10
48	L	January 26, 1972	3–5	@ Los Angeles Kings (1971–72)	20–18–10
49	L	January 28, 1972	0–3	@ California Golden Seals (1971–72)	20–19–10
50	L	January 29, 1972	2–5	@ Vancouver Canucks (1971–72)	20–20–10

February

Game	Result	Date	Score	Opponent	Record
51	L	February 1, 1972	0–4	@ Detroit Red Wings (1971–72)	20–21–10
52	W	February 2, 1972	3–2	Minnesota North Stars (1971–72)	21–21–10
53	L	February 5, 1972	1–3	Philadelphia Flyers (1971–72)	21–22–10
54	T	February 6, 1972	2–2	@ New York Rangers (1971–72)	21–22–11
55	W	February 8, 1972	2–1	@ St. Louis Blues (1971–72)	22–22–11
56	L	February 9, 1972	1–4	Pittsburgh Penguins (1971–72)	22–23–11
57	W	February 12, 1972	3–0	California Golden Seals (1971–72)	23–23–11
58	L	February 13, 1972	1–3	@ Chicago Black Hawks (1971–72)	23–24–11
59	L	February 16, 1972	2–4	@ Pittsburgh Penguins (1971–72)	23–25–11
60	W	February 19, 1972	4–1	Buffalo Sabres (1971–72)	24–25–11
61	L	February 20, 1972	1–3	@ Philadelphia Flyers (1971–72)	24–26–11
62	L	February 22, 1972	4–5	@ Detroit Red Wings (1971–72)	24–27–11
63	W	February 23, 1972	2–0	Pittsburgh Penguins (1971–72)	25–27–11
64	W	February 26, 1972	7–1	Vancouver Canucks (1971–72)	26–27–11

March

Game	Result	Date	Score	Opponent	Record
65	W	March 1, 1972	3–1	@ St. Louis Blues (1971–72)	27–27–11
66	W	March 4, 1972	3–2	Los Angeles Kings (1971–72)	28–27–11
67	W	March 8, 1972	5–1	Detroit Red Wings (1971–72)	29–27–11
68	W	March 11, 1972	2–1	California Golden Seals (1971–72)	30–27–11
69	T	March 12, 1972	2–2	@ Minnesota North Stars (1971–72)	30–27–12
70	L	March 15, 1972	2–5	Montreal Canadiens (1971–72)	30–28–12
71	T	March 18, 1972	2–2	Chicago Black Hawks (1971–72)	30–28–13
72	L	March 19, 1972	3–5	@ New York Rangers (1971–72)	30–29–13
73	T	March 22, 1972	3–3	@ Montreal Canadiens (1971–72)	30–29–14
74	L	March 24, 1972	3–5	@ Vancouver Canucks (1971–72)	30–30–14
75	W	March 25, 1972	4–0	@ Los Angeles Kings (1971–72)	31–30–14
76	W	March 29, 1972	4–1	Boston Bruins (1971–72)	32–30–14

April

Game	Result	Date	Score	Opponent	Record
77	W	April 1, 1972	2–1	New York Rangers (1971–72)	33–30–14
78	L	April 2, 1972	4–6	@ Boston Bruins (1971–72)	33–31–14

Legend: Win (2 points) Loss (0 points) Tie (1 point)

== Player statistics ==
=== Regular season ===
Scoring

Player	GP	G	A	Pts	PIM	+/-	PPG	SHG	GWG
Norm Ullman	77	23	50	73	26	8	9	0	1
Paul Henderson	73	38	19	57	32	14	12	1	5
Dave Keon	72	18	30	48	4	1	2	2	5
Ron Ellis	78	23	24	47	17	7	4	0	7
Jim Harrison	66	19	17	36	104	-4	5	0	0
Jim McKenny	76	5	31	36	27	1	2	0	0
Darryl Sittler	74	15	17	32	44	-4	1	0	4
Garry Monahan	78	14	17	31	47	2	2	1	2
Jim Dorey	50	4	19	23	56	10	1	0	2
Guy Trottier	52	9	12	21	16	-12	2	0	1
Brad Selwood	72	4	17	21	58	7	2	0	1
Billy MacMillan	61	10	7	17	39	-1	2	0	2
Denis Dupere	77	7	10	17	4	5	1	0	0
Rick Kehoe	38	8	8	16	4	-1	2	0	0
Donnie Marshall	50	2	14	16	0	2	1	0	0
Rick Ley	67	1	14	15	124	3	0	0	0
Bob Baun	74	2	12	14	101	8	0	0	0
Brian Glennie	61	2	8	10	44	11	0	0	1
Pierre Jarry	18	3	4	7	13	-3	0	0	1
Brian Spencer	36	1	5	6	65	2	0	0	0
Mike Pelyk	46	1	4	5	44	-2	0	0	0
Bernie Parent	47	0	1	1	6	0	0	0	0
Brian Marchinko	3	0	0	0	0	0	0	0	0
Gerry O'Flaherty	2	0	0	0	0	0	0	0	0
Jacques Plante	34	0	0	0	2	0	0	0	0

Goaltending

Player	MIN	GP	W	L	T	GA	GAA	SO
Bernie Parent	2715	47	17	18	9	116	2.56	3
Jacques Plante	1965	34	16	13	5	86	2.63	2
Team:	4680	78	33	31	14	202	2.59	5

=== Playoffs ===
Scoring

Player	GP	G	A	Pts	PIM	PPG	SHG	GWG
Dave Keon	5	2	3	5	0	0	0	0
Norm Ullman	5	1	3	4	2	0	0	0
Jim McKenny	5	3	0	3	2	2	1	0
Paul Henderson	5	1	2	3	6	0	0	0
Ron Ellis	5	1	1	2	4	1	0	0
Jim Harrison	5	1	0	1	10	0	0	1
Guy Trottier	4	1	0	1	16	0	0	0
Pierre Jarry	5	0	1	1	0	0	0	0
Bob Baun	5	0	0	0	4	0	0	0
Denis Dupere	5	0	0	0	0	0	0	0
Brian Glennie	5	0	0	0	25	0	0	0
Rick Kehoe	2	0	0	0	2	0	0	0
Rick Ley	5	0	0	0	7	0	0	0
Billy MacMillan	5	0	0	0	0	0	0	0
Donnie Marshall	1	0	0	0	0	0	0	0
Garry Monahan	5	0	0	0	0	0	0	0
Bernie Parent	4	0	0	0	0	0	0	0
Mike Pelyk	5	0	0	0	8	0	0	0
Jacques Plante	1	0	0	0	0	0	0	0
Brad Selwood	5	0	0	0	4	0	0	0
Darryl Sittler	3	0	0	0	2	0	0	0

Goaltending

Player	MIN	GP	W	L	GA	GAA	SO
Bernie Parent	243	4	1	3	13	3.21	0
Jacques Plante	60	1	0	1	5	5.00	0
Team:	303	5	1	4	18	3.56	0

== Transactions ==
The Maple Leafs have been involved in the following transactions during the 1971–72 season.

=== Trades ===
August 20, 1971	To Detroit Red Wings Brian Conacher	To Toronto Maple Leafs Cash
August 30, 1971	To Montreal Canadiens Cash	To Toronto Maple Leafs Terry Clancy
September 27, 1971	To Vancouver Canucks Doug Brindley	To Toronto Maple Leafs Andre Hinse
February 20, 1972	To New York Rangers Jim Dorey	To Toronto Maple Leafs Pierre Jarry

=== Intra-league draft ===
June 5, 1972	From Montreal Canadiens Larry Pleau
June 5, 1972	To Montreal Canadiens Brad Selwood
June 5, 1972	To Vancouver Canucks Gerry O'Flaherty

=== Expansion draft ===
June 6, 1972	To Atlanta Flames Billy MacMillan
June 6, 1972	To New York Islanders Brian Marchinko
June 6, 1972	To New York Islanders Brian Spencer

=== Reverse draft ===
June 8, 1972	To California Golden Seals Marv Edwards

=== Free agents ===
Player	Former team
Lyle Moffat	Undrafted Free Agent
Joe Lundrigan	Undrafted Free Agent
Gord McRae	Undrafted Free Agent

== Draft picks ==
Toronto's draft picks at the 1971 NHL amateur draft held at the Queen Elizabeth Hotel in Montreal.

Round	#	Player	Nationality	College/Junior/Club team (League)
2	22	Rick Kehoe	Canada	Hamilton Red Wings (OHA)
2	23	Dave Fortier	Canada	St. Catharines Black Hawks (OHA)
3	30	Ralph Hopiavuori	Canada	Toronto Marlboros (OHA)
3	37	Gavin Kirk	Canada	Toronto Marlboros (OHA)
4	51	Rick Cunningham	Canada	Peterborough Petes (OHA)
5	65	Bob Sykes	Canada	Sudbury Wolves (NOHA)
6	79	Mike Ruest	Canada	Cornwall Royals (QMJHL)
7	93	Dale Smedsmo	United States	Bemidji State University (WCHA)
7	98	Steve Johnson	Canada	Verdun Maple Leafs (QMJHL)
8	107	Bob Burns	Canada	Royal Military College (CIAU)

== See also ==
- 1971–72 NHL season
