= Al Simmons (disambiguation) =

Al Simmons (1902–1956) was an American baseball player.

Al Simmons may also refer to:

- Al Simmons (musician) (born 1948), Canadian musician
- Al Simmons (ice hockey) (1951–2024), Canadian ice hockey player
- Al Simmons, real name of Spawn, an Image Comics character
