= 1971–72 Detroit Red Wings season =

Sports season

1971–72 Detroit Red Wings
- Division: 5th East
- 1971–72 record: 33–35–10
- Home record: 25–11–3
- Road record: 8–24–7
- Goals for: 261
- Goals against: 262

Team information
- General manager: Ned Harkness
- Coach: Doug Barkley; Johnny Wilson
- Captain: Alex Delvecchio
- Alternate captains: Gary Bergman; Red Berenson; Arnie Brown
- Arena: Olympia Stadium
- Minor league affiliate: Fort Worth Wings (CHL)

Team leaders
- Goals: Mickey Redmond (42)
- Assists: Marcel Dionne (49)
- Points: Marcel Dionne (77)
- Penalty minutes: Gary Bergman (138)
- Wins: Al Smith (18)
- Goals against average: Joe Daley (3.15)

The 1971–72 Detroit Red Wings season was Marcel Dionne's rookie season. The Red Wings placed fifth to miss the playoffs for the second year in a row for the first time since the 1967–68 season and the 1968–69 season.

== Regular season ==
Head coach Doug Barkley won just 3 of the first 11 games before being replaced by Johnny Wilson.

During his first season for Detroit in 1971–72, Marcel Dionne set an NHL record for scoring by a rookie with 77 points. This record has since been surpassed.

=== Season standings ===
East Division
		GP	W	L	T	GF	GA	DIFF	Pts
1	Boston Bruins	78	54	13	11	330	204	+126	119
2	New York Rangers	78	48	17	13	317	192	+125	109
3	Montreal Canadiens	78	46	16	16	307	205	+102	108
4	Toronto Maple Leafs	78	33	31	14	209	208	+1	80
5	Detroit Red Wings	78	33	35	10	261	262	−1	76
6	Buffalo Sabres	78	16	43	19	203	289	−86	51
7	Vancouver Canucks	78	20	50	8	203	297	−94	48

=== Record vs. opponents ===
==== Vs. East Division ====
1971–72 NHL records
Team	BOS	BUF	DET	MTL	NYR	TOR	VAN	Total
Boston	—	3–1–2	5–1	2–3–1	5–1	4–1–1	6–0	25–7–4
Buffalo	1–3–2	—	0–4–2	1–4–1	0–6	1–5	2–3–1	5–25–6
Detroit	1–5	4–0–2	—	3–3	1–4–1	3–3	5–0–1	17–15–4
Montreal	3–2–1	4–1–1	3–3	—	1–3–2	4–1–1	6–0	21–10–5
New York	1–5	6–0	4–1–1	3–1–2	—	2–2–2	5–1	21–10–5
Toronto	1–4–1	5–1	3–3	1–4–1	2–2–2	—	2–2–2	14–16–6
Vancouver	0–6	3–2–1	0–5–1	0–6	1–5	2–2–2	—	6–26–4

==== Vs. West Division ====
1971–72 NHL records
Team	CAL	CHI	LAK	MIN	PHI	PIT	STL	Total
Boston	4–2	4–1–1	4–1–1	5–0–1	6–0	2–1–3	4–1–1	29–6–7
Buffalo	0–3–3	2–3–1	2–3–1	2–2–2	2–2–2	2–1–3	1–4–1	11–18–13
Detroit	2–2–2	0–5–1	3–2–1	2–4	3–2–1	4–2	2–3–1	16–20–6
Montreal	3–0–3	2–1–3	5–0–1	4–1–1	3–2–1	4–1–1	4–1–1	25–6–11
New York	4–1–1	2–1–3	6–0	1–3–2	6–0	3–1–2	5–1	27–7–8
Toronto	3–2–1	0–4–2	4–1–1	2–2–2	2–2–2	4–2	4–2	19–15–8
Vancouver	4–2	2–3–1	0–5–1	2–3–1	1–5	2–4	3–2–1	14–24–4

== Schedule and results ==
1971–72 regular season
October

Game	Result	Date	Score	Opponent	Record
1	L	October 9, 1971	2–4	Minnesota North Stars (1971–72)	0–1–0
2	L	October 10, 1971	1–2	@ Chicago Black Hawks (1971–72)	0–2–0
3	L	October 16, 1971	2–9	@ St. Louis Blues (1971–72)	0–3–0
4	W	October 17, 1971	5–3	St. Louis Blues (1971–72)	1–3–0
5	L	October 20, 1971	3–4	@ Boston Bruins (1971–72)	1–4–0
6	W	October 22, 1971	5–2	Toronto Maple Leafs (1971–72)	2–4–0
7	L	October 24, 1971	3–6	California Golden Seals (1971–72)	2–5–0
8	L	October 26, 1971	2–5	Chicago Black Hawks (1971–72)	2–6–0
9	L	October 27, 1971	4–7	@ New York Rangers (1971–72)	2–7–0
10	L	October 30, 1971	0–3	@ Montreal Canadiens (1971–72)	2–8–0
11	W	October 31, 1971	3–1	Pittsburgh Penguins (1971–72)	3–8–0

November

Game	Result	Date	Score	Opponent	Record
12	L	November 1, 1971	1–6	@ Toronto Maple Leafs (1971–72)	3–9–0
13	T	November 4, 1971	4–4	Buffalo Sabres (1971–72)	3–9–1
14	L	November 6, 1971	1–2	Boston Bruins (1971–72)	3–10–1
15	T	November 7, 1971	3–3	@ Buffalo Sabres (1971–72)	3–10–2
16	W	November 10, 1971	2–1	@ Minnesota North Stars (1971–72)	4–10–2
17	W	November 13, 1971	6–3	@ Philadelphia Flyers (1971–72)	5–10–2
18	T	November 16, 1971	2–2	@ St. Louis Blues (1971–72)	5–10–3
19	L	November 20, 1971	1–3	@ Los Angeles Kings (1971–72)	5–11–3
20	T	November 21, 1971	2–2	@ Vancouver Canucks (1971–72)	5–11–4
21	L	November 24, 1971	1–6	@ California Golden Seals (1971–72)	5–12–4
22	W	November 27, 1971	3–1	New York Rangers (1971–72)	6–12–4
23	W	November 28, 1971	4–2	Montreal Canadiens (1971–72)	7–12–4

December

Game	Result	Date	Score	Opponent	Record
24	L	December 1, 1971	2–4	@ Pittsburgh Penguins (1971–72)	7–13–4
25	T	December 2, 1971	1–1	@ Philadelphia Flyers (1971–72)	7–13–5
26	W	December 4, 1971	5–1	Los Angeles Kings (1971–72)	8–13–5
27	L	December 5, 1971	1–2	St. Louis Blues (1971–72)	8–14–5
28	L	December 8, 1971	2–4	@ Montreal Canadiens (1971–72)	8–15–5
29	W	December 11, 1971	6–3	Philadelphia Flyers (1971–72)	9–15–5
30	W	December 14, 1971	4–3	@ Vancouver Canucks (1971–72)	10–15–5
31	T	December 17, 1971	3–3	@ California Golden Seals (1971–72)	10–15–6
32	L	December 18, 1971	2–4	@ Los Angeles Kings (1971–72)	10–16–6
33	W	December 22, 1971	3–0	Vancouver Canucks (1971–72)	11–16–6
34	L	December 25, 1971	3–5	@ Toronto Maple Leafs (1971–72)	11–17–6
35	W	December 26, 1971	5–1	Minnesota North Stars (1971–72)	12–17–6
36	W	December 29, 1971	7–3	@ Buffalo Sabres (1971–72)	13–17–6
37	W	December 31, 1971	6–3	California Golden Seals (1971–72)	14–17–6

January

Game	Result	Date	Score	Opponent	Record
38	W	January 2, 1972	6–4	Montreal Canadiens (1971–72)	15–17–6
39	L	January 5, 1972	2–4	@ Minnesota North Stars (1971–72)	15–18–6
40	T	January 7, 1972	4–4	@ California Golden Seals (1971–72)	15–18–7
41	W	January 9, 1972	4–2	Pittsburgh Penguins (1971–72)	16–18–7
42	W	January 11, 1972	5–0	Philadelphia Flyers (1971–72)	17–18–7
43	W	January 15, 1972	7–4	Los Angeles Kings (1971–72)	18–18–7
44	L	January 16, 1972	2–9	@ Boston Bruins (1971–72)	18–19–7
45	L	January 19, 1972	1–4	Minnesota North Stars (1971–72)	18–20–7
46	W	January 22, 1972	3–2	Buffalo Sabres (1971–72)	19–20–7
47	W	January 23, 1972	3–1	St. Louis Blues (1971–72)	20–20–7
48	W	January 27, 1972	3–1	@ Buffalo Sabres (1971–72)	21–20–7
49	T	January 29, 1972	4–4	Los Angeles Kings (1971–72)	21–20–8
50	L	January 30, 1972	2–4	@ Chicago Black Hawks (1971–72)	21–21–8

February

Game	Result	Date	Score	Opponent	Record
51	W	February 1, 1972	4–0	Toronto Maple Leafs (1971–72)	22–21–8
52	L	February 3, 1972	4–5	@ Philadelphia Flyers (1971–72)	22–22–8
53	L	February 5, 1972	2–3	@ Boston Bruins (1971–72)	22–23–8
54	W	February 6, 1972	8–2	California Golden Seals (1971–72)	23–23–8
55	W	February 10, 1972	4–2	Buffalo Sabres (1971–72)	24–23–8
56	T	February 12, 1972	3–3	Chicago Black Hawks (1971–72)	24–23–9
57	L	February 16, 1972	2–4	@ Minnesota North Stars (1971–72)	24–24–9
58	W	February 19, 1972	6–2	@ Pittsburgh Penguins (1971–72)	25–24–9
59	L	February 20, 1972	3–4	@ New York Rangers (1971–72)	25–25–9
60	W	February 22, 1972	5–4	Toronto Maple Leafs (1971–72)	26–25–9
61	W	February 24, 1972	2–0	Vancouver Canucks (1971–72)	27–25–9
62	L	February 26, 1972	1–8	@ Montreal Canadiens (1971–72)	27–26–9
63	L	February 27, 1972	1–3	Philadelphia Flyers (1971–72)	27–27–9
64	W	February 29, 1972	8–2	Vancouver Canucks (1971–72)	28–27–9

March

Game	Result	Date	Score	Opponent	Record
65	L	March 2, 1972	4–7	@ Pittsburgh Penguins (1971–72)	28–28–9
66	L	March 4, 1972	4–5	Boston Bruins (1971–72)	28–29–9
67	W	March 5, 1972	6–3	Pittsburgh Penguins (1971–72)	29–29–9
68	L	March 8, 1972	1–5	@ Toronto Maple Leafs (1971–72)	29–30–9
69	L	March 11, 1972	2–4	New York Rangers (1971–72)	29–31–9
70	L	March 12, 1972	2–3	Chicago Black Hawks (1971–72)	29–32–9
71	L	March 16, 1972	1–2	New York Rangers (1971–72)	29–33–9
72	W	March 19, 1972	7–6	Montreal Canadiens (1971–72)	30–33–9
73	W	March 21, 1972	7–5	@ Vancouver Canucks (1971–72)	31–33–9
74	W	March 22, 1972	6–3	@ Los Angeles Kings (1971–72)	32–33–9
75	L	March 25, 1972	3–5	@ St. Louis Blues (1971–72)	32–34–9
76	W	March 28, 1972	6–3	Boston Bruins (1971–72)	33–34–9
77	T	March 29, 1972	2–2	@ New York Rangers (1971–72)	33–34–10

April

Game	Result	Date	Score	Opponent	Record
78	L	April 2, 1972	1–6	@ Chicago Black Hawks (1971–72)	33–35–10

Legend: Win (2 points) Loss (0 points) Tie (1 point)

== Player statistics ==
=== Forwards ===
Note: GP = Games played; G = Goals; A = Assists; Pts = Points; PIM = Penalty minutes

Player	GP	G	A	Pts	PIM
Marcel Dionne	78	28	49	77	14
Mickey Redmond	78	42	29	71	34
Red Berenson	78	28	41	69	16
Alex Delvecchio	75	20	45	65	22
Nick Libett	77	31	22	53	50
Tim Ecclestone	72	18	35	53	33
Bill Collins	71	15	25	40	38
Al Karlander	71	15	20	35	29
Leon Rochefort	64	17	12	29	10
Guy Charron	64	9	16	25	14
Doug Volmar	39	9	5	14	8
Dan Johnson	43	2	5	7	8
Ab McDonald	19	2	3	5	0
Brian Conacher	22	3	1	4	4

=== Defensemen ===
Note: GP = Games played; G = Goals; A = Assists; Pts = Points; PIM = Penalty minutes

Player	GP	G	A	Pts	PIM
Gary Bergman	75	6	31	37	138
Ron Stackhouse	73	5	25	30	83
Arnie Brown	77	2	23	25	84
Larry Johnston	65	4	20	24	111
Ron Harris	61	1	10	11	80
Bob Wall	45	2	4	6	9

=== Goaltending ===
Note: GP = Games played; W = Wins; L = Losses; T = Ties; SO = Shutouts; GA = Goals against; GAA = Goals against average

Player	GP	MIN	W	L	T	SO	GA	GAA
Andy Brown	10	560	4	5	1	0	37	3.96
Joe Daley	29	1620	11	10	5	0	85	3.15
Al Smith	43	2500	18	20	4	4	135	3.24

== Awards and records ==
- Marcel Dionne, NHL record (since broken), Most points by a rookie with 77 points.

== Transactions ==
The Red Wings were involved in the following transactions during the 1971–72 season:

=== Trades ===
October 22, 1971	To Detroit Red Wings Ron Stackhouse	To California Golden Seals Tom Webster
January 13, 1971	To Detroit Red Wings Mickey Redmond; Guy Charron; Bill Collins	To Montreal Canadiens Frank Mahovlich

== Draft picks ==
Round	Pick	Player	Position	School/Club team
1	2	Marcel Dionne	Center	St. Catharines Black Hawks (OHA)
2	16	Henry Boucha	Center	US National Development Team
4	44	George Hulme	Goaltender	St. Catharines Black Hawks (OHA)
5	58	Earl Anderson	Right wing	University of North Dakota (WCHA)
6	72	Charlie Shaw	Defense	Toronto Marlboros (OHA)
7	86	Jim Nahrgang	Defense	Michigan Tech University (NCAA)
8	100	Bob Boyd	Defense	Michigan State University (NCAA)

== See also ==
- 1972 in Michigan
