= 1971–72 Minnesota North Stars season =

National Hockey League team season

1971–72 Minnesota North Stars
- Division: 2nd West
- 1971–72 record: 37–29–12
- Home record: 22–11–6
- Road record: 15–18–6
- Goals for: 212
- Goals against: 191

Team information
- General manager: Wren Blair
- Coach: Jack Gordon
- Captain: Ted Harris
- Alternate captains: J. P. Parise; Barry Gibbs; Charlie Burns
- Arena: Met Center

Team leaders
- Goals: Bill Goldsworthy (31)
- Assists: Jude Drouin (43)
- Points: Bill Goldsworthy (62)
- Penalty minutes: Barry Gibbs (128)
- Wins: Cesare Maniago (20)
- Goals against average: Gump Worsley (2.12)

The 1971–72 Minnesota North Stars season was the Stars' fifth season of operation in the National Hockey League (NHL). The Stars finished in second place in the West Division and qualified for the playoffs, where they lost in the first round to the St. Louis Blues.

== Regular season ==
=== Final standings ===
West Division
		GP	W	L	T	GF	GA	DIFF	Pts
1	Chicago Black Hawks	78	46	17	15	256	166	+90	107
2	Minnesota North Stars	78	37	29	12	212	191	+21	86
3	St. Louis Blues	78	28	39	11	208	247	−39	67
4	Pittsburgh Penguins	78	26	38	14	220	258	−38	66
5	Philadelphia Flyers	78	26	38	14	200	236	−36	66
6	California Golden Seals	78	21	39	18	216	288	−72	60
7	Los Angeles Kings	78	20	49	9	206	305	−99	49

=== Record vs. opponents ===
==== Vs. West Division ====
1971–72 NHL records
Team	CAL	CHI	LAK	MIN	PHI	PIT	STL	Total
California	—	1–4–1	3–2–1	1–4–1	2–4	2–2–2	0–3–3	9–19–8
Chicago	4–1–1	—	5–1	5–1	3–2–1	5–0–1	6–0	28–5–3
Los Angeles	2–3–1	1–5	—	0–6	2–3–1	1–4–1	2–4	8–25–3
Minnesota	4–1–1	1–5	6–0	—	3–1–2	4–2	4–2	22–11–3
Philadelphia	4–2	2–3–1	3–2–1	1–3–2	—	2–3–1	1–2–3	13–15–8
Pittsburgh	2–2–2	0–5–1	4–1–1	2–4	3–2–1	—	3–3	14–17–5
St. Louis	3–0–3	0–6	4–2	2–4	2–1–3	3–3	—	14–16–6

==== Vs. East Division ====
1971–72 NHL records
Team	BOS	BUF	DET	MTL	NYR	TOR	VAN	Total
California	2–4	3–0–3	2–2–2	0–3–3	1–4–1	2–3–1	2–4	12–20–10
Chicago	1–4–1	3–2–1	5–0–1	1–2–3	1–2–3	4–0–2	3–2–1	18–12–12
Los Angeles	1–4–1	3–2–1	2–3–1	0–5–1	0–6	1–4–1	5–0–1	12–24–6
Minnesota	0–5–1	2–2–2	4–2	1–4–1	3–1–2	2–2–2	3–2–1	15–18–9
Philadelphia	0–6	2–2–2	2–3–1	2–3–1	0–6	2–2–2	5–1	13–23–6
Pittsburgh	1–2–3	1–2–3	2–4	1–4–1	1–3–2	2–4	4–2	12–21–9
St. Louis	1–4–1	4–1–1	3–2–1	1–4–1	1–5	2–4	2–3–1	14–23–5

== Playoffs ==
For the fourth time in their first five seasons, the North Stars were in the playoffs. Once again, they had a matchup with the Blues in the postseason. The two teams would not meet again in the postseason until 1984.

== Schedule and results ==
=== Regular season ===
1971–72 regular season
October

Game	Result	Date	Score	Opponent	Record
1	W	October 9, 1971	4–2	@ Detroit Red Wings (1971–72)	1–0–0
2	T	October 14, 1971	1–1	Montreal Canadiens (1971–72)	1–0–1
3	L	October 16, 1971	2–3	Chicago Black Hawks (1971–72)	1–1–1
4	W	October 17, 1971	3–2	@ Buffalo Sabres (1971–72)	2–1–1
5	W	October 20, 1971	7–0	Vancouver Canucks (1971–72)	3–1–1
6	W	October 23, 1971	5–1	Buffalo Sabres (1971–72)	4–1–1
7	W	October 24, 1971	6–3	@ Los Angeles Kings (1971–72)	5–1–1
8	W	October 27, 1971	2–1	@ St. Louis Blues (1971–72)	6–1–1
9	W	October 28, 1971	2–0	Pittsburgh Penguins (1971–72)	7–1–1
10	T	October 30, 1971	1–1	@ Toronto Maple Leafs (1971–72)	7–1–2
11	L	October 31, 1971	2–5	@ Boston Bruins (1971–72)	7–2–2

November

Game	Result	Date	Score	Opponent	Record
12	W	November 3, 1971	2–1	Toronto Maple Leafs (1971–72)	8–2–2
13	W	November 6, 1971	5–1	St. Louis Blues (1971–72)	9–2–2
14	W	November 7, 1971	3–0	@ Philadelphia Flyers (1971–72)	10–2–2
15	L	November 10, 1971	1–2	Detroit Red Wings (1971–72)	10–3–2
16	L	November 13, 1971	1–5	Montreal Canadiens (1971–72)	10–4–2
17	W	November 16, 1971	5–1	@ Pittsburgh Penguins (1971–72)	11–4–2
18	W	November 18, 1971	4–3	Pittsburgh Penguins (1971–72)	12–4–2
19	W	November 20, 1971	4–1	New York Rangers (1971–72)	13–4–2
20	T	November 21, 1971	1–1	@ Philadelphia Flyers (1971–72)	13–4–3
21	W	November 23, 1971	2–1	@ Vancouver Canucks (1971–72)	14–4–3
22	W	November 26, 1971	2–1	@ California Golden Seals (1971–72)	15–4–3
23	W	November 27, 1971	3–1	@ Los Angeles Kings (1971–72)	16–4–3

December

Game	Result	Date	Score	Opponent	Record
24	W	December 1, 1971	4–1	California Golden Seals (1971–72)	17–4–3
25	W	December 4, 1971	3–1	Philadelphia Flyers (1971–72)	18–4–3
26	L	December 5, 1971	1–3	@ Buffalo Sabres (1971–72)	18–5–3
27	L	December 8, 1971	1–3	@ Toronto Maple Leafs (1971–72)	18–6–3
28	L	December 11, 1971	3–4	@ Montreal Canadiens (1971–72)	18–7–3
29	L	December 12, 1971	3–5	@ Chicago Black Hawks (1971–72)	18–8–3
30	W	December 15, 1971	4–1	St. Louis Blues (1971–72)	19–8–3
31	L	December 18, 1971	1–4	Chicago Black Hawks (1971–72)	19–9–3
32	T	December 19, 1971	1–1	@ New York Rangers (1971–72)	19–9–4
33	W	December 21, 1971	3–2	Los Angeles Kings (1971–72)	20–9–4
34	L	December 25, 1971	1–2	New York Rangers (1971–72)	20–10–4
35	L	December 26, 1971	1–5	@ Detroit Red Wings (1971–72)	20–11–4
36	T	December 30, 1971	2–2	Boston Bruins (1971–72)	20–11–5

January

Game	Result	Date	Score	Opponent	Record
37	W	January 1, 1972	3–2	@ Los Angeles Kings (1971–72)	21–11–5
38	W	January 5, 1972	4–2	Detroit Red Wings (1971–72)	22–11–5
39	L	January 8, 1972	1–5	Vancouver Canucks (1971–72)	22–12–5
40	T	January 11, 1972	2–2	@ Vancouver Canucks (1971–72)	22–12–6
41	L	January 12, 1972	0–2	@ California Golden Seals (1971–72)	22–13–6
42	L	January 15, 1972	2–7	@ St. Louis Blues (1971–72)	22–14–6
43	L	January 16, 1972	2–3	@ Chicago Black Hawks (1971–72)	22–15–6
44	T	January 18, 1972	1–1	California Golden Seals (1971–72)	22–15–7
45	W	January 19, 1972	4–1	@ Detroit Red Wings (1971–72)	23–15–7
46	W	January 22, 1972	4–1	Toronto Maple Leafs (1971–72)	24–15–7
47	W	January 23, 1972	5–3	Los Angeles Kings (1971–72)	25–15–7
48	W	January 27, 1972	6–5	@ Montreal Canadiens (1971–72)	26–15–7
49	W	January 29, 1972	4–2	New York Rangers (1971–72)	27–15–7
50	T	January 30, 1972	1–1	@ New York Rangers (1971–72)	27–15–8

February

Game	Result	Date	Score	Opponent	Record
51	L	February 2, 1972	2–3	@ Toronto Maple Leafs (1971–72)	27–16–8
52	L	February 3, 1972	1–6	@ Boston Bruins (1971–72)	27–17–8
53	T	February 5, 1972	3–3	Buffalo Sabres (1971–72)	27–17–9
54	L	February 6, 1972	0–5	@ Chicago Black Hawks (1971–72)	27–18–9
55	W	February 9, 1972	4–1	Los Angeles Kings (1971–72)	28–18–9
56	W	February 10, 1972	3–1	@ St. Louis Blues (1971–72)	29–18–9
57	W	February 12, 1972	5–1	Philadelphia Flyers (1971–72)	30–18–9
58	W	February 16, 1972	4–2	Detroit Red Wings (1971–72)	31–18–9
59	L	February 19, 1972	4–6	Boston Bruins (1971–72)	31–19–9
60	W	February 20, 1972	2–0	Pittsburgh Penguins (1971–72)	32–19–9
61	L	February 24, 1972	2–4	Montreal Canadiens (1971–72)	32–20–9
62	L	February 26, 1972	2–3	St. Louis Blues (1971–72)	32–21–9

March

Game	Result	Date	Score	Opponent	Record
63	L	March 2, 1972	0–3	@ Philadelphia Flyers (1971–72)	32–22–9
64	L	March 4, 1972	2–4	@ Pittsburgh Penguins (1971–72)	32–23–9
65	W	March 5, 1972	2–1	Chicago Black Hawks (1971–72)	33–23–9
66	L	March 8, 1972	4–5	Boston Bruins (1971–72)	33–24–9
67	T	March 12, 1972	2–2	Toronto Maple Leafs (1971–72)	33–24–10
68	L	March 14, 1972	3–4	Buffalo Sabres (1971–72)	33–25–10
69	W	March 16, 1972	6–2	Vancouver Canucks (1971–72)	34–25–10
70	L	March 18, 1972	3–4	@ Montreal Canadiens (1971–72)	34–26–10
71	L	March 19, 1972	3–7	@ Boston Bruins (1971–72)	34–27–10
72	W	March 21, 1972	4–2	California Golden Seals (1971–72)	35–27–10
73	T	March 23, 1972	4–4	@ Buffalo Sabres (1971–72)	35–27–11
74	L	March 25, 1972	2–3	@ Pittsburgh Penguins (1971–72)	35–28–11
75	W	March 26, 1972	5–0	@ New York Rangers (1971–72)	36–28–11
76	T	March 28, 1972	2–2	Philadelphia Flyers (1971–72)	36–28–12
77	W	March 31, 1972	2–1	@ California Golden Seals (1971–72)	37–28–12

April

Game	Result	Date	Score	Opponent	Record
78	L	April 2, 1972	1–4	@ Vancouver Canucks (1971–72)	37–29–12

Legend: Win (2 points) Loss (0 points) Tie (1 point)

=== Playoffs ===
1972 Stanley Cup playoffs
Quarterfinals vs. (W3) St. Louis Blues – Blues win 4–3

Game	Result	Date	Score	Opponent	Series
1	W	April 5, 1972	3–0	St. Louis Blues	North Stars lead 1–0
2	W	April 6, 1972	6–5 (OT)	St. Louis Blues	North Stars lead 2–0
3	L	April 8, 1972	1–2	@ St. Louis Blues	North Stars lead 2–1
4	L	April 9, 1972	2–3	@ St. Louis Blues	Series tied 2–2
5	W	April 13, 1972	4–3	St. Louis Blues	North Stars lead 3–2
6	L	April 15, 1972	2–4	@ St. Louis Blues	Series tied 3–3
7	L	April 18, 1972	1–2 (OT)	St. Louis Blues	Blues win 4–3

Legend: Win Loss

== Draft picks ==
Minnesota's draft picks at the 1971 NHL amateur draft held at the Queen Elizabeth Hotel in Montreal.

Round	#	Player	Nationality	College/Junior/Club team (League)
2	21	Rod Norrish	Canada	Regina Pats (WCHL)
3	35	Ron Wilson	Canada	Flin Flon Bombers (WCHL)
4	49	Mike Legge	Canada	Winnipeg Jets (WCHL)
5	63	Brian McBratney	Canada	St. Catharines Black Hawks (OHA)
6	77	Alan Globensky	Canada	Montreal Junior Canadiens (OHA)
7	91	Bruce Abbey	Canada	Peterborough Petes (OHA)
8	105	Russ Friesen	Canada	Hamilton Red Wings (OHA)
12	113	Mike Antonovich	United States	University of Minnesota (WCHA)
15	117	Richard Coutu	Canada	Rosemont National (QMJHL)

== See also ==
- 1971–72 NHL season
