= Kerry Bond =

Canadian ice hockey player

- Born: July 18, 1945 (age 80) Sudbury, Ontario, Canada
- Died: December 11, 2018
- Height: 6 ft 0 in (183 cm)
- Weight: 190 lb (86 kg; 13 st 8 lb)
- Position: Left wing
- Shot: Left
- Played for: WHA; Indianapolis Racers
- NHL draft: Undrafted
- Playing career: 1965–1978

John Kerry Bond (July 18, 1945 – December 11, 2018) was a professional ice hockey forward, most notably for the Indianapolis Racers of the World Hockey Association.

== Career statistics ==
			Regular season					Playoffs
Season	Team	League	GP	G	A	Pts	PIM	GP	G	A	Pts	PIM
1962–63	Peterborough Petes	OHA	27	3	6	9	0
1963–64	Montreal Junior Canadiens	OHA	3	0	0	0	0
1965–66	St. Catharines Black Hawks	OHA	41	20	21	41	156
1965–66	St. Louis Braves	CHL	-	-	-	-	-	3	0	0	0	0
1966–67	St. Louis Braves	CHL	1	0	0	0	0	-	-	-	-	-
1966–67	Columbus Checkers	IHL	66	36	38	74	183	-	-	-	-	-
1966–67	Portland Buckaroos	WHL	-	-	-	-	-	2	0	0	0	0
1967–68	Dallas Black Hawks	CHL	57	11	15	26	63	4	2	1	3	24
1968–69	Dallas Black Hawks	CHL	51	10	21	31	60	11	3	4	7	16
1969–70	Dallas Black Hawks	CHL	69	20	27	47	92	-	-	-	-	-
1970–71	Denver Spurs	WHL	59	19	11	30	46	5	1	1	2	15
1971–72	Phoenix Roadrunners	WHL	60	20	11	31	96	6	1	0	1	6
1972–73	New Haven Nighthawks	AHL	64	19	17	36	65	-	-	-	-	-
1972–73	Boston Braves	AHL	3	0	1	1	6	-	-	-	-	-
1973–74	Phoenix Roadrunners	WHL	9	3	4	7	7	-	-	-	-	-
1973–74	San Diego Gulls	WHL	65	32	31	63	63	4	1	2	3	8
1974–75	Indianapolis Racers	WHA	71	22	15	37	23	-	-	-	-	-
1975–76	Mohawk Valley Comets	NAHL	55	18	23	41	105	-	-	-	-	-
1975–76	Indianapolis Racers	WHA	15	2	0	2	9	7	1	0	1	11
1976–77	Mohawk Valley Comets	NAHL	51	20	35	55	66	-	-	-	-	-
1977–78	Phoenix Roadrunners	PHL	37	3	15	18	72	-	-	-	-	-
WHA totals			86	24	15	39	32	7	1	0	1	11
