= Lyle Carter =

Canadian ice hockey and softball player

- Born: April 29, 1945 (age 79); Truro, Nova Scotia, Canada
- Height: 6 ft 1 in (185 cm)
- Weight: 188 lb (85 kg; 13 st 6 lb)
- Position: Goaltender
- Caught: Left
- Played for: California Golden Seals
- Playing career: 1967–1975

Lyle Dwight Carter (born April 29, 1945) is a Canadian former professional hockey goalie. He played 15 games in the National Hockey League with the California Golden Seals during the 1971–72 season. The rest of his career, which lasted from 1967 to 1975, was spent in various minor leagues. He was also an all-Canadian softball player.

== Playing career ==
Born in Truro, Nova Scotia and raised in Brookfield, Carter began playing professional hockey in 1967–68, appearing in one game for the Toledo Blades in the IHL and two more with the Cleveland Barons. The following season, he played 72 regular games and a further 15 playoff games for the Clinton Comets of the Eastern Hockey League. The following he spent split between the Comets and the Montreal Voyageurs of the AHL, appearing in 5 games for each team.

A member of the IHL's Muskegon Mohawks in 1970–1, Carter won the James Gatschene Memorial Trophy as the league's most valuable and most sportsmanlike as well as the James Norris Memorial Trophy as the goaltender with the best goals against average, as he posted a 2.43 GA and 6 shutouts in 51 games. He also appeared in one game for the Voyageurs, allowing 5 goals in two periods.

Carter played for four teams in 1971–2, seeing his first and only NHL action. He played in 15 games that season for the California Golden Seals, allowing 50 goals in 721 minutes played for a 4.16 GAA. He won 4 of 11 games, not bad for a team that won just 21 of 78 games for the season. He also played 9 games for the WHL's Salt Lake Golden Eagles, 6 for the AHL's Baltimore Clippers, and 5 play-off games for the CHL's Oklahoma City Blazers.

Carter played exclusively for Salt Lake in 1972–3, posting 16–13–6 for a win-lose-tie record in 35 games and recording a 3.58 GA, 0.894 save percentage, and one shutout. The season he posted very solid numbers for the New Haven Nighthawks of the AHL, a 2.97 GA, 0.911 SV% and one shutout in 37 games. He also appeared in 10 playoff games for the Nighthawks. Carter's final year in pro hockey was 1974–5, when he appeared in 4 games for the Greensboro Generals of the SHL and 32 games with the AHL's Syracuse Eagles, where his numbers were not as good, a 5.11 GA in 32 games.

Carter was also an all-Canadian third baseman on four occasions as his club, the Brookfield Elks, advanced to the Canadian Softball Championships. He was a ten time Mainland Fastball League batting champion in Nova Scotia. He was elected to the Nova Scotia Sport Hall of Fame in 1984.

== Career statistics ==
=== Regular season and playoffs ===
			Regular season									Playoffs
Season	Team	League	GP	W	L	T	MIN	GA	SO	GAA	SV%	GP	W	L	MIN	GA	SO	GAA	SV%
1962–63	Brampton 7-Ups	MTJHL	11	—	—	—	640	52	0	4.88	—	—	—	—	—	—	—	—	—
1962–63	Windsor Maple Leafs	NSSHL	12	—	—	—	720	77	0	6.24	—	—	—	—	—	—	—	—	—
1963–64	Buchans Miners	Nfld-Sr	20	15	5	0	1200	69	0	3.45	—	11	6	5	660	59	0	5.36	—
1964–65	New Glasgow Rangers	NSSHL	45	—	—	—	2700	172	0	3.76	—	—	—	—	—	—	—	—	—
1965–66	Orillia Pepsi Colas	OHA-Sr	—	—	—	—	—	—	—	—	—	—	—	—	—	—	—	—	—
1966–67	Gander Flyers	Nfld-Sr	40	26	12	1	2350	152	0	3.88	—	10	5	5	620	43	0	4.16	—
1966–67	Conception Bay CeeBees	Nfld-Sr	—	—	—	—	—	—	—	—	—	2	0	1	79	3	0	2.28	—
1967–68	Cleveland Barons	AHL	2	—	—	—	120	12	0	6.00	—	—	—	—	—	—	—	—	—
1967–68	Toledo Blades	IHL	1	1	0	0	60	4	0	4.00	—	—	—	—	—	—	—	—	—
1968–69	Clinton Comets	EHL	72	44	18	10	4320	169	13	2.35	—	15	8	7	900	40	0	2.67	—
1969–70	Montreal Voyageurs	AHL	5	—	—	—	154	8	0	3.12	—	—	—	—	—	—	—	—	—
1969–70	Clinton Comets	EHL	5	—	—	—	300	11	3	2.20	—	—	—	—	—	—	—	—	—
1970–71	Montreal Voyageurs	AHL	1	0	1	0	40	5	0	7.50	—	—	—	—	—	—	—	—	—
1970–71	Muskegon Mohawks	IHL	50	30	15	4	2958	120	6	2.44	—	6	2	4	360	20	0	3.33	—
1971–72	California Golden Seals	NHL	15	4	7	0	721	50	0	4.16	.861	—	—	—	—	—	—	—	—
1971–72	Salt Lake Golden Eagles	WHL	9	4	3	2	538	26	0	2.89	—	—	—	—	—	—	—	—	—
1971–72	Oklahoma City Blazers	CHL	—	—	—	—	—	—	—	—	—	5	2	3	279	18	0	3.87	—
1972–73	Salt Lake Golden Eagles	WHL	35	17	14	4	2009	120	1	3.58	.894	2	2	0	120	7	0	3.50	—
1973–74	New Haven Nighthawks	AHL	37	17	11	6	2034	101	1	2.97	.911	10	4	6	636	33	0	3.11	—
1974–75	Syracuse Eagles	AHL	32	5	20	1	1561	133	0	5.11	.871	—	—	—	—	—	—	—	—
1974–75	Greensboro Generals	SHL	4	—	—	—	216	17	0	4.72	.882	—	—	—	—	—	—	—	—
NHL totals			15	4	7	0	721	50	0	4.16	.861	—	—	—	—	—	—	—	—
