= Al Simmons (ice hockey) =

Canadian ice hockey player (1951–2024)

- Born: September 25, 1951 Winnipeg, Manitoba, Canada
- Died: October 28, 2024 (aged 73) Dublin, Ohio, U.S.
- Height: 6 ft 0 in (183 cm)
- Weight: 170 lb (77 kg; 12 st 2 lb)
- Position: Defence
- Shot: Right
- Played for: Boston Bruins; California Golden Seals
- NHL draft: 85th overall, 1971; California Golden Seals
- Playing career: 1971–1976

Allan Kenneth Simmons (September 25, 1951 – October 28, 2024) was a Canadian professional ice hockey defenceman who played eleven games in the National Hockey League for the California Golden Seals and Boston Bruins between 1972 and 1975. He also played in the minor leagues during his career, from 1971 to 1976. Simmons died in Dublin, Ohio on October 28, 2024, at the age of 73.

== Career statistics ==
=== Regular season and playoffs ===
			Regular season					Playoffs
Season	Team	League	GP	G	A	Pts	PIM	GP	G	A	Pts	PIM
1970–71	Winnipeg Jets	WCHL	65	14	39	53	89	12	3	4	7	22
1971–72	California Golden Seals	NHL	1	0	0	0	0	—	—	—	—	—
1971–72	Columbus Golden Seals	IHL	60	2	12	14	26	—	—	—	—	—
1972–73	Salt Lake Golden Eagles	WHL	72	19	22	41	50	9	1	4	5	6
1973–74	Boston Bruins	NHL	3	0	0	0	0	1	0	0	0	0
1973–74	Boston Braves	AHL	75	5	32	37	41	—	—	—	—	—
1974–75	Rochester Americans	AHL	68	7	36	43	60	12	2	5	7	13
1975–76	Boston Bruins	NHL	7	0	1	1	21	—	—	—	—	—
1975–76	Rochester Americans	AHL	5	0	5	5	13	—	—	—	—	—
1975–76	Providence Reds	AHL	56	2	25	27	48	3	0	2	2	0
AHL totals			204	14	98	112	162	15	2	7	9	13
NHL totals			11	0	1	1	21	1	0	0	0	0
