= 1971–72 Chicago Black Hawks season =

National Hockey League team season

1971–72 Chicago Black Hawks
- West Division champions
- Division: 1st West
- 1971–72 record: 46–17–15
- Home record: 28–3–8
- Road record: 18–14–7
- Goals for: 256
- Goals against: 166

Team information
- General manager: Tommy Ivan
- Coach: Billy Reay
- Captain: Vacant
- Alternate captains: Stan Mikita
- Arena: Chicago Stadium

Team leaders
- Goals: Bobby Hull (50)
- Assists: Pit Martin (51)
- Points: Bobby Hull (93)
- Penalty minutes: Keith Magnuson (201)
- Plus/minus: Bobby Hull (+54)
- Wins: Tony Esposito (31)
- Goals against average: Tony Esposito (1.77)

The 1971–72 Chicago Black Hawks season was the club's 46th season in the National Hockey League, and their second consecutive first-place finish in the NHL West, with 46 victories and 107 points. In the 1972 playoffs, the Black Hawks swept the Pittsburgh Penguins in the quarter-finals before being swept by the New York Rangers in the semi-finals.

== Regular season ==
Chicago had an excellent start to the season, winning their opening five games, and never let up throughout the season, as they had an unbeaten streak of ten games in December to take control of the West Division. The Black Hawks finish the season with a twelve-game unbeaten streak to win their third straight divisional title, with a record of 46–17–15, tying the club record with 107 points that was set during the 1970–71 season. The Black Hawks finished 21 points ahead of the second place Minnesota North Stars.

Offensively, the Black Hawks were led by Bobby Hull, who scored a team high 50 goals and 93 points, which placed him seventh in league scoring. Hull also led the club with a +54 rating. Pit Martin led the club with 51 assists, and finished second in team scoring with 75 points. Dennis Hull had 30 goals and 69 points, while Stan Mikita was just behind him with 26 goals and 65 points. On defense, Pat Stapleton led the club with 41 points, while Bill White and Doug Jarrett each had 29 points. Keith Magnuson led the team in penalty minutes, as he accumulated 201.

In goal, Tony Esposito led the club with 31 victories and a 1.77 goals against average, along with nine shutouts while appearing in 48 games. Backup goaltender Gary Smith won 14 games with a 2.42 goals against average and five shutouts. They helped the team have a league low 166 goals against, and were awarded the Vezina Trophy for their efforts.

== Season standings ==
West Division
		GP	W	L	T	GF	GA	DIFF	Pts
1	Chicago Black Hawks	78	46	17	15	256	166	+90	107
2	Minnesota North Stars	78	37	29	12	212	191	+21	86
3	St. Louis Blues	78	28	39	11	208	247	−39	67
4	Pittsburgh Penguins	78	26	38	14	220	258	−38	66
5	Philadelphia Flyers	78	26	38	14	200	236	−36	66
6	California Golden Seals	78	21	39	18	216	288	−72	60
7	Los Angeles Kings	78	20	49	9	206	305	−99	49

=== Record vs. opponents ===
==== Vs. West Division ====
1971–72 NHL records
Team	CAL	CHI	LAK	MIN	PHI	PIT	STL	Total
California	—	1–4–1	3–2–1	1–4–1	2–4	2–2–2	0–3–3	9–19–8
Chicago	4–1–1	—	5–1	5–1	3–2–1	5–0–1	6–0	28–5–3
Los Angeles	2–3–1	1–5	—	0–6	2–3–1	1–4–1	2–4	8–25–3
Minnesota	4–1–1	1–5	6–0	—	3–1–2	4–2	4–2	22–11–3
Philadelphia	4–2	2–3–1	3–2–1	1–3–2	—	2–3–1	1–2–3	13–15–8
Pittsburgh	2–2–2	0–5–1	4–1–1	2–4	3–2–1	—	3–3	14–17–5
St. Louis	3–0–3	0–6	4–2	2–4	2–1–3	3–3	—	14–16–6

==== Vs. East Division ====
1971–72 NHL records
Team	BOS	BUF	DET	MTL	NYR	TOR	VAN	Total
California	2–4	3–0–3	2–2–2	0–3–3	1–4–1	2–3–1	2–4	12–20–10
Chicago	1–4–1	3–2–1	5–0–1	1–2–3	1–2–3	4–0–2	3–2–1	18–12–12
Los Angeles	1–4–1	3–2–1	2–3–1	0–5–1	0–6	1–4–1	5–0–1	12–24–6
Minnesota	0–5–1	2–2–2	4–2	1–4–1	3–1–2	2–2–2	3–2–1	15–18–9
Philadelphia	0–6	2–2–2	2–3–1	2–3–1	0–6	2–2–2	5–1	13–23–6
Pittsburgh	1–2–3	1–2–3	2–4	1–4–1	1–3–2	2–4	4–2	12–21–9
St. Louis	1–4–1	4–1–1	3–2–1	1–4–1	1–5	2–4	2–3–1	14–23–5

== Playoffs ==
The Hawks opened the playoffs against the Pittsburgh Penguins, who finished fourth in the West Division with a record of 26–38–14, earning 66 points. The series opened with two games at Chicago Stadium, and the Black Hawks, who had a record of 28–3–8 at home, continued their dominance, as they defeated the Penguins 3–1 and 3–2 to take a 2–0 series lead. The series moved to the Pittsburgh Civic Arena for the next two games, however, it was the Black Hawks who continued to stay hot, as they shutout the Penguins 2–0 in the third game, and finished off the series sweep with a 6–5 overtime win in the fourth game.

Chicago's next opponent was the New York Rangers for the second straight year, who had finished the season with a 48–17–13 record, earning 109 points, and a second-place finish in the East Division. The Rangers defeated the defending Stanley Cup champions, the Montreal Canadiens in their first playoff series. Since the Black Hawks won their division, they were given a home-ice advantage in the series for the second straight year. The series opened up with two games at Chicago Stadium, however, it was the Rangers who struck first, defeating the Hawks 3–2, then taking the second game in Chicago by a score of 5–3 to take an early 2–0 series lead. Chicago did not get themselves back in the series, as New York won the third game 3–2, and the Rangers completed the sweep of the Black Hawks with a 6–2 thumping in the fourth game.

== Schedule and results ==
=== Regular season ===
1971–72 regular season
October

Game	Date	Visitor	Score	Home	Record	Points
1	October 9	Chicago Black Hawks	4–2	St. Louis Blues	1–0–0	2
2	October 10	Detroit Red Wings	1–2	Chicago Black Hawks	2–0–0	4
3	October 13	St. Louis Blues	0–1	Chicago Black Hawks	3–0–0	6
4	October 16	Chicago Black Hawks	3–2	Minnesota North Stars	4–0–0	8
5	October 17	Los Angeles Kings	0–4	Chicago Black Hawks	5–0–0	10
6	October 20	Chicago Black Hawks	1–3	New York Rangers	5–1–0	10
7	October 21	Chicago Black Hawks	5–2	Buffalo Sabres	6–1–0	12
8	October 23	Chicago Black Hawks	5–2	Pittsburgh Penguins	7–1–0	14
9	October 24	Chicago Black Hawks	1–2	Philadelphia Flyers	7–2–0	14
10	October 26	Chicago Black Hawks	5–2	Detroit Red Wings	8–2–0	16
11	October 30	Chicago Black Hawks	5–1	Los Angeles Kings	9–2–0	18
12	October 31	Chicago Black Hawks	2–6	Vancouver Canucks	9–3–0	18

November

Game	Date	Visitor	Score	Home	Record	Points
13	November 3	Philadelphia Flyers	0–3	Chicago Black Hawks	10–3–0	20
14	November 6	Chicago Black Hawks	1–2	Montreal Canadiens	10–4–0	20
15	November 7	Pittsburgh Penguins	1–4	Chicago Black Hawks	11–4–0	22
16	November 10	Boston Bruins	1–3	Chicago Black Hawks	12–4–0	24
17	November 14	California Golden Seals	1–4	Chicago Black Hawks	13–4–0	26
18	November 17	Vancouver Canucks	0–3	Chicago Black Hawks	14–4–0	28
19	November 20	Chicago Black Hawks	1–2	Boston Bruins	14–5–0	28
20	November 21	Pittsburgh Penguins	3–7	Chicago Black Hawks	15–5–0	30
21	November 24	Montreal Canadiens	3–3	Chicago Black Hawks	15–5–1	31
22	November 27	Chicago Black Hawks	3–3	Toronto Maple Leafs	15–5–2	32
23	November 28	Toronto Maple Leafs	1–4	Chicago Black Hawks	16–5–2	34
24	November 30	Chicago Black Hawks	2–4	Vancouver Canucks	16–6–2	34

December

Game	Date	Visitor	Score	Home	Record	Points
25	December 3	Chicago Black Hawks	1–2	California Golden Seals	16–7–2	34
26	December 5	Los Angeles Kings	0–7	Chicago Black Hawks	17–7–2	36
27	December 8	New York Rangers	2–2	Chicago Black Hawks	17–7–3	37
28	December 9	Chicago Black Hawks	3–1	Buffalo Sabres	18–7–3	39
29	December 11	Chicago Black Hawks	3–1	Toronto Maple Leafs	19–7–3	41
30	December 12	Minnesota North Stars	3–5	Chicago Black Hawks	20–7–3	43
31	December 15	Buffalo Sabres	1–2	Chicago Black Hawks	21–7–3	45
32	December 18	Chicago Black Hawks	4–1	Minnesota North Stars	22–7–3	47
33	December 19	St. Louis Blues	0–2	Chicago Black Hawks	23–7–3	49
34	December 22	Chicago Black Hawks	4–1	California Golden Seals	24–7–3	51
35	December 26	Los Angeles Kings	3–6	Chicago Black Hawks	25–7–3	53
36	December 29	Boston Bruins	5–1	Chicago Black Hawks	25–8–3	53

January

Game	Date	Visitor	Score	Home	Record	Points
37	January 2	Philadelphia Flyers	2–6	Chicago Black Hawks	26–8–3	55
38	January 5	Pittsburgh Penguins	3–3	Chicago Black Hawks	26–8–4	56
39	January 8	Chicago Black Hawks	4–0	Pittsburgh Penguins	27–8–4	58
40	January 9	Montreal Canadiens	2–5	Chicago Black Hawks	28–8–4	60
41	January 12	Chicago Black Hawks	5–5	New York Rangers	28–8–5	61
42	January 15	Chicago Black Hawks	2–4	Boston Bruins	28–9–5	61
43	January 16	Minnesota North Stars	2–3	Chicago Black Hawks	29–9–5	63
44	January 19	California Golden Seals	0–2	Chicago Black Hawks	30–9–5	65
45	January 20	Chicago Black Hawks	2–3	Philadelphia Flyers	30–10–5	65
46	January 23	Toronto Maple Leafs	0–4	Chicago Black Hawks	31–10–5	67
47	January 27	Vancouver Canucks	0–4	Chicago Black Hawks	32–10–5	69
48	January 29	Chicago Black Hawks	4–2	Pittsburgh Penguins	33–10–5	71
49	January 30	Detroit Red Wings	2–4	Chicago Black Hawks	34–10–5	73

February

Game	Date	Visitor	Score	Home	Record	Points
50	February 1	Chicago Black Hawks	4–7	Los Angeles Kings	34–11–5	73
51	February 4	Chicago Black Hawks	6–2	Vancouver Canucks	35–11–5	75
52	February 6	Minnesota North Stars	0–5	Chicago Black Hawks	36–11–5	77
53	February 9	Chicago Black Hawks	1–4	New York Rangers	36–12–5	77
54	February 10	Chicago Black Hawks	1–7	Montreal Canadiens	36–13–5	77
55	February 12	Chicago Black Hawks	3–3	Detroit Red Wings	36–13–6	78
56	February 13	Toronto Maple Leafs	1–3	Chicago Black Hawks	37–13–6	80
57	February 15	Chicago Black Hawks	3–2	St. Louis Blues	38–13–6	82
58	February 16	Philadelphia Flyers	3–3	Chicago Black Hawks	38–13–7	83
59	February 20	Boston Bruins	3–1	Chicago Black Hawks	38–14–7	83
60	February 23	Buffalo Sabres	2–1	Chicago Black Hawks	38–15–7	83
61	February 24	Chicago Black Hawks	3–5	Buffalo Sabres	38–16–7	83
62	February 26	California Golden Seals	0–3	Chicago Black Hawks	39–16–7	85
63	February 27	Vancouver Canucks	3–3	Chicago Black Hawks	39–16–8	86

March

Game	Date	Visitor	Score	Home	Record	Points
64	March 1	Chicago Black Hawks	6–4	Los Angeles Kings	40–16–8	88
65	March 3	Chicago Black Hawks	4–4	California Golden Seals	40–16–9	89
66	March 5	Chicago Black Hawks	1–2	Minnesota North Stars	40–17–9	89
67	March 8	Chicago Black Hawks	3–3	New York Rangers	40–17–10	90
68	March 11	Chicago Black Hawks	1–1	Montreal Canadiens	40–17–11	91
69	March 12	Chicago Black Hawks	3–2	Detroit Red Wings	41–17–11	93
70	March 15	New York Rangers	1–3	Chicago Black Hawks	42–17–11	95
71	March 18	Chicago Black Hawks	2–2	Toronto Maple Leafs	42–17–12	96
72	March 19	Buffalo Sabres	3–3	Chicago Black Hawks	42–17–13	97
73	March 23	Chicago Black Hawks	4–2	Philadelphia Flyers	43–17–13	99
74	March 25	Chicago Black Hawks	5–5	Boston Bruins	43–17–14	100
75	March 26	St. Louis Blues	0–4	Chicago Black Hawks	44–17–14	102
76	March 29	Montreal Canadiens	5–5	Chicago Black Hawks	44–17–15	103

April

Game	Date	Visitor	Score	Home	Record	Points
77	April 1	Chicago Black Hawks	2–0	St. Louis Blues	45–17–15	105
78	April 2	Detroit Red Wings	1–6	Chicago Black Hawks	46–17–15	107

Legend: Win (2 points) Loss (0 points) Tie (1 point)

=== Playoffs ===
1972 Stanley Cup playoffs
Quarterfinals vs. (W4) Pittsburgh Penguins – Black Hawks win 4–0

Game	Date	Visitor	Score	Home	Series
1	April 5	Pittsburgh Penguins	1–3	Chicago Black Hawks	1–0
2	April 6	Pittsburgh Penguins	2–3	Chicago Black Hawks	2–0
3	April 8	Chicago Black Hawks	2–0	Pittsburgh Penguins	3–0
4	April 9	Chicago Black Hawks	6–5	Pittsburgh Penguins	4–0

Semifinals vs. (E2) New York Rangers – Rangers win 4–0

Game	Date	Visitor	Score	Home	Series
1	April 16	New York Rangers	3–2	Chicago Black Hawks	0–1
2	April 18	New York Rangers	5–3	Chicago Black Hawks	0–2
3	April 20	Chicago Black Hawks	2–3	New York Rangers	0–3
4	April 23	Chicago Black Hawks	2–6	New York Rangers	0–4

Legend: Win Loss

== Player stats ==
=== Regular season ===
Scoring leaders

Player	GP	G	A	Pts	PIM
Bobby Hull	78	50	43	93	24
Pit Martin	78	24	51	75	56
Dennis Hull	78	30	39	69	10
Stan Mikita	74	26	39	65	46
Jim Pappin	64	27	21	48	38

Goaltending

= Indicates league leader

Player	GP	TOI	W	L	T	GA	SO	GAA
Tony Esposito	48	2780	31	10	6	82	9	1.77
Gary Smith	28	1540	14	5	6	62	5	2.42
Gerry Desjardins	6	360	1	2	3	21	0	3.50

=== Playoffs ===
Scoring leaders

Player	GP	G	A	Pts	PIM
Christian Bordeleau	8	3	6	9	0
Bobby Hull	8	4	4	8	6
Jim Pappin	8	2	5	7	4
Pit Martin	8	4	2	6	4
Dennis Hull	8	4	2	6	4

Goaltending

Player	GP	TOI	W	L	GA	SO	GAA
Gary Smith	2	120	1	1	3	1	1.50
Tony Esposito	5	300	2	3	16	0	3.20
Gerry Desjardins	1	60	1	0	5	0	5.00

== Transactions ==
September 9, 1971
October 18, 1971
To California Golden Seals

Kerry Bond
Gerry Desjardins
Gerry Pinder

To California Golden Seals

Gilles Meloche
Paul Shmyr

To Chicago Black Hawks

Gary Smith

To Chicago Black Hawks

Gerry Desjardins

== Draft picks ==
Chicago's draft picks at the 1971 NHL amateur draft held at the Queen Elizabeth Hotel in Montreal.

Round	#	Player	Nationality	College/Junior/Club team (League)
1	12	Dan Spring	Canada	Edmonton Oil Kings (WCHL)
2	26	Dave Kryskow	Canada	Edmonton Oil Kings (WCHL)
3	40	Bob Peppler	Canada	St. Catharines Black Hawks (OHA)
4	54	Clyde Simon	Canada	St. Catharines Black Hawks (OHA)
5	68	Dean Blais	United States	University of Minnesota (NCAA)
6	80	Jim Johnston	Canada	University of Wisconsin (NCAA)

== See also ==
- 1971–72 NHL season

== Sources ==
- Hockey-Reference
- Rauzulu's Street
- Goalies Archive
- HockeyDB
- National Hockey League Guide & Record Book 2007
