= 1971–72 Pittsburgh Penguins season =

NHL team season

1971–72 Pittsburgh Penguins
- Division: 4th West
- 1971–72 record: 26–38–14
- Home record: 18–15–6
- Road record: 8–23–8
- Goals for: 220
- Goals against: 250

Team information
- General manager: Red Kelly (Oct–Jan); Jack Riley (Jan–Apr)
- Coach: Red Kelly
- Captain: Vacant
- Alternate captains: Keith McCreary; Ken Schinkel; Bryan Watson; Bob Woytowich (Oct-Jan)
- Arena: Pittsburgh Civic Arena

Team leaders
- Goals: Greg Polis, Jean Pronovost (30)
- Assists: Syl Apps (44)
- Points: Syl Apps (59)
- Penalty minutes: Bryan Watson (212)
- Wins: Jim Rutherford (17)
- Goals against average: Roy Edwards (2.55)

The 1971–72 Pittsburgh Penguins season was the franchise's fifth season in the National Hockey League (NHL). The team finished 26–38–14 and were tied with their cross-state rival Philadelphia Flyers, who had an identical record, for the fourth and final playoff berth in the West Division. The Penguins made the playoffs for the second time in team history, having won the season series 3–2–1 against the Flyers. However, the Penguins were swept by the Chicago Black Hawks in four games in the first round.

== Regular season ==
=== Final standings ===
West Division
		GP	W	L	T	GF	GA	DIFF	Pts
1	Chicago Black Hawks	78	46	17	15	256	166	+90	107
2	Minnesota North Stars	78	37	29	12	212	191	+21	86
3	St. Louis Blues	78	28	39	11	208	247	−39	67
4	Pittsburgh Penguins	78	26	38	14	220	258	−38	66
5	Philadelphia Flyers	78	26	38	14	200	236	−36	66
6	California Golden Seals	78	21	39	18	216	288	−72	60
7	Los Angeles Kings	78	20	49	9	206	305	−99	49

=== Record vs. opponents ===
==== Vs. West Division ====
1971–72 NHL records
Team	CAL	CHI	LAK	MIN	PHI	PIT	STL	Total
California	—	1–4–1	3–2–1	1–4–1	2–4	2–2–2	0–3–3	9–19–8
Chicago	4–1–1	—	5–1	5–1	3–2–1	5–0–1	6–0	28–5–3
Los Angeles	2–3–1	1–5	—	0–6	2–3–1	1–4–1	2–4	8–25–3
Minnesota	4–1–1	1–5	6–0	—	3–1–2	4–2	4–2	22–11–3
Philadelphia	4–2	2–3–1	3–2–1	1–3–2	—	2–3–1	1–2–3	13–15–8
Pittsburgh	2–2–2	0–5–1	4–1–1	2–4	3–2–1	—	3–3	14–17–5
St. Louis	3–0–3	0–6	4–2	2–4	2–1–3	3–3	—	14–16–6

==== Vs. East Division ====
1971–72 NHL records
Team	BOS	BUF	DET	MTL	NYR	TOR	VAN	Total
California	2–4	3–0–3	2–2–2	0–3–3	1–4–1	2–3–1	2–4	12–20–10
Chicago	1–4–1	3–2–1	5–0–1	1–2–3	1–2–3	4–0–2	3–2–1	18–12–12
Los Angeles	1–4–1	3–2–1	2–3–1	0–5–1	0–6	1–4–1	5–0–1	12–24–6
Minnesota	0–5–1	2–2–2	4–2	1–4–1	3–1–2	2–2–2	3–2–1	15–18–9
Philadelphia	0–6	2–2–2	2–3–1	2–3–1	0–6	2–2–2	5–1	13–23–6
Pittsburgh	1–2–3	1–2–3	2–4	1–4–1	1–3–2	2–4	4–2	12–21–9
St. Louis	1–4–1	4–1–1	3–2–1	1–4–1	1–5	2–4	2–3–1	14–23–5

== Schedule and results ==
1971–72 regular season
October: 5–5–2 (home: 2–2–1; road: 3–3–1)

#	Date	Visitor	Score	Home	Decision	Attendance	Record	Points
1	October 9	Philadelphia	2–3	Pittsburgh		11,733	1–0–0	2
2	October 10	Pittsburgh	1–2	Buffalo		15,429	1–1–0	2
3	October 13	Pittsburgh	4–1	Los Angeles		7,828	2–1–0	4
4	October 16	Pittsburgh	2–1	Vancouver		15,570	3–1–0	6
5	October 17	Pittsburgh	4–2	California		2,123	4–1–0	8
6	October 20	Los Angeles	1–8	Pittsburgh		7,592	5–1–0	10
7	October 23	Chicago	5–2	Pittsburgh		13,100	5–2–0	10
8	October 24	Pittsburgh	1–1	NY Rangers		17,250	5–2–1	11
9	October 27	California	6–4	Pittsburgh		9,238	5–3–1	11
10	October 28	Pittsburgh	0–2	Minnesota		15,101	5–4–1	11
11	October 30	NY Rangers	1–1	Pittsburgh		8,973	5–4–2	12
12	October 31	Pittsburgh	1–3	Detroit		10,870	5–5–2	12

November: 3–9–0 (home: 2–3–0; road: 1–6–0)

#	Date	Visitor	Score	Home	Decision	Attendance	Record	Points
13	November 3	Pittsburgh	3–5	California		3,293	5–6–2	12
14	November 5	Pittsburgh	2–4	Vancouver		15,570	5–7–2	12
15	November 7	Pittsburgh	1–4	Chicago			5–8–2	12
16	November 9	Pittsburgh	4–1	St. Louis		17,888	6–8–2	14
17	November 10	Vancouver	1–3	Pittsburgh		7,324	7–8–2	16
18	November 13	Los Angeles	4–6	Pittsburgh		9,756	8–8–2	18
19	November 16	Minnesota	5–1	Pittsburgh		7,800	8–9–2	18
20	November 18	Pittsburgh	3–4	Minnesota		15,235	8–10–2	18
21	November 20	St. Louis	4–2	Pittsburgh		12,276	8–11–2	18
22	November 21	Pittsburgh	3–7	Chicago			8–12–2	18
23	November 24	Toronto	2–1	Pittsburgh		6,020	8–13–2	18
24	November 27	Pittsburgh	1–3	Montreal		17,500	8–14–2	18

December: 3–7–4 (home: 3–2–3; road: 0–5–1)

#	Date	Visitor	Score	Home	Decision	Attendance	Record	Points
25	December 1	Detroit	2–4	Pittsburgh		7,083	9–14–2	20
26	December 4	NY Rangers	2–4	Pittsburgh		9,662	10–14–2	22
27	December 5	Pittsburgh	3–5	Boston		14,995	10–15–2	22
28	December 8	California	1–1	Pittsburgh		8,831	10–15–3	23
29	December 11	Buffalo	3–3	Pittsburgh		7,603	10–15–4	24
30	December 12	Pittsburgh	1–6	NY Rangers		17,250	10–16–4	24
31	December 15	Pittsburgh	2–3	Toronto		16,324	10–17–4	24
32	December 18	Boston	4–3	Pittsburgh		11,837	10–18–4	24
33	December 19	Pittsburgh	2–2	Boston		14,995	10–18–5	25
34	December 22	Pittsburgh	2–4	NY Rangers		17,250	10–19–5	25
35	December 25	Montreal	2–4	Pittsburgh		7,778	11–19–5	27
36	December 26	Pittsburgh	1–6	Philadelphia		14,626	11–20–5	27
37	December 28	Toronto	4–2	Pittsburgh		11,158	11–21–5	27
38	December 31	Buffalo	3–3	Pittsburgh		7,908	11–21–6	28

January: 1–8–3 (home: 1–4–2; road: 0–4–1)

#	Date	Visitor	Score	Home	Decision	Attendance	Record	Points
39	January 5	Pittsburgh	3–3	Chicago			11–21–7	29
40	January 8	Chicago	4–0	Pittsburgh		13,100	11–22–7	29
41	January 9	Pittsburgh	2–4	Detroit		12,570	11–23–7	29
42	January 12	Boston	2–2	Pittsburgh		8,449	11–23–8	30
43	January 13	Pittsburgh	1–7	Montreal		16,252	11–24–8	30
44	January 15	Philadelphia	2–4	Pittsburgh		9,225	12–24–8	32
45	January 19	Vancouver	6–1	Pittsburgh		7,189	12–25–8	32
46	January 22	Pittsburgh	0–1	St. Louis		18,829	12–26–8	32
47	January 23	Montreal	3–3	Pittsburgh		8,414	12–26–9	33
48	January 26	St. Louis	2–1	Pittsburgh		9,316	12–27–9	33
49	January 29	Chicago	4–2	Pittsburgh		13,006	12–28–9	33
50	January 30	Pittsburgh	0–4	Philadelphia		14,626	12–29–9	33

February: 7–6–0 (home: 4–2–0; road: 3–4–0)

#	Date	Visitor	Score	Home	Decision	Attendance	Record	Points
51	February 3	Pittsburgh	4–3	St. Louis		17,871	13–29–9	35
52	February 5	Pittsburgh	1–8	Los Angeles		10,102	13–30–9	35
53	February 9	Pittsburgh	4–1	Toronto		16,370	14–30–9	37
54	February 10	Los Angeles	1–6	Pittsburgh		6,620	15–30–9	39
55	February 12	NY Rangers	8–3	Pittsburgh		12,031	15–31–9	39
56	February 13	Vancouver	4–6	Pittsburgh		6,806	16–31–9	41
57	February 16	Toronto	2–4	Pittsburgh		7,814	17–31–9	43
58	February 17	Pittsburgh	2–0	Buffalo		15,360	18–31–9	45
59	February 19	Detroit	6–2	Pittsburgh		8,105	18–32–9	45
60	February 20	Pittsburgh	0–2	Minnesota		15,316	18–33–9	45
61	February 23	Pittsburgh	0–2	Toronto		16,362	18–34–9	45
62	February 26	Philadelphia	2–5	Pittsburgh		11,208	19–34–9	47
63	February 27	Pittsburgh	3–5	Montreal		18,003	19–35–9	47

March: 6–3–4 (home: 5–2–0; road: 1–1–4)

#	Date	Visitor	Score	Home	Decision	Attendance	Record	Points
64	March 2	Detroit	4–7	Pittsburgh		7,670	20–35–9	49
65	March 4	Minnesota	2–4	Pittsburgh		10,532	21–35–9	51
66	March 5	Pittsburgh	3–6	Detroit		14,768	21–36–9	51
67	March 8	Montreal	5–4	Pittsburgh		9,598	21–37–9	51
68	March 11	Boston	4–6	Pittsburgh		13,050	22–37–9	53
69	March 12	Pittsburgh	4–4	Boston		14,995	22–37–10	54
70	March 14	Pittsburgh	7–4	Vancouver		15,570	23–37–10	56
71	March 18	Pittsburgh	4–4	Los Angeles		7,174	23–37–11	57
72	March 19	Pittsburgh	3–3	California		5,303	23–37–12	58
73	March 22	Buffalo	4–3	Pittsburgh		11,216	23–38–12	58
74	March 25	Minnesota	2–3	Pittsburgh		12,561	24–38–12	60
75	March 26	Pittsburgh	2–2	Buffalo		15,360	24–38–13	61
76	March 29	California	4–5	Pittsburgh		10,209	25–38–13	63

April: 1–0–1 (home: 1–0–0; road: 0–0–1)

#	Date	Visitor	Score	Home	Decision	Attendance	Record	Points
77	April 1	Pittsburgh	4–4	Philadelphia		14,626	25–38–14	64
78	April 2	St. Louis	2–6	Pittsburgh		13,100	26–38–14	66

Legend: Win (2 points) Loss (0 points) Tie (1 point)

== Playoffs ==
1972 Stanley Cup playoffs
Round one vs Chicago: 0–4 (home: 0–2; road: 0–2)

#	Date	Visitor	Score	Home	Series
1	April 5	Pittsburgh	1–3	Chicago	0–1
2	April 6	Pittsburgh	2–3	Chicago	0–2
3	April 8	Chicago	2–0	Pittsburgh	0–3
4	April 9	Chicago	6–5	Pittsburgh	0–4

Legend: Win Loss

== Player statistics ==
Skaters

Regular season
Player	GP	G	A	Pts	+/−	PIM
Syl Apps Jr.	72	15	44	59	18	78
Jean Pronovost	68	30	23	53	15	12
Greg Polis	76	30	19	49	–4	38
Ron Schock	77	17	29	46	–10	22
Ken Schinkel	74	15	30	45	–10	8
Bryan Hextall Jr.	78	20	24	44	–26	126
Darryl Edestrand	77	10	23	33	–12	52
Bob Leiter	78	14	17	31	–25	18
Nick Harbaruk	78	12	17	29	–13	46
Duane Rupp	34	4	18	22	0	32
Bryan Watson	75	3	17	20	5	212
Val Fonteyne	68	6	13	19	–1	0
René Robert^{‡}	49	7	11	18	–11	42
Al McDonough^{†}	37	7	11	18	–6	8
Steve Cardwell	28	7	8	15	0	18
Eddie Shack^{†}	18	5	9	14	5	12
Dave Burrows	77	2	10	12	–7	48
Tim Horton	44	2	9	11	5	40
John Stewart	25	2	8	10	–6	23
Keith McCreary	33	4	4	8	–10	22
Joe Noris	35	2	5	7	–8	20
Sheldon Kannegiesser	54	2	4	6	–14	47
Bob Woytowich^{‡}	31	1	4	5	–19	8
Brian McKenzie	6	1	1	2	–2	4
Bill Hicke	12	2	0	2	–6	6
Wally Boyer	1	0	1	1	–1	0
Rick Kessell	3	0	1	1	–1	0
Robin Burns	5	0	0	0	–4	8
Total		220	360	580	—	950

Playoffs
Player	GP	G	A	Pts	+/−	PIM
Bob Leiter	4	3	0	3	0	0
Darryl Edestrand	4	0	2	2	0	0
Jean Pronovost	4	1	1	2	0	0
Ken Schinkel	3	2	0	2	0	0
Greg Polis	4	0	2	2	0	0
Bryan Hextall Jr.	4	0	2	2	0	9
Eddie Shack	4	0	1	1	0	15
Nick Harbaruk	4	0	1	1	0	0
Syl Apps Jr.	4	1	0	1	0	2
Al McDonough	4	0	1	1	0	0
Ron Schock	4	1	0	1	0	6
Tim Horton	4	0	1	1	0	2
Steve Cardwell	4	0	0	0	0	2
Dave Burrows	4	0	0	0	0	4
Keith McCreary	1	0	0	0	0	2
Val Fonteyne	4	0	0	0	0	2
Bryan Watson	4	0	0	0	0	21
Duane Rupp	4	0	0	0	0	6
Total		8	11	19	—	71

Goaltenders

Regular Season
Player	GP	W	L	T	GA	SO
Jim Rutherford	40	17	15	5	116	1
Les Binkley	31	7	15	5	98	0
Roy Edwards	15	2	8	4	36	0
Total		26	38	14	250	1

Playoffs
Player	GP	W	L	GA	SO
Jim Rutherford	4	0	4	14	0
Total		0	4	14	0

^{†}Denotes player spent time with another team before joining the Penguins. Stats reflect time with the Penguins only.
^{‡}Denotes player was traded mid-season. Stats reflect time with the Penguins only.

== Awards and records ==
- Val Fonteyne became the first player to play 300 games for the Penguins. He did so in a 1–5 loss to Minnesota on November 16.
- Ken Schinkel became the first player to score 200 points for the Penguins. He did so by recording an assist in a 2–4 loss to Chicago on January 29.
- Bryan Watson became the first player to earn 500 penalty minutes for the Penguins. He did so by receiving 4 PIMs in a 4–2 win over Toronto on February 16.
- Bryan Watson became the first player to earn 200 penalty minutes in one season for the Penguins. He did so by receiving 2 PIMs in a 7–4 win over Vancouver on March 14.
- Jean Pronovost became the first player to score 30 goals in a season for the Penguins. He did so in a 5–4 win over California on March 29.
- Syl Apps Jr. established a new franchise record for highest plus-minus in a season (+18). He broke the previous high of +10 set by Wally Boyer in 1971.
- Val Fonteyne established a career franchise record for games (349). He had led the category since 1969.
- Bob Woytowich set the Penguins career defenseman scoring mark at 93 points. He held the record since 1970.
- Darryl Edestrand became the first defenseman in team history to record 10 goals in a season. He also tied the record for points in a season by a defenseman with 33.

== Transactions ==
The Penguins have been involved in the following transactions during the 1971–72 season:

=== Trades ===
September 4, 1971	To California Golden Seals cash	To Pittsburgh Penguins Bill Hicke
October 3, 1971	To Vancouver Canucks Bob Blackburn	To Pittsburgh Penguins cash
October 6, 1971	To Minnesota North Stars Dean Prentice	To Pittsburgh Penguins cash
November 22, 1971	To Detroit Red Wings Bill Hicke	To Pittsburgh Penguins cash
January 11, 1972	To Los Angeles Kings Bob Woytowich	To Pittsburgh Penguins Al McDonough
March 4, 1972	To Buffalo Sabres Rene Robert	To Pittsburgh Penguins Eddie Shack

=== Player signings ===
Player	Date	Contract terms
Bob Woytowich	September 2, 1971	Re-signed
Tim Horton	September 2, 1971	Re-signed
Wally Boyer	September 2, 1971	Re-signed
Jean Pronovost	September 3, 1971	Signed
Dave Burrows	September 8, 1971	Re-signed
Rene Robert	September 8, 1971	Re-signed
Roy Edwards	September 8, 1971	Re-signed
Cam Newton	May 25, 1972	1-year contract
Jim Rutherford	June 1, 1972	Re-signed
Bryan Hextall Jr.	June 7, 1972	Re-signed

=== Other ===
Player	Date	Details
Andy Bathgate	July 1, 1971	Retired
Roy Edwards	December 30, 1971	Retired
Red Kelly	January 29, 1972	Resigned as GM (remained as head coach)
Jack Riley	January 29, 1972	Hired as GM (in addition to president)
Tim Horton	June 5, 1972	Lost to Buffalo Sabres in intra-league draft
Bobby Leiter	June 6, 1972	Lost to Atlanta Flames in expansion draft
John Stewart	June 6, 1972	Lost to Atlanta Flames in expansion draft
Keith McCreary	June 6, 1972	Lost to Atlanta Flames in expansion draft

== Draft picks ==
Pittsburgh Penguins' picks at the 1971 NHL entry draft.

Round	#	Player	Pos	Nationality	College/Junior/Club team (League)
2	18	Brian McKenzie	Left wing	Canada	St. Catharines Black Hawks (OHA)
3	32	Joe Noris	Center	United States	Toronto Marlboros (OHA)
4	46	Gerry Methe	Defense	Canada	Oshawa Generals (OHA)
5	60	Dave Murphy	Goaltender	Canada	University of North Dakota (NCAA)
6	74	Ian Williams	Right wing	Canada	Notre Dame (NCAA)
7	88	Doug Elliott	Defense	Canada	Harvard University (NCAA)

Draft notes

- The Pittsburgh Penguins' first-round pick went to the St. Louis Blues as the result of a June 6, 1969, trade that sent Ron Schock, Craig Cameron and a 1972 second round pick to the Penguins in exchange for Lou Angotti and this pick.
- The Pittsburgh Penguins' eighth-round pick went to the Vancouver Canucks as the result of a June 10, 1970, trade that had Vancouver promise to not take certain players in expansion draft for this pick.
