= St. Louis Blues–Philadelphia Flyers brawl =

1972 National Hockey League game fight

Blues–Flyers brawl
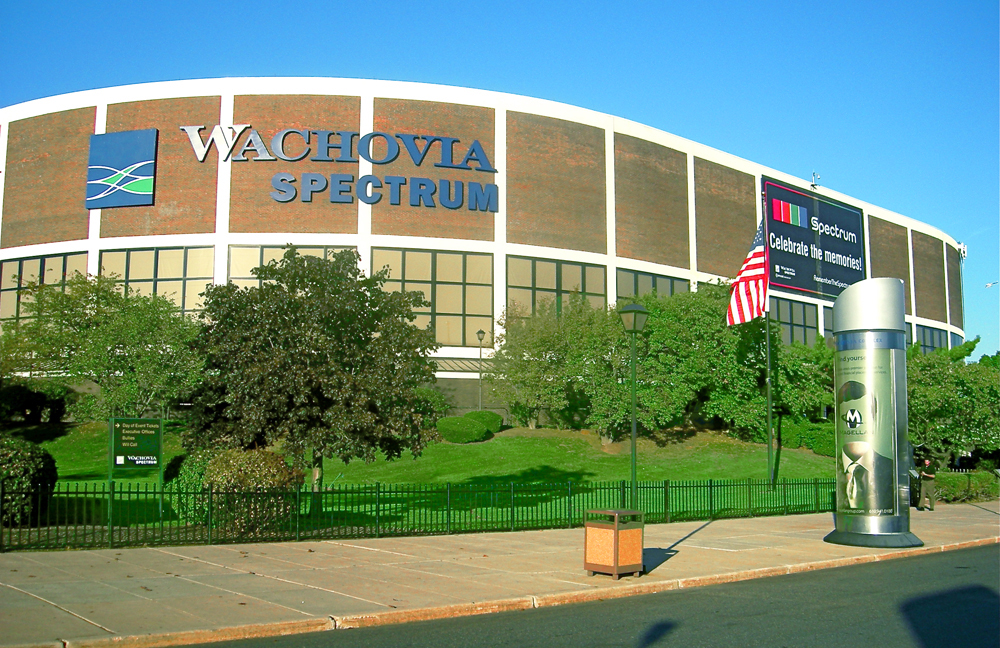
- The Spectrum, where the game took place.
	1	2	3	Total
St. Louis Blues	0	0	3	3
Philadelphia Flyers	0	2	0	2
- Date: January 6, 1972
- Arena: Spectrum
- City: Philadelphia

A fight involving players, fans, and police officers broke out during a National Hockey League (NHL) game between the Philadelphia Flyers and the St. Louis Blues on January 6, 1972, at the Spectrum in Philadelphia. St. Louis-based television station KSDK called the event "one of the worst player-fan-police fights in hockey history".

At the end of the second period, with the Flyers leading 2–0, Blues head coach Al Arbour, followed by Blues defenseman Bob Plager, approached referee John Ashley on a ramp leading off the ice to complain about his officiating. While the three were on the ramp, fans began pouring drinks on and pelting Arbour and Ashley with trash and, after Plager said one fan "took a swing at [Arbour]", Plager rushed into the stands to confront the fan. He was quickly joined by other members of the Blues team as a large-scale brawl broke out between the fans and players. A large group of police arrived and, after about 25 minutes, were able to restore order. Arbour and several other players received injuries that required multiple stitches, while several police officers and fans received minor injuries.

After discussions with officials, the game was allowed to continue, with the Blues scoring three unanswered goals to win the game. Following the game, the police arrested Arbour and three players—John Arbour (no relation), Phil Roberto, and Floyd Thomson—who were charged with disorderly conduct and assault and battery on police officers, though these charges were later dropped. Reporting on the event in the 2020s, KSDK called the event the "wildest night in franchise history" for the Blues, while the SB Nation affiliate for the Blues listed the brawl as the number one fight in the franchise's history.

== Background ==
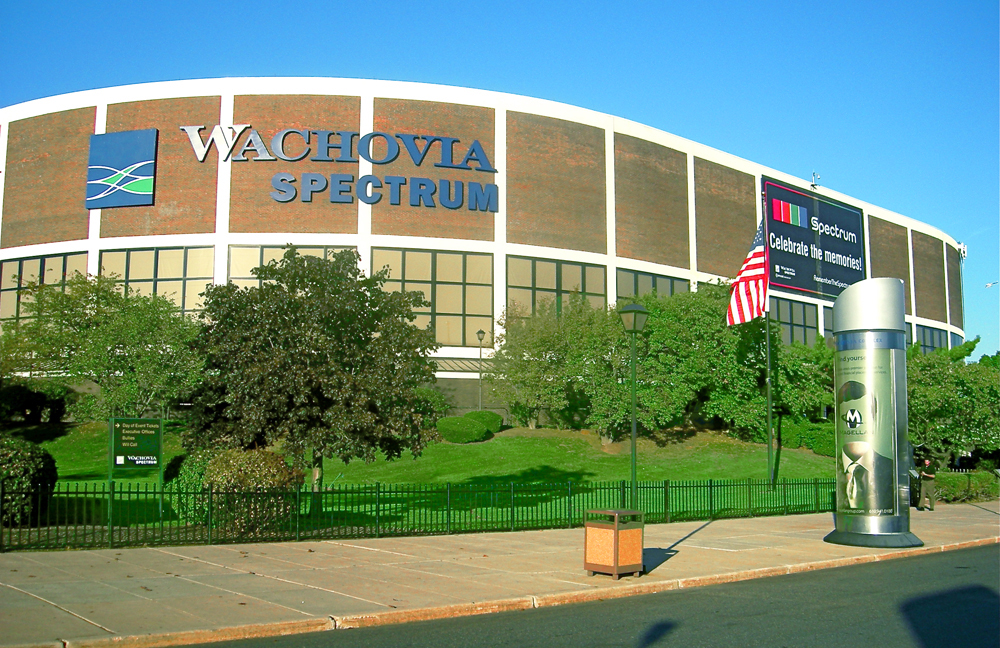
The game took place at the Spectrum (pictured 2008) in Philadelphia on January 6, 1972.

The Philadelphia Flyers and the St. Louis Blues had both joined the National Hockey League (NHL) as expansion teams during the 1967 NHL expansion. Going into the 1971–72 season, both teams were in the league's West Division. According to Jeremy Rutherford, a sportswriter for the Blues, the teams shared a rivalry in their early years, with Fox Sports commentator Scott Warmann describing the teams' matchups during this time as part of a "heated rivalry". On January 6, 1972, the two teams were scheduled to play each other in Philadelphia at the Flyers' home arena, the Spectrum. Prior to the game, the Blues were 10–22–7 for the season, while the Flyers were 11–19–6.

== Game ==
=== Prior to the brawl ===
Following a scoreless first period, the Flyers' Bob Kelly scored early in the second period. Near the end of the period, Jim Johnson of the Flyers scored quickly following a face-off, putting Philadelphia in a 2–0 lead. Following this second goal, St. Louis Blues Head Coach Al Arbour complained to the referee, John Ashley, regarding his officiating. (Note: Sources vary slightly on the specifics of Arbour's complaints. According to contemporary reporting on the event from the Associated Press, Arbour protested the way that Ashley had dropped the hockey puck during the face-off. In a 2022 interview with the St. Louis-based television station KSDK, Garry Unger, who played center for the Blues during that game, stated that during that face-off, the referee had dropped the puck while he was still talking to his winger, before he had placed his ice hockey stick down. In a 2017 interview, Bob Plager, who played for the Blues during that game, said that the referee had made several bad calls prior to the brawl and had dropped the puck early in order to punish the Blues. However, in a contemporary report from United Press International, the cause of the argument was a minor penalty that Ashley had given to a Blues player. Additionally, a 2020 article published by KSDK states that Arbour was protesting two calls from the referee.) At the end of the second period, Arbour followed Ashley across the ice and up the ramp towards the officials' dressing room, where the ice resurfacer comes onto the ice. Players from both teams were heading to their respective locker rooms for the intermission, but Blues defenseman Bob Plager decided to follow Arbour.

=== Brawl ===
While the three were on the ramp, a fan in the bleachers poured a beer onto Arbour, which initiated a scuffle. Fans began throwing their drinks and trash at Arbour and Ashley and, according to Plager, after one fan "took a swing at [Arbour]", Plager dropped his ice hockey stick, took off his gloves, and rushed into the stands to confront the fan. Plager's brothers and teammates, Barclay and Bill, followed after him into the stands to confront the unruly fans. Soon, other Blues players had joined the fray, led by Plager, and began brawling with some of the fans in the stands. In total, about ten Blues players were involved in the incident, including Garry Unger, who swung his hockey stick while in the stands. As part of a giveaway promotion that night at the Spectrum, many fans received free miniature replica hockey sticks, which some used as weapons during the scuffle. Ed Snider, the founder and owner of the Flyers, was in the arena at the time and made his way to the area to intervene, later saying about the incident, "I saw the glazed eyes of their players and got scared for myself". No Flyers players were involved in the fray, in part because the entire team had returned to their locker room by the time the fighting had started.

The police had billy clubs and they whacked Al on the head. And he's bleeding and now he's on the ice and I see all the players all around the Zamboni and there's people in the stands. So I go flying down into this thing. And a guy has a billy club and he's ready to hit one of our players. So I come in behind and I grab him and I've got the billy club underneath his throat and holding him.

— Garry Unger, regarding his part in the brawl

At the time of the incident, there were a few members of the Philadelphia Police Department at the Spectrum. However, after a 16 year old in the stands made a call to the police on a payphone in the arena, a larger group arrived at the scene. Dave Moulder, a patrolman who was among the first to arrive, later said regarding the event, "It was the Blues' sticks against our batons. They were swinging wildly, and caught a couple of people pretty good. Our advantage was that they couldn't keep their balance on the concrete floor on their skates". In total, roughly 200 police officers were involved in the incident. At some point during the fracas, Arbour was struck in the head by a police officer with a baton, which led to more mayhem and direct confrontations between players and police. Plager attempted to intervene by pulling on the officer who had struck Arbour, during which time Plager was also hit with a baton. Blues player Phil Roberto later stated that he also grabbed the officer who struck Arbour and put him into a chokehold because he was afraid he would try to hit Arbour again. In a 2022 interview, Roberto said that many of the players became involved in the scuffle because of the immense support that Arbour had from his team members. The incident lasted about 25 minutes before order was restored, with police officers directing Blues players to their locker room area.

=== After the brawl ===
According to Gary Miller, a sportswriter for the St. Louis Post-Dispatch who was present at the game, the police initially wanted to place the entire Blues team under arrest, and multiple players were placed in handcuffs. While there was some discussion on cancelling the game, the police eventually reached an agreement with the referees to allow the game to finish. However, the brawl caused a delay to the start of the third period, (Note: Sources vary on the length of this delay. Contemporary reporting from the Associated Press stated that the delay was 45 minutes, while a 2023 article in the St. Louis Post-Dispatch states that the delay was 25 minutes long.) in part because the Blues' athletic trainer had to spend time resharpening ice skates that had been dulled by players walking on the concrete in the stands. Because Arbour had had pieces of his clothing removed, damaged, and bloodied, he coached the third period while wearing a t-shirt and a sport jacket. In the third period, the Blues rallied and scored three unanswered goals from players Roberto, Unger, and Gary Sabourin, to beat the Flyers 3–2.

== Aftermath ==
=== Injuries ===
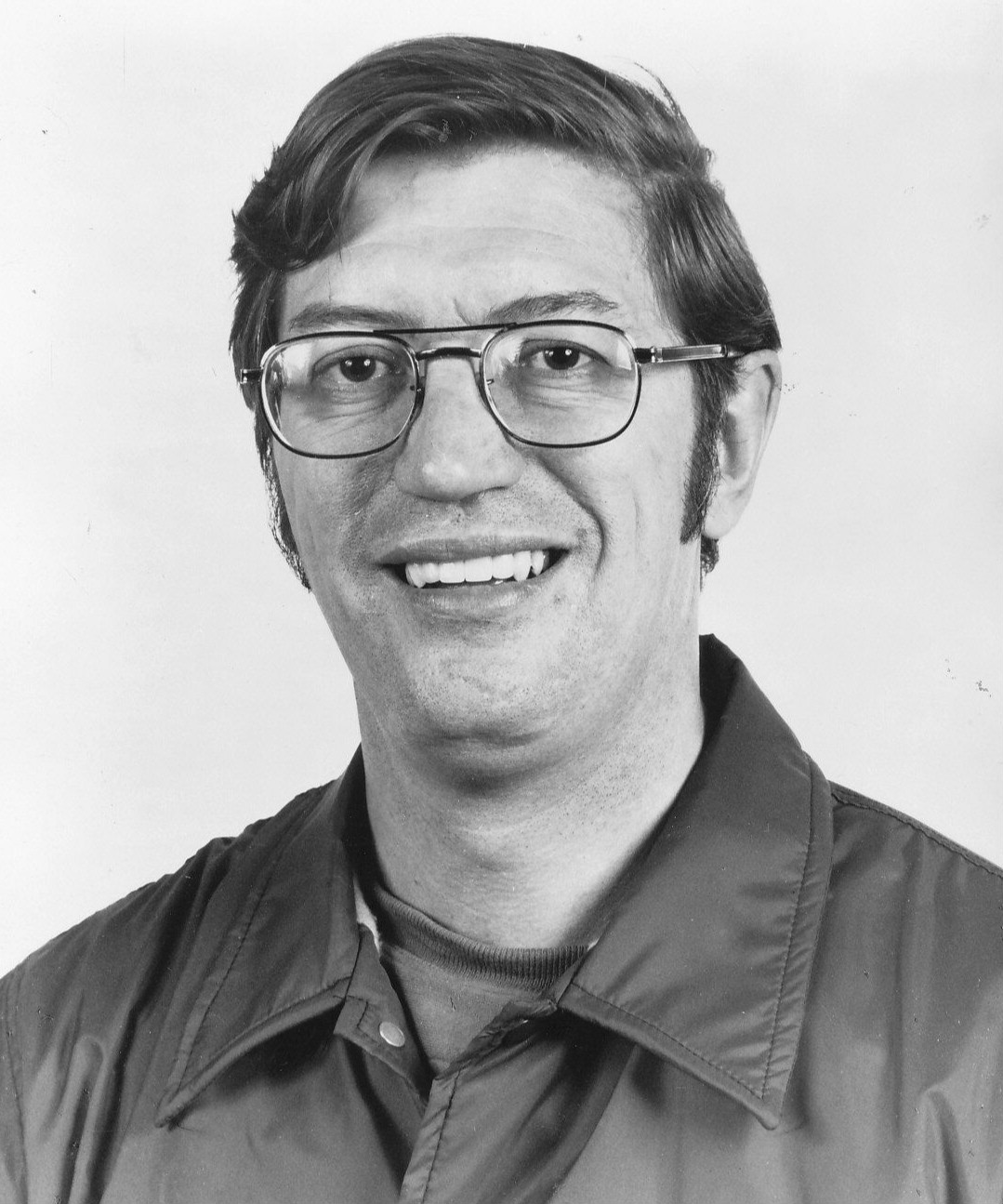
St. Louis Blues Head Coach Al Arbour (pictured 1977) sustained injuries during the brawl that required multiple stitches.

Two police officers and four fans suffered minor injuries from the fracas, with the fans receiving medical care from the arena's medical staff. On the Blues team, multiple players and staff members received cuts that required stitches, including Head Coach Arbour and player John Arbour (no relation), who both required multiple stitches for their injuries. John's injury, a gash on the back of his head that had been caused by a police officer striking him with a hockey stick, required 40 stitches.

=== Arrests and legal actions ===
During the game, Philadelphia Mayor Frank Rizzo ordered a police van to the Spectrum to arrest some of the Blues team members who had been involved in the brawl. At the start of the third period, as the Blues players left the locker room to go to the ice, police recorded the jersey numbers of several of the players for use in making arrests after the game. Bob Plager noticed the police presence and, worried about having his number recorded, told the team's athletic trainer to lock him in the locker room and tell the police the room was empty. Plager left the locker room and rejoined his team on the ice after the police had left the area. Plager's strategy seemingly worked, as despite being involved in the brawl, he was not one of the several players arrested following the game. Instead, after the game was over and the players changed out of their hockey uniforms, police arrested Al Arbour, John Arbour, Phil Roberto, and Floyd Thomson, taking them to the police precinct at 24th Street and Wolf Street in South Philadelphia. Both Miller and Blues owner Sidney Salomon Jr. followed the arrested team members to the precinct. No fans were arrested.

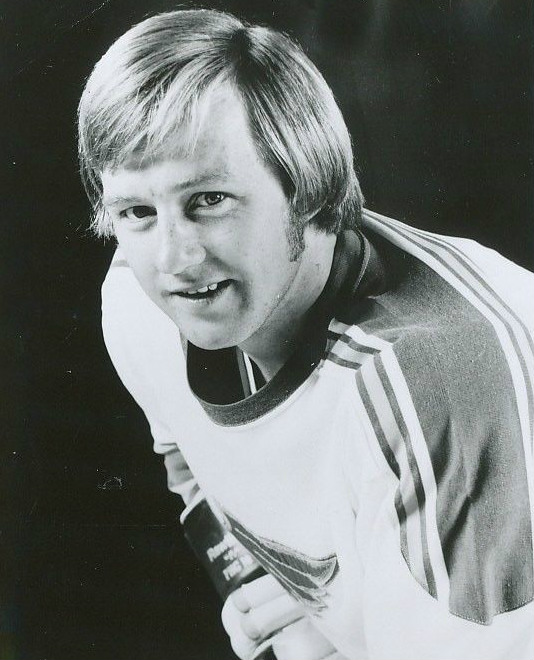
Floyd Thomson (pictured 1973) was among four members of the St. Louis Blues team who were arrested following the game.

Overnight, the players and coach were fingerprinted and interrogated by the police, and in the early morning of January 7, they were transported to the police department's main headquarters in Center City for arraignment. By 6 a.m., Snider had come to the police station and bailed out the Blues team members, paying $500 for each of the arrested. At their hearing, the arrested were charged with disorderly conduct and assault and battery on police officers, while an additional charge of conspiracy to incite a riot was dropped. All of the arrested except for John Arbour were charged with simple assault, with John receiving a harsher charge of aggravated assault. These charges carried maximum fines of $1,000 and jail sentences of up to two years. During their hearings, all of the arrested gave the address for the Blues' home venue, the St. Louis Arena, when the judge asked for their addresses. The four were ultimately released and able to reunite with the rest of the team at their hotel before their return flight to St. Louis.

Salomon was described by Roberto as being "livid" and vowed to fight the charges against his players and staff. He also criticized the Flyers management and the actions of the Philadelphia Police Department, calling the latter "police brutality". The four had their preliminary hearing scheduled in Philadelphia for February 7, the day after another Blues–Flyers game. Immediately following the incident, NHL President Clarence Campbell declined to comment on the matter, saying that he needed more time to assess the facts on the case. In the middle of 1972, the arrested individuals met with Campbell to discuss the matter, but it became a moot issue, as the criminal charges against them were all eventually dropped.

=== Legacy ===
Contemporary coverage of the event from the Associated Press described it as a "near-riot" and a "melee-filled" game, and it was given headline coverage by the Philadelphia Daily News. Later reporting from the St. Louis Post-Dispatch called it "a wild stick-swinging melee", while St. Louis-based television station KSDK has called the event "one of the worst player-fan-police fights in hockey history" and the "wildest night in franchise history" for the Blues. In 2021, St. Louis Game Time, the SB Nation affiliate for the Blues, ranked the fight number one in a list of the top ten fights in the franchise's history.

In 2022, a news report on the event from KSDK called the game a "rallying point" for the Blues, as the team made it to the playoffs that year, advancing as far as the semifinals before losing to the Boston Bruins, the eventual Stanley Cup champions. According to former Blues player and color commentator Bernie Federko, the Blues success against the Flyers, including in this game, may have played a part in the Flyers' shift to a more aggressive style of play in the following seasons, referred to as the "Broad Street Bullies" period, during which time Philadelphia became a more competitive team and won several Stanley Cup championships. Following this game, it would take the Blues 16 years before they were able to beat the Flyers in the Spectrum again.

== Game summary ==
January 6, 1972	St. Louis Blues	3–2	Philadelphia Flyers	Spectrum	Recap

Scoring summary
Period	Team	Goal	Assist(s)	Time	Score
1st	None				
2nd	PHI	Bob Kelly (4)	Unassisted	01:23	1–0 PHI
2nd	PHI	Jim Johnson (12)	Serge Bernier (9)	17:15	2–0 PHI
3rd	STL	Garry Unger (22)	Mike Murphy (7)	07:57	2–1 PHI
3rd	STL	Phil Roberto (7)	Brian Lavender (5) and Floyd Thomson (5)	8:34	2–2
3rd	STL	Gary Sabourin (13)	Andre Dupont (8)	13:14	3–2 STL

Number in parentheses represents the player's total in goals or assists to that point of the season

Penalty summary
Period	Team	Player	Penalty	Time	PIM
1st	STL	Frank St. Marseille	Holding	01:37	2:00
1st	STL	Gary Sabourin	High-sticking	06:34	2:00
1st	PHI	Serge Bernier	Slashing	09:20	2:00
1st	STL	Andre Dupont	Slashing	09:20	2:00
1st	PHI	Serge Bernier	Fighting – major	12:54	5:00
1st	PHI	Jim Johnson	Roughing	12:54	2:00
1st	STL	Brian Lavender	Fighting – major	12:54	5:00
1st	STL	Phil Roberto	Roughing	12:54	2:00
1st	PHI	Barry Ashbee	Hooking	16:39	2:00
2nd	PHI	Bobby Clarke	Elbowing	9:03	2:00
2nd	PHI	Serge Bernier	Elbowing	12:11	2:00
2nd	STL	Bob Plager	Tripping	15:02	2:00
2nd	STL	Gary Sabourin	Elbowing	18:23	2:00
2nd	STL	Frank St. Marseille	Misconduct	18:23	10:00
2nd	STL	Gerry Odrowski	Abuse of officials	20:00	2:00
3rd	None				

Shots by period
Team	1	2	3	Total
St. Louis	10	8	15	33
Philadelphia	8	13	10	31

== See also ==
- List of violent spectator incidents in sports
- Violence in ice hockey

== Sources ==
- Macnow, Glen; Gargano, Anthony L. (2003). "Great Moments 1: Battling the Blues". The Great Philadelphia Fan Book. Foreword by Pat Croce. Moorestown, New Jersey: Middle Atlantic Press. pp. 44–46. ISBN 978-0-9705804-4-3.
- Rutherford, Jeremy (2014). "Mayhem in Philadelphia". 100 Things Blues Fans Should Know & Do Before They Die. Foreword by Brett Hull. Chicago: Triumph Books. pp. 111–114. ISBN 978-1-62368-283-5.
- Sherman, David (2003). "1971–72: High Hopes and Heartbreak". The Philadelphia Flyers Encyclopedia. With Howard Jaffe; Foreword by Keith Jones. Sports Publishing. pp. 29–34. ISBN 978-1-58261-577-6.
