= List of violent incidents between sports participants and spectators =

On a number of occasions throughout history, notable sporting participants have been involved in violent confrontations with spectators during a competition. This list includes events in which a spectator at a sporting event was engaged in such a confrontation with an athlete, coach or game official, either through the spectator's intrusion upon the field of play, or (as a result of such an event) a participant entering the spectator seating area. Incidents of object or snow throwing are included when it results in injuries to a match participant or causes significant delays or cancellation of the event.

It excludes incidents of riots or other violence, often outside the event venue, which did not involve game participants.

== 19th century ==
=== 1879 ===
- 7 February – During the Sydney Riot of 1879, up to 2,000 fans invaded the pitch and disrupted play after an umpiring dispute broke out between members of the visiting English cricket team and the New South Wales Cricket Association; two English players were assaulted, with three fans being arrested.

=== 1893 ===
- 16 June – During a baseball game between the Chicago Colts and New York Giants at New York's Polo Grounds, Umpire Tim Hurst made several controversial calls which made the "Bleacherites ... feverishly indignant." At the end of the game, "a number of ill-bred fellows" from the crowd jumped the railings and rushed at Hurst. With the help of three or four policemen, Hurst escaped with at most a scratch.

=== 1895 ===
- 26 January – Following the Football League game between Woolwich Arsenal and Burton Wanderers, referee John Brodie was assaulted by a spectator and knocked unconscious. Consequently, the Manor Ground was closed for six weeks.

=== 1897 ===
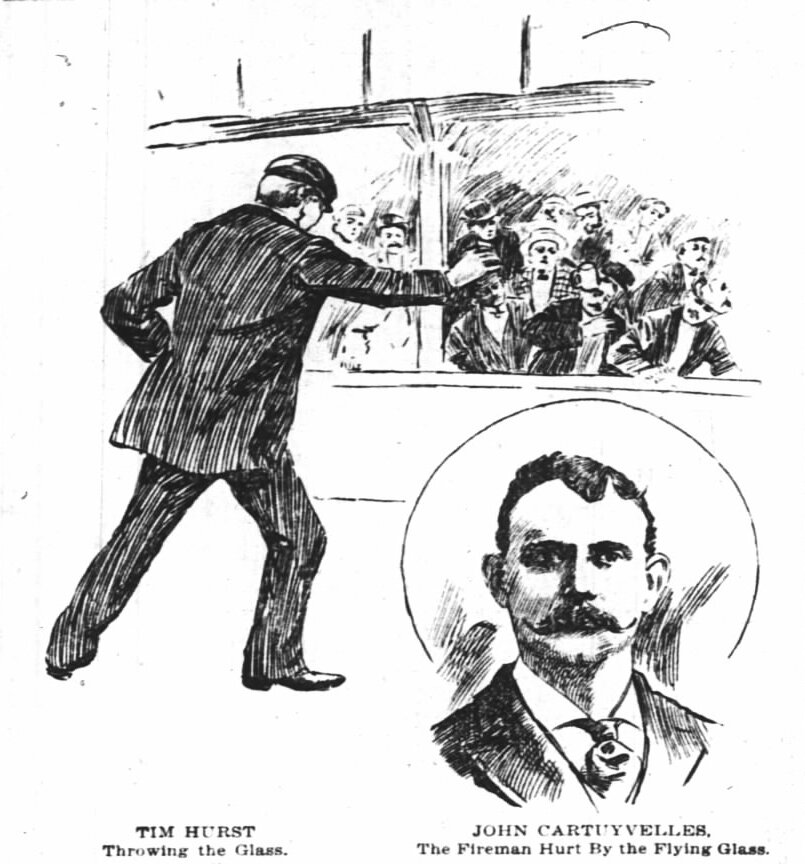
An artist's rendition of the incident in The Cincinnati Enquirer

- 4 August – During a baseball game between Cincinnati and Pittsburgh at Cincinnati's League Park, Umpire Tim Hurst angered fans by ruling that Cincinnati's Bug Holliday was tagged out despite having been deliberately tripped by Pittsburgh's Dick Padden. After a fan threw a beer glass onto the field which landed at Hurst's feet, Hurst threw the glass back into the crowd, hitting an innocent fan in the head who "fell to the floor like an ox hit on the head with a sledgehammer." The man was carried off unconscious and in serious condition while police had to keep the crowd from attacking Hurst. Hurst was ultimately arrested and charged with assault.

== 20th century ==
=== 1901 ===
- 21 August – In the bottom of the 4th inning of an American League Baseball game between the Baltimore Orioles and the Detroit Tigers at Baltimore, the Tigers were leading 7–4 when the lead-off batter for Baltimore was called out at first base; Orioles players surrounded and argued with umpire Tom Connolly about the call, and a bench-clearing brawl broke out. Fans responded by invading the field and storming the box office for refunds, with Orioles pitcher Joe McGinnity being ejected for spitting in Connolly's eyes, Detroit's Kid Elberfeld exchanging punches with Baltimore's Mike Donlin before Donlin's teammate Bill Keister got involved, and Connolly was assaulted by fans as he escaped to the groundskeeper's office, staying there for over an hour before the crowd thinned out enough for him to leave, with McGinnity, Elberfeld, Keister and a fan being arrested and escorted off the field by police. McGinnity was suspended for 10 games, the fan was fined $100 for disorderly conduct, and the game was ruled a forfeit to the Tigers.

=== 1902 ===
- 7 June – At the end of a Victorian Football League match between Carlton and Fitzroy at Princess Park, a group of drunk Carlton fans jostled and kicked field umpire Henry "Ivo" Crapp.

=== 1904 ===
- 9 July – As the riders in the 1904 Tour de France climbed the Col de la République in the Loire department, supporters of regional favorite Antoine Fauré physically attacked several of his opponents. The repercussions of this incident continue to this day: the Tour did not return to Loire until 1950, and although the Tour has returned to the République (the first pass of 1,000 metres ever climbed in the Tour) 11 times since then, its appearances in the 1903 and 1904 Tours are no longer officially recognized as Tour climbs.
- 9 July – After a drawn VFL match between Geelong and Carlton at Corio Oval, a Carlton fan ran onto the field and punched field umpire Henry "Ivo" Crapp in the face; Geelong secretary Charles Brownlow, a former player for the club, jumped the fence, tackled the fan and restrained him until police arrived.
- 31 August – During a baseball game between the Cincinnati Reds and New York Giants at Cincinnati's League Park, Giants catcher Frank Bowerman left the bench to attack a taunting fan, allegedly on orders from manager John McGraw. Bowerman was arrested but the victim declined to press charges.

=== 1906 ===
- 27 July – Charlie Carr, player-manager for the Indianapolis Indians, entered the crowd and struck a spectator three or four times in the head, knocking him down and causing him to sprain his wrist. Carr was tried for assault but acquitted due to a jurisdictional technicality.

=== 1908 ===
- 6 June – At the end of a fiery VFL match between Fitzroy and Essendon at the Brunswick Street Oval, a group of Fitzroy fans invaded the ground and assaulted Essendon players as they tried to leave the field, forcing Essendon fans to jump the fence in order to protect their players; a wild all-in brawl between players, rival fans and team officials ensued, and Essendon's captain Alan Belcher was escorted from the ground under the protection of Victoria Police Constable and former Collingwood player Bill Proudfoot. Three players were suspended for four matches each by the VFL.

=== 1909 ===
- 17 April – At the end of the drawn 1909 Scottish Cup Final replay between Rangers and Celtic at Hampden Park, when it became clear there would be no extra time played as hoped, 6,000 spectators invaded the pitch, resulting in multiple brawls between rival fans. Over 2½ hours, fans tore up the goalposts, lit numerous fires on wooden barricades and throughout the arena and fought with and assaulted mounted police, firefighters and ambulance staff when they arrived, including pelting them with various objects. The riots and fires caused £1,000 in damage, with 58 police officers and 60 other people being injured. The 1909 Scottish Cup and all medals were withheld.
- 4 September – During a VFL match between Collingwood and Melbourne at Victoria Park, a Collingwood fan jumped the fence and punched a Melbourne player in the face. Melbourne Club Secretary J. A. Harper ran onto the field and made a citizens' arrest.

=== 1910 ===
- 28 May – During the last quarter of a VFL match at Princes Park between Carlton and South Melbourne, Carlton's George Topping knocked-out South Melbourne's Bert Streckfuss behind the play, causing fans to jump the fence and participate in a wild all-in brawl with players and team officials. Topping had to be escorted from the ground under police protection; he was later suspended for the remainder of the season and all of 1911 (35 matches) for starting the brawl.
- 24 June – During a baseball game at Washington Park in Brooklyn, Art Devlin of the New York Giants punched a spectator in the jaw, knocking him unconscious for seven minutes. Devlin was charged with assault, suspended and sued by the spectator.

=== 1912 ===
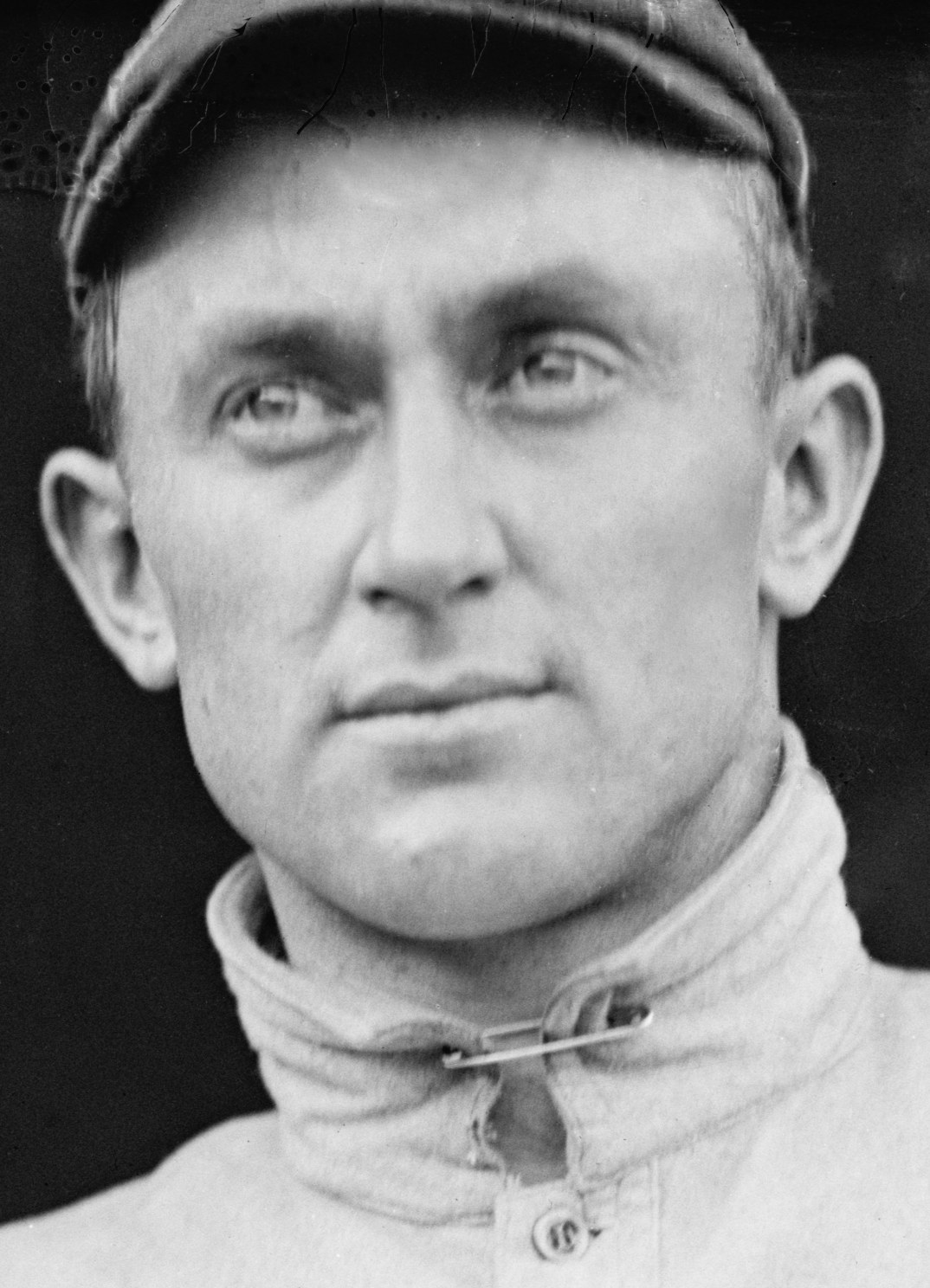
Ty Cobb

- 15 May – During the sixth inning of a game between the New York Highlanders and the Detroit Tigers at Hilltop Park in New York, Tigers outfielder Ty Cobb ran into the stands and assaulted a handicapped fan, Claude Lueker, after Lueker had heckled him throughout the first three innings (reportedly saying "I don't care if he's got no feet!" when called out on this). Cobb was ejected, suspended indefinitely and fined $50 for the incident. Cobb's teammates, though not fond of him, went on strike to protest the suspension prior to the 18 May game against the Philadelphia A's; Detroit, after being threatened with a $5‚000 fine for failing to field a team, fielded a team of college and sandlot ballplayers and two of their coaches and lost 24–2. After American League president Ban Johnson threatened the striking players with indefinite suspensions, the strike ended ten days later when Cobb paid his fine and urged his teammates to return to the field in exchange for his suspension being lifted.
- 11 September – Umpire Tom Connolly was struck in the mouth by a bottle thrown from the crowd while he was arguing with Ty Cobb, who had been called out for stepping across home plate after he had hit a triple with a run batted in on the third pitch of what was to have been an intentional walk.

=== 1913 ===
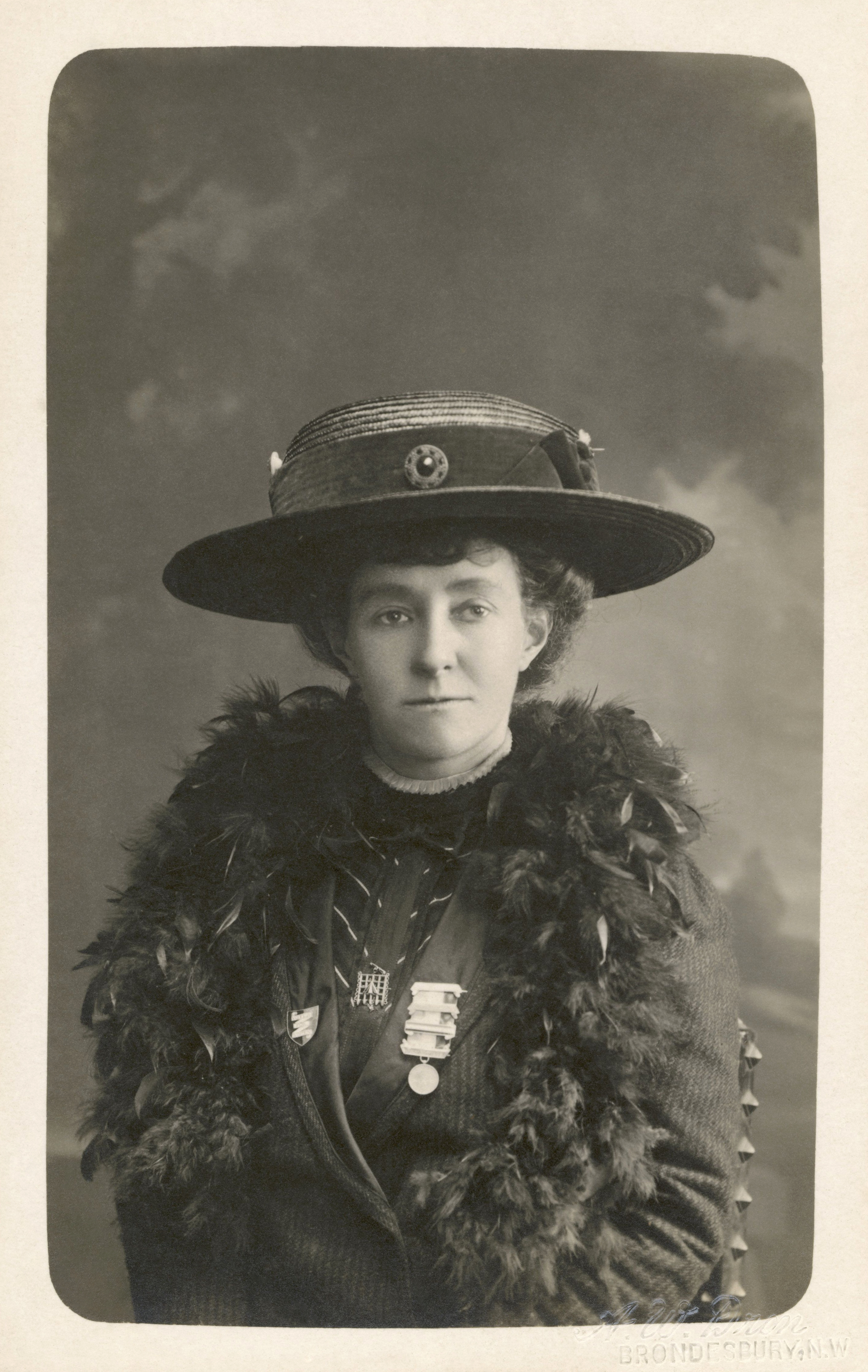
Emily Davison

- 4 June – Emily Davison, a women's suffrage activist, ran onto the track during The Derby race and was trampled to death by a horse.

=== 1914 ===
- 2 May – At the end of a VFL match between Carlton and St Kilda at Princes Park, a crowd of 2,000 angry Carlton fans mobbed the field umpire, who had to be escorted from the ground under police protection.
- 25 July – During a VFL match between South Melbourne and Essendon at the Lake Oval, a South Melbourne fan invaded the field and punched Essendon captain Alan Belcher in the back of the head; Belcher then chased the fan and knocked him unconscious. Belcher was reported for assaulting the fan, but was cleared.

=== 1915 ===
- 7 August – During the last quarter of a tight VFL match at the MCG between Melbourne and South Melbourne, Melbourne's Len Incigneri king-hit South Melbourne's George Payne behind the play, causing 2,000 fans to invade the field and participate in a wild 15 minute all-in brawl with players, team officials and police. Incigneri had to be escorted from the ground under police protection; he was later suspended for eight matches for starting the brawl.

=== 1920 ===
- 11 September – In the VFA Second Semi-Final between Footscray and North Melbourne at the Western Oval, hundreds of Footscray fans invaded the field as North Melbourne defender Bill Considine went back to take a kick after the bell with Footscray leading by four points. Umpires and police attempted to clear a path for Considine to take his kick, but Considine was eventually escorted from the ground under police protection. The VFA declared the Second Semi-Final a "no result" and ordered a replay at Brunswick.

=== 1922 ===
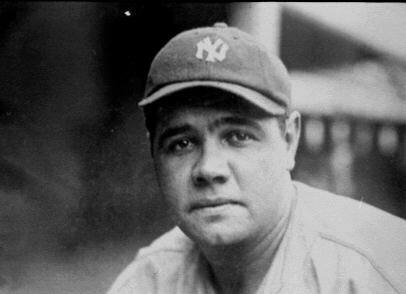
Babe Ruth

- May – After being ejected from a game at The Polo Grounds for throwing dirt in the eyes of the umpire, Babe Ruth chased a heckler through the stands. When the fan ran out of reach, Ruth returned to the dugout roof and challenged any fan in attendance to fight him. Ruth was suspended for seven games and fined $200 for the incident.

=== 1923 ===
- 20 September – After a Pacific Coast League game between the San Francisco Seals and Sacramento Senators in Sacramento, an angry mob of fans chased umpires Lord Byron and Jim Ward out of the ballpark. The violent crowd shouted, spat, struck and threw things at the umpires, including stones and bricks. The umpires had to be escorted by Seals players, including Joe Kelly and Ray Flaskamper, both of whom reportedly punched rioters, and Archie Yelle, who was hit in the face with a stone intended for Byron and required stitches below his eye. Ward was knocked unconscious by a brick to the head.

=== 1924 ===
- 18 May – During the Olympic rugby union final between France and the United States at Colombes Stadium, French fans booed and hissed the American team for the remainder of the game after star player Adolphe Jauréguy was flattened by a hard tackle two minutes after the opening whistle, leaving him unconscious with blood pouring down his face and having to be carried off the field on a stretcher. In the second half, French fans threw bottles and rocks onto the field and at American players and officials, wild brawls broke out in the stands, U.S. reserve Gideon Nelson was knocked unconscious after being hit in the face by a walking stick, and French fans invaded the pitch at the final whistle, leaving the French team, aided by the police, to protect the Americans. At the medal ceremony, "The Star-Spangled Banner" was drowned out by the booing and hissing of French fans, and the American team had to be escorted to their locker room under police protection.
- 13 June – In an American League baseball game between the New York Yankees and the Detroit Tigers at Navin Field, Yankees batter Bob Meusel was hit in the ribs with the first pitch he faced, to which Muesel responded by walking to the mound and throwing a punch at pitcher Bert Cole; Muesel was restrained by umpires Billy Evans and Red Ormsby and ejected. Babe Ruth then charged from the dugout, swinging his fists, claiming that Cole was throwing at the Yankees, and a bench-clearing brawl broke out. After a few minutes, Ruth was ejected, but Meusel and Ruth took a detour on the way back to the clubhouse and headed to the Tiger dugout, which resulted in another bench-clearing brawl; fans invaded the field, forcing police to escort the players to safety, and numerous brawls broke out between rival fans and police on the field. It took half an hour to clear the field, but the umpires had ruled the game a forfeit to the Yankees.

=== 1925 ===
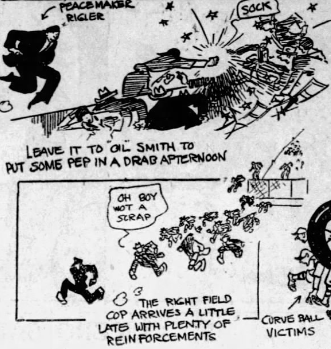
An excerpt from a cartoon in The Boston Globe depicting Earl Smith's attack of a fan

- 14 May – Pittsburgh Pirates catcher Earl Smith charged into the crowd at Boston's Braves Field during a baseball game against the Boston Braves and punched a spectator. He was restrained by umpires as policemen and young fans spilled onto the field. As he was being escorted out of the ballpark, he exchanged words with another fan who threw a chair at him, hitting and cutting his head. A charge of assault was levied against Smith but ultimately dismissed at the request of the victim.

=== 1927 ===
- 7 June – Walking off the field after being removed from the third inning of a game, St. Louis Browns pitcher Milt Gaston ran into the grandstand at Shibe Park and attacked a heckler. Teammates and police pulled him from the crowd and the game resumed.

=== 1934 ===
- 20 July – During the third inning of a minor league baseball game in Scranton, Pennsylvania, Scranton Miners pitcher Dutch Schesler charged into the crowd and exchanged blows with a spectator. Other fans and players joined the fight until Schesler was pulled out of the crowd and arrested. Later in the same game, a fire broke out in the bleachers.
- 9 October – In the 6th inning of Game 7 of the 1934 World Series between the St. Louis Cardinals and the Detroit Tigers at Navin Field, the Cardinals were leading 9–0, with the game and series all but won, when Cardinal outfielder Joe Medwick got into a heated altercation with Tigers third baseman Marv Owen after sliding into and injuring him. In the 7th inning, Medwick was booed and pelted with bottles, fruit, vegetables, and garbage by angry Detroit fans when he went to his position in left field; after a long delay, Medwick was ejected, and he was escorted from the stadium by police. The game was resumed with the Cardinals winning the game (and the World Series) 11–0.

=== 1936 ===
- 8 August – With five minutes remaining in extra time in an Olympic football match between Peru and Austria, a group of Peruvian fans, one brandishing a revolver, invaded the pitch and assaulted Austrian players, officials and stadium security; during the ensuing chaos, Peru scored two goals and won the match 4–2. The IOC and FIFA declared the match null and void, and ordered that a replay take place two days later behind closed doors, but Peru refused to play and withdrew from the Games. Austria, declared winners on default, went on to win the silver medal.

=== 1940 ===
- 16 September – A Brooklyn Dodgers fan jumped on the field to attack umpire George Magerkurth so that the fan's pickpocket partner could work the stands.

=== 1942 ===
- 12 September – Detroit Tigers pitcher Dizzy Trout was ejected and suspended for five games after entering the stands at Briggs Stadium and grabbing a fan, although no punches were thrown.

=== 1943 ===
- 8 May – During a spiteful VFL match between Essendon and South Melbourne at Windy Hill, South Melbourne's Jack 'Basher' Williams felled Ted Leehane in retribution for Leehane's similar action against Williams in the previous year's Preliminary Final, starting a wild brawl which involved a dozen players, team officials, trainers, fans, and police. Williams received an eight-match suspension on four striking charges.

=== 1949 ===
- 21 August – During a National League game between the Philadelphia Phillies and New York Giants, New York was ahead 3–2 with one out in the top of the ninth inning of the second game of a doubleheader when umpire George Barr ruled that Richie Ashburn had missed a diving catch of a ball off the bat of Joe Lafata, scoring Willard Marshall with the fourth run. The Philadelphia players complained, but when the call was not reversed, Philadelphia fans threw glass bottles onto the field, and the barrage continued despite pleas over the public address system; umpire Lee Ballanfant was hit in the mouth by a bottle and umpire Al Barlick was hit in the back of the head by a tomato. After waiting for fifteen minutes, Barlick ruled the game a forfeit to the Giants.

=== 1955 ===
- 22 January – During a game between the Toronto Maple Leafs and the Detroit Red Wings at Maple Leaf Gardens, Red Wings forward Ted Lindsay leaned over the glass and struck a drunk Maple Leafs fan with his stick after the fan had scuffled with and spilled beer over teammate Gordie Howe. Lindsay was given a match penalty and suspended for five games for the incident.

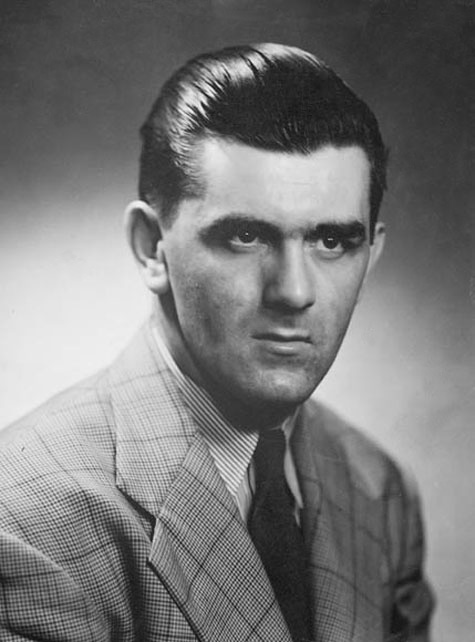
Maurice Richard

- 17 March – Midway into the first period of a game at the Montreal Forum between the Montreal Canadiens and the Detroit Red Wings, Canadiens fans outraged at the remainder of the season suspension handed to superstar Maurice "Rocket" Richard for knocking out linesman Cliff Thompson during a fight in a 13 March game booed Red Wings players, officials, and NHL President Clarence Campbell and his fiancée and pelted them with various objects as the Red Wings built up a 4–1 lead. After police set off a tear gas bomb inside the Forum and ordered a total evacuation, a furious and bloodied Campbell ruled the game a forfeit to the Red Wings.

=== 1961 ===
- 10 September – In the first half of a doubleheader at Yankee Stadium, Cleveland Indians outfielder Jimmy Piersall was attacked by two Yankee fans who ran onto the field. Piersall quickly dispatched the first fan with a single punch and then chased after the other, who was intercepted and pummeled by Indian teammates Johnny Temple and Walt Bond.

=== 1967 ===
- 30 September – In the Tasmanian State Premiership Grand Final between Wynyard and North Hobart at West Park in Burnie, hundreds of Wynyard fans invaded the field and tore down the goalposts as North Hobart full-forward David Collins went back to take a kick after the siren with Wynyard leading by one point. Umpires, players, team officials and police attempted to clear a path for Collins to take his kick, but Collins was eventually escorted from the ground under police protection. Teammate Barry Styles was left unconscious with broken fingers after being trampled by the crowd and had to be carried from the field on a stretcher. The Tasmanian Football League declared the Grand Final a "no result" and withheld the 1967 State Premiership.

=== 1968 ===
- 18 May – In the final quarter of a VFL match between Essendon and Collingwood at Windy Hill, a drunk Essendon fan jumped the fence and punched field umpire Ray Sleeth in the face.
- 26 October – In the Olympic football final, Bulgarian fans threw various objects onto the field in the 44th minute with Hungary leading 2–1 to protest the officiating after three Bulgarian players, Tzevan Dimtriov, captain Kiril Ivkov and Atanas Christov were sent off causing a 15-minute delay. Dimtriov was dismissed for a dangerous tackle on Hungarian striker Antal Dunai while he was taking a shot at goal, as was Ivkov immediately after for arguing with the referee. As Dimitriov and Ivkov, who had been booked before the match for a brawl in the tunnel with Hungarian players, were making their way off the pitch, Christov picked up the ball and drop-kicked it towards the referee in protest, and was promptly sent off. With Bulgaria down to eight men for the second half, Hungary won the match and the gold medal 4–1.

=== 1970 ===
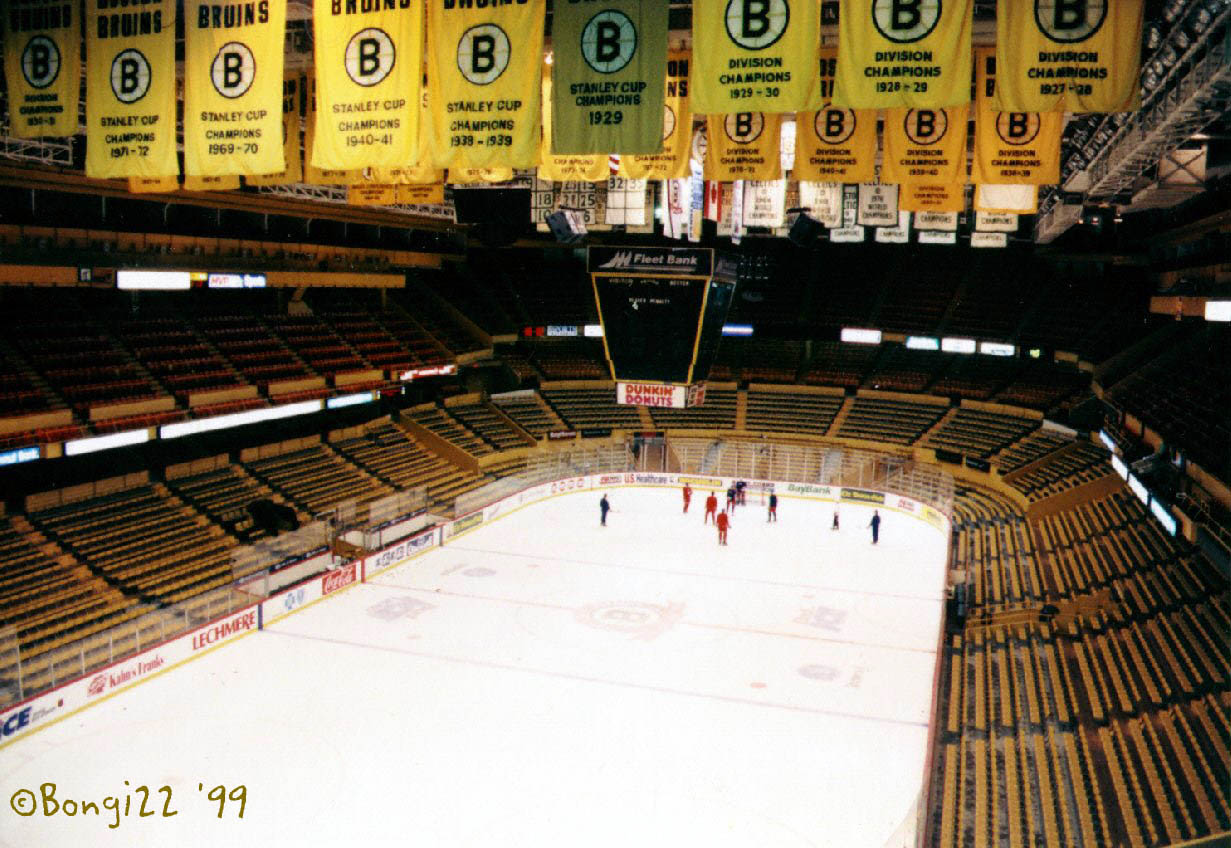
Boston Garden

- 8 November – During a bench-clearing brawl with the Montreal Canadiens and the Boston Bruins at the Boston Garden, fans behind the Montreal bench got involved in altercations with the players, coaching staff and trainers. Boston police were forced to step in to restore order.

=== 1971 ===
- 13 February – During the second day of the seventh and final Ashes Test between Australia and England at the Sydney Cricket Ground, beer bottles and cans were thrown onto the outfield and English fast bowler John Snow was loudly booed and manhandled by a drunk and drug-affected fan on the boundary when Australian Terry Jenner was forced to retire hurt after having accidentally ducked into a bouncer from Snow. English captain Ray Illingworth pulled his team from the field in disgust, but England returned seven minutes later after umpires Tom Brooks and Lou Rowan warned Illingworth that the match and the Ashes would be awarded to Australia. During a further seven-minute delay to clear the field, a sight-screen attendant was hit by a beer can thrown from the crowd, leaving him unconscious and having to be carried from the field on a stretcher. Arrests of 14 fans for offensive behaviour were made and an additional 190 fans were ejected.
- 30 September – During the top of the ninth inning of a Major League Baseball game between the Washington Senators and the New York Yankees at RFK Memorial Stadium, the Senators' last game in Washington before their move to Texas, the Senators were leading 7–5 with two outs when hundreds of disgruntled Senators fans invaded the field and vandalized the stadium, taking the bases as souvenirs, and assaulting police, umpires and stadium security. Three men were arrested for disorderly conduct, and the game was forfeited to the Yankees.
- 11 December – A drunk fan who ran onto the field and attempted to steal the game ball was leveled by Mike Curtis in the fourth quarter of a Baltimore Colts' 14–3 win over the Miami Dolphins at Memorial Stadium.

=== 1972 ===
- 6 January – St. Louis Blues–Philadelphia Flyers brawl: St. Louis Blues coach Al Arbour and several players entered the stands to fight fans at the Spectrum in Philadelphia after Arbour was showered with debris.
- 29 December – Players from the Philadelphia Flyers entered the stands at the Pacific Coliseum in Vancouver after a fan reached over the glass and pulled the hair of Don Saleski.

=== 1974 ===
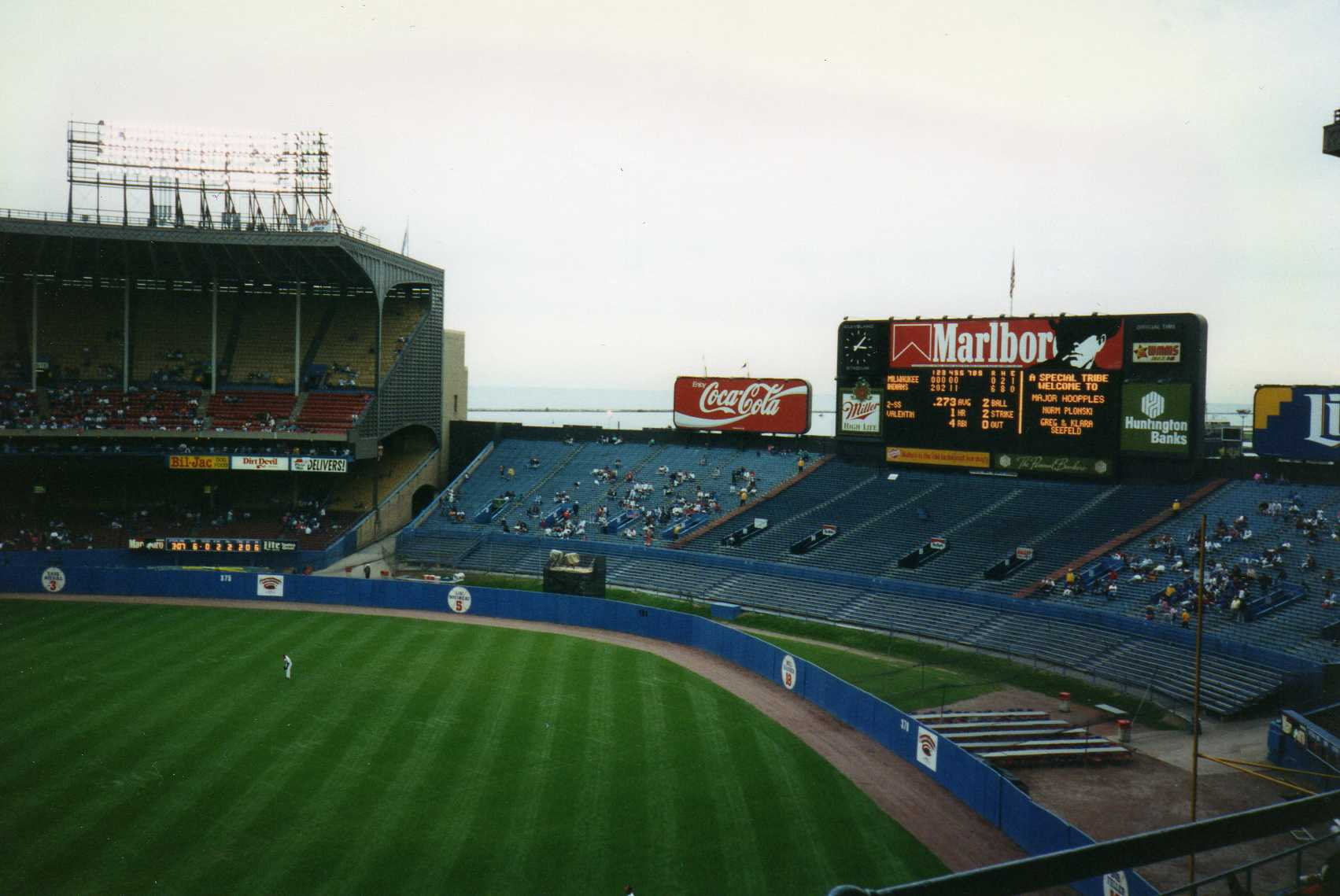
Cleveland Municipal Stadium, circa 1993

- 4 June – "Ten Cent Beer Night" – For a game between the Cleveland Indians and the Texas Rangers at the Cleveland Municipal Stadium, fans were served as many 10-ounce cups of beer as they wanted for 10¢ each. After numerous instances of drunk fans being involved in object throwing, running onto the field or streaking, the situation boiled over in the 9th inning when a drunk fan ran onto the field and snatched Rangers outfielder Jeff Burroughs' cap and glove. Burroughs' teammates charged out to his aid, followed by hundreds of Cleveland fans who poured onto the field; in the ensuing chaos, Indians manager Ken Aspromonte ordered his players to grab bats and protect the Rangers from their own fans, Rangers manager Billy Martin grabbed a bat and ran into the crowd, Cleveland pitcher Tom Hilgendorf was hit in the back of the head with a metal chair, and chief umpire Nestor Chylak was hit in the head with a chair thrown from the stands and required stitches. Nine people were arrested, and the game was forfeited to Texas.

=== 1975 ===
- 6 December – In Rehovot, Israel, the Maccabi Rehovot F.C. led the Kfar Gvirol team 1–0 at a regular C league soccer game, when the referee called for a foul committed on Maccabi's goalkeeper. In response, many of the fans burst onto the field, and one of the fans, Shimon Kroha, stabbed Macabbi's player Mordechai (Moti) Kind in the heart. Kind died on the grass, and Kfar Gvirol was suspended from any activity indefinitely.
- 28 December – In Bloomington, Minnesota, the Minnesota Vikings led the Dallas Cowboys 14–10 when Dallas quarterback Roger Staubach threw what would become known as the "Hail Mary pass" to wide receiver Drew Pearson for what would be the winning touchdown and a final score of 17–14, but not without controversy. The Vikings protested because they believed that Pearson pushed off, which, by rule, is offensive pass interference, which would have negated the touchdown and cost the Cowboys 10 yards, but field judge Armen Terzian ruled the catch and touchdown legal, and assessed Vikings defensive tackle Alan Page a 15-yard unsportsmanlike conduct penalty for arguing with officials. Page was also ejected. After the kickoff, with 14 seconds left to play, Fran Tarkenton argued with officials about the controversial no-call and encouraged fans to throw objects onto the field. Then a whiskey bottle thrown by a fan hit Terzian in the head, creating a forehead gash. See Hail Mary pass#Origins for details.

=== 1976 ===
- 31 March – In the closing minutes of the 1975–76 European Cup semi-final first leg between Real Madrid and Bayern Munich, a local supporter annoyed with the officiating ran onto the field of play and punched referee Erich Linemayr and Bayern goalscorer Gerd Müller before being restrained – however in the excitement he was allowed to slip back into the crowd. Bayern went on to win the tie and subsequently the trophy, Real Madrid were ordered to play their matches in the following year's competition away from their home city, and the event became a catalyst for one of European football's most enduring cross-border rivalries.
- 25 April – Two fans, William Thomas and his 11-year-old son, ran into the outfield at Dodger Stadium and attempted to set fire to an American flag with matches and lighter fluid before Chicago Cubs outfielder Rick Monday ran over, grabbed the flag and carried it away to a standing ovation; Dodger third base coach Tommy Lasorda ran out to center field and launched a profanity-filled tirade at the protestors before being restrained by security. Monday handed the flag to Los Angeles pitcher Doug Rau, after which Thomas and his son were arrested.
- 4 June – After a John Havlicek drive and leaning one-hander in traffic put Boston in front 111–110 as time expired in the second overtime of game 5 of the NBA finals between the Boston Celtics and the Phoenix Suns at Boston Garden, fans invaded the court to celebrate Boston's victory and the Celtics returned to their locker room before CBS analyst Rick Barry loudly pointed out that the ball had gone through the hoop with two seconds left on the clock. Officials agreed with Barry and ordered the Celtics back onto the floor, but during the ensuing pandemonium, a drunk fan attacked referee Richie Powers and other fans turned over one of the scorer's tables. After a ten-minute delay to clear the court and get the Celtics back on the floor, the officials put one second back on the clock. Garfield Heard hit a turnaround jumper to tie the game to send it into triple overtime, after the Suns called an illegal timeout to move the ball to half court. Boston eventually won 128–126 in triple overtime. The fan who attacked Powers was arrested, and the fans who overturned the scorer's table were ejected.
- 23 July – With 1:22 remaining in the third quarter of the Chicago College All-Star Game at Soldier Field, Chicago, the Pittsburgh Steelers led the College All-Stars 24–0 when a torrential rainstorm hit the field that made play impossible. After officials called for a delay, drunk and unruly fans invaded the field and tore down the goalposts. Officials, stadium security and police attempted to clear the field, but twelve minutes later, NFL Commissioner Pete Rozelle and representatives of the sponsoring Chicago Tribune announced that the game had been called, to loud booing from fans, and numerous brawls broke out on the flooded field before order was restored.

=== 1978 ===
- During a Central Hockey League game between the Fort Worth Texans and Dallas Black Hawks at the Will Rogers Coliseum, during a "ten cent beer night" promotion, a bench-clearing brawl resulted in further altercations involving brawls between rival fans in the stands. Five fans were injured and ten were arrested. This and the earlier ten cent beer night incident in Cleveland led to the banning of significant discount alcohol promotions and tighter regulation of other alcohol promotional sales.

=== 1979 ===
- 12 July – Disco Demolition Night – In a promotion conceived by Chicago DJ Steve Dahl, fans got admission to a Comiskey Park doubleheader for 98¢ between the Chicago White Sox and Detroit Tigers in exchange for bringing in a disco record to be blown up between games. The first game had a number of delays after fans threw their records, fireworks and beer cans onto the field, while the between-games explosion tore a large hole into the field, which was followed by thousands of fans invading the field, which resulted in a near-riot. Thirty-seven fans were arrested, and the second game of the doubleheader was forfeited to the Tigers.

Mike Milbury

- 23 December – At the end of a game between the New York Rangers and the Boston Bruins at Madison Square Garden, Bruins players climbed into the stands to fight with Rangers fans after Stan Jonathan was hit across the face with a rolled up program and Terry O'Reilly's stick was stolen. This incident was made infamous by Mike Milbury removing a fan's shoe and beating him with it. Four Rangers fans were arrested, with O'Reilly suspended for eight games and Milbury and Peter McNab for six games by NHL president John Ziegler; all three players were also fined $500.

=== 1980 ===
- 19 January – During a bench-clearing brawl involving the Edmonton Oilers and the Pittsburgh Penguins, drunk Pittsburgh fans behind the Edmonton bench threw beer at Edmonton head coach Glen Sather, who attempted to attack the fans when the plexiglass collapsed.
- 7 April – During a VFL match between St Kilda and Hawthorn at Moorabbin Oval, St Kilda captain Garry Sidebottom was hit across the right eye by a beer can thrown by a drunk Hawthorn fan; Sidebottom required medical attention, but was able to continue in the match.
- 10 May – At the end of the 1980 Scottish Cup Final between Celtic and Rangers at Hampden Park (which Celtic won 1–0 after extra time), celebrating Celtic fans invaded the pitch; after a group of drunk Rangers fans did the same, a sustained brawl between the rival groups ensued, with mounted police being called in to break up the battling fans. This incident led to the banning of alcohol from Scottish football grounds, which remains in place outside enclosed executive boxes.
- 5 October – During the Hardie-Ferodo Bathurst 1000 race, Dick Johnson crashed heavily into a wall on lap 17 of the race while leading after hitting a football-sized rock that had been accidentally kicked onto the track by drunk Holden fans, writing off his car. A distraught Johnson subsequently appeared on live television stating he had dedicated all of his finances in a final shot at winning the race after ten years as a competent mid-fielder. Telecaster ATN7 set up a telethon to raise money to get Johnson back into racing in 1981; he won the Bathurst 1000 and the ATCC that year.

=== 1981 ===
- 24 September – During a game between the San Francisco Giants and the Los Angeles Dodgers at Candlestick Park, Dodgers outfielder Reggie Smith jumped into the stands after Giants fan Michael Dooley threw a helmet at him. Smith was ejected, and eight fans received citations.

=== 1982 ===
- 20 March – With 49 seconds remaining in a 3–3 tie game between the Vancouver Canucks and the Quebec Nordiques home team, a Nordiques fan reached over the plexiglass and punched Tiger Williams of the Canucks when he was in an altercation with Peter Šťastný. Some Canucks players charged towards the stands but were restrained by Quebec police and security. The fan was ejected from the arena. Coach Harry Neale was suspended and Roger Neilson took the team to their first Stanley Cup finals.
- 13 November – During the second day of the first Ashes test between Australia and England at the WACA, a group of drunk and drug-affected English fans invaded the pitch after England had passed 400 in its first innings. One fan, 19-year-old Gary Donnison, hit Australian fast bowler Terry Alderman in the face, and Alderman chased Donnison before trying to tackle him, leaving Alderman with a dislocated shoulder and having to be carried off on a stretcher; teammates Dennis Lillee and Allan Border tripped up Donnison and pinned him to the ground until police and security arrived. Alderman spent 18 months on the sidelines before returning in mid-1984, Donnison and another 25 fans were arrested, and a further 150 were ejected.

=== 1984 ===
- 19 May – An Edmonton Oilers fan threw a beer cup at Duane Sutter of the New York Islanders while he was in the penalty box. Sutter squirted the fan back with a water bottle, but a second Oilers fan retaliated with a Dixie cup. The second fan was ejected from the arena hours before the Oilers won the Stanley Cup for the first time.
- 12 August – "Braves–Padres bean brawl" – At an Atlanta Braves home game, the San Diego Padres tried to instigate a beanball war against Pascual Perez after he hit Alan Wiggins with the very first pitch of the game, and fans got into the act late. A drunken Padres fan ran onto the field and attempted to take a loose helmet near third base as a souvenir before being tackled by Braves Chris Chambliss and Jerry Royster, who restrained the fan until police arrived. Five fans were arrested after running onto the field to participate in a bench-clearing brawl, during which a Braves fan slammed a beer mug on Padre Kurt Bevacqua's head. Bevacqua gave chase before being restrained by security and police, and the game ended with riot police on top of both dugouts in an attempt to keep fans away from the players, as well as both teams having to go to their locker rooms prematurely. Seventeen players were ejected, the bulk of them from the Padres, along with both teams' managers and two San Diego replacement managers, Ozzie Virgil Sr. and Jack Krol. The fan who slammed the beer mug on Bevacqua's head was charged with assault and battery: Padres manager Dick Williams was suspended for nine games and fined $10,000 by Major League Baseball for having instigated the beanball war, and Braves manager Joe Torre and five players were all suspended for three games.

=== 1985 ===
- 5 January – In an FA Cup fifth-round match between Leicester City and Burton Albion, drunk City fans threw beer cups from the terraces, one of which knocked Albion's goalkeeper unconscious and left him having to be carried off the pitch on a stretcher. With no substitutes left for Albion, City easily won 6–1; however, The English FA declared the match null and void and ordered a replay at a neutral venue behind closed doors. After only agreeing to play by the casting vote of their manager, City won the replay 1–0 on 16 January at Coventry's Highfield Road.
- 13 March – The 1985 Kenilworth Road riot. In an FA Cup sixth round match between Luton and Millwall, the visiting fans rioted before, during and after the game. The home fans were not guiltless. The Luton goalkeeper was hit on the head by a missile. Eighty-one people were injured, 31 of them police.
- 23 March – Before a Hibernian versus Aberdeen match, the Capital City Service and the Aberdeen Soccer Casuals clashed on Easter Road resulting in one Hibs casual being seriously assaulted and taken to hospital in a comatose state. At halftime, it was rumoured he had died, and the atmosphere at the game quickly soured. During the second half, Aberdeen fans and players were subject to a barrage of missiles such as bottles, stones, coins, iron bolts and golf balls; Aberdeen goalkeeper Jim Leighton was hit on the neck with an iron bolt, teammate Alex McLeish was struck by a coin and a linesman was hit on the head with a lump of concrete, leading the referee to stop the match until order was restored. He was quoted as saying the scenes in the ground were "the worst I've ever witnessed".
- 4 May – During a VFL reserves match at Lake Oval between Collingwood and the Sydney Swans, Collingwood full-back John Bourke kicked Swans ruckman Patrick Foy in the groin in reaction to Foy tagging him throughout the game. When field umpire Phil Waight went to order off Bourke for the incident, Bourke pushed Waight to the ground and kicked him, struck the Collingwood runner in the face, and ran into the stands to assault a Swans fan who Bourke claimed had repeatedly taunted him. Bourke was suspended for 10 years plus 16 games by the VFL, which was later commuted to seven years; Bourke was later pleaded guilty to one count of assault and was found guilty by a magistrate of a second count of assault against Waight and was fined $2,000.
- 29 May – Heysel Stadium disaster: A major brawl erupted before the European Cup Final between Liverpool F.C. and Juventus FC where 39 fans died (32 Italian) and 600 were injured after being smashed against the security wall before the start of the match. Despite this, the match was played. English teams were banned from playing in continental competitions for five years and Liverpool were banned for six years.

=== 1986 ===
- 12 February – With 58 seconds remaining in an NHL game between the New York Rangers and the Vancouver Canucks at Madison Square Garden, hecklers poured beer and soft drinks over the Canucks' bench, causing a five-minute delay; Craig Coxe attempted to retaliate, but was restrained by his teammates and security. One fan, Patrick Nugent, was arrested and another six fans were ejected.
- 21 June – At the end of a VFL match between Collingwood and Sydney at Victoria Park, which Sydney won by one point, umpires, Swans players and officials, and police were assaulted, spat on, and pelted with beer cans by angry Collingwood fans, who also attempted to kick in the door to the Swans locker room and fought with Swans fans in the stands. Field umpire Peter Howe and two police officers were injured, with one fan being arrested and five ejected.
- 26 August – A fan threw a Bowie hunting knife at California Angels rookie Wally Joyner at Yankee Stadium; Joyner was hit on his left arm by the butt end of the knife, escaping injury.

=== 1987 ===
- During Game 4 of the Eastern Conference finals between the Boston Celtics and Detroit Pistons at the Pontiac Silverdome, fans began throwing ice and beer cups onto the court after Larry Bird was ejected for responding to a hard foul by Bill Laimbeer by throwing at least two punches and the basketball at Laimbeer's head. Fans continued to throw debris at Bird as he walked back to the locker room.

=== 1988 ===
- 30 April – With the score tied at 5–5 in the ninth inning of a Major League Baseball game between the Cincinnati Reds and the New York Mets, first base umpire Dave Pallone called New York Mets outfielder Mookie Wilson safe on a delayed call, with the delay giving Howard Johnson the time to score the eventual game-winning run. Reds manager Pete Rose immediately rushed from the dugout to argue with Pallone about the call and how slowly it was made, but after Pallone mocked Rose's gestures by pointing his finger at Rose, Rose accused Pallone of poking him in the eye and shoved him. Pallone promptly ejected Rose and Reds fans responded by booing and throwing beer cups, golf balls, coins, garbage, and various other objects onto the field and at Pallone, causing a 14-minute delay before being warned that the game would be declared a forfeit to the Mets. Pallone was removed from the game for his own safety, while Rose was suspended for 30 games and fined $10,000 by Major League Baseball for the incident.

=== 1989 ===
- 27 September – Iron rod incident (Dutch: Staafincident): During a UEFA Cup match between Ajax Amsterdam and Austria Wien at De Meer Stadion, Austrian goalkeeper Franz Wohlfahrt was struck by a metal iron rod which was thrown onto the pitch by a member of the Ajax hooligan firm F-side. As a result, Ajax forfeited the match and was excluded from competing in European football for a year.
- 1 October – During a game between the Cleveland Browns and the Denver Broncos at Cleveland Stadium, officials had the teams switch end zones in the fourth quarter to protect Denver players from batteries and other objects being thrown from the Dawg Pound. The switch put the wind at the Browns' back, and the Browns wound up winning on a field goal that barely cleared the crossbar.
- 10 December – Week 14 of the 1989 NFL season saw two notable fan incidents occur almost simultaneously.
  - During Bounty Bowl II at Veterans Stadium, Philadelphia Eagles fans threw snowballs, chunks of ice, and various other objects at Dallas Cowboys players and officials as revenge against accusations by Cowboys coach Jimmy Johnson that Eagles coach Buddy Ryan had placed a "bounty" on the head of Cowboys placekicker Luis Zendejas during the teams' previous meeting. Back judge Al Jury and Cowboys punter Mike Saxon were both knocked to the ground by a barrage of snowballs. CBS broadcasters Verne Lundquist and Terry Bradshaw had to dodge snowballs aimed at the broadcast booth (at one point, with the cameras focused on them, Bradshaw took one and threw it against the wall so viewers could see just how dangerous the snowballs were), while at the end of the game Lundquist claimed on-air that a recent root canal surgery had been more pleasant than broadcasting the Eagles. Johnson was booed, pelted with various objects, and had beer poured on him as he was escorted from the field by Philadelphia Police officers at the end of the game. The Eagles upgraded security at the stadium and banned beer sales for their last home game of the season.
  - Meanwhile, Cincinnati Bengals fans, angered by what they perceived as a bad call, booed and threw beer bottles and various objects at officials and Seattle Seahawks players. The Seahawks, who were backed up deep in their own territory, refused to play until the field was cleared; during a 10-minute delay, Bengals coach Sam Wyche addressed the crowd. Alluding to how boorish their in-state rivals were just two months earlier, he angrily reminded Bengals fans "You don't live in Cleveland, you live in Cincinnati!"

=== 1990 ===
- 24 March – During a WHL playoff game between the Seattle Thunderbirds and the Tri-City Americans at a packed Seattle Center Coliseum, Americans players responded to heckling and beer throwing from Thunderbirds fans by swinging sticks at them behind the bench; fans were able to gain control of several players' sticks. The Americans coach, Rick Kozuback, and Americans players Terry Virtue, Steve Jacques and Jeff Fancy were given game misconduct penalties and suspended for their role in the melee. A police officer and an Americans fan were injured, with four fans being arrested and another five being ejected.
- 15 May – With 2:52 remaining in the second quarter in Game 6 of the 1990 PBA First Conference finals between the Añejo Rhum 65ers and Shell Rimula X Zoom Masters (the latter leading the series 3–2), 65ers playing coach Robert Jaworski went to the officials table to protest the unfavorable officiating after 65ers enforcer Rey Cuenco was ejected for a second technical for tapping on the nape of a referee, angry that his team had more fouls than Shell in just the first half alone. As photographers and cameramen ran towards him, the predominant and angry Añejo crowd booed and threw various objects on the court, forcing play to be stopped, and the 65ers walked back to their locker room, with team manager Bernabe Navarro leading the walkout. After order was restored, PBA Commissioner Rudy Salud gave both teams 10 minutes to go back on the court but the 65ers refused to do so and, after two 90-second ultimatums, the Zoom Masters were declared winners by forfeit, and champions. Despite Navarro saying that the decision to walk out was from fears that something worse would happen if his team continued on with the game, the 65ers were fined a total of P550,000 for the forfeit.

=== 1991 ===
- 11 May – During a game between the Cleveland Indians and the California Angels at Cleveland Stadium, Indians outfielder Albert Belle threw a ball into the stands that hit a heckler, Jeff Pillar, in the chest. Pillar suffered minor bruising, while Belle was ejected, suspended for six games and fined $50,000 by Major League Baseball.

=== 1992 ===
- 12 April – During a match between the Buffalo Sabres and the Quebec Nordiques, Buffalo Sabres forward Rob Ray fought a fan who had entered the visitors bench on a bet. The fan was severely beaten before police intervened.
- 16 November – During an FA Cup first-round replay between Peterborough United and Kingstonian, a Peterborough fan threw a missile which knocked Kingstonian's goalkeeper unconscious and left him having to be carried off the pitch on a stretcher. With no substitute goalkeeper available, Peterborough was able to win easily, with a final score of 9–1; however, The Football Association declared the match null and void, and ordered a rematch with no fans present. Peterborough won the replay 1–0 on 21 November.

=== 1993 ===
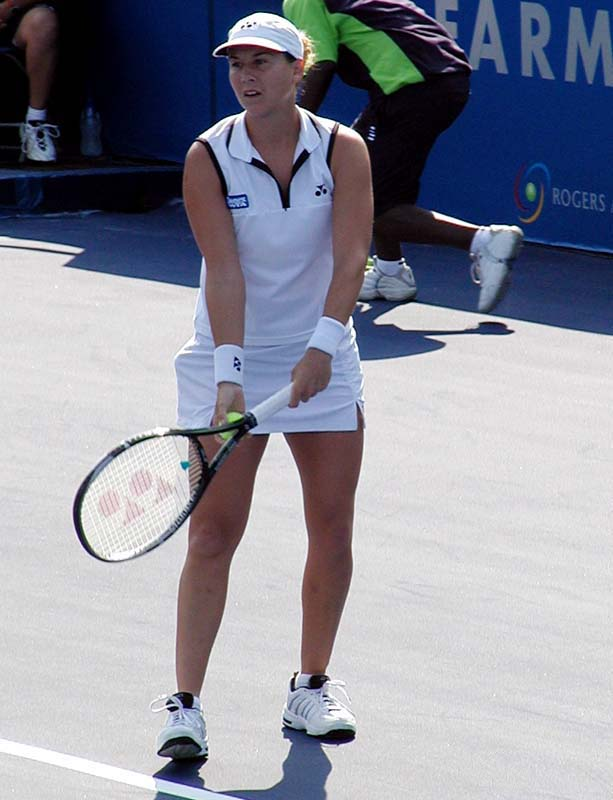
Monica Seles

- 30 April – During a changeover in a tennis match in Hamburg, Germany, tennis star Monica Seles was stabbed in the back by Günter Parche, a fan of Steffi Graf.

=== 1995 ===
- 25 January – After French Manchester United player Eric Cantona had been sent off for kicking an opponent during a game against Crystal Palace, Palace fan Matthew Simmons left his seat and came down to the touchline shouting racist abuse at Cantona as he walked off the pitch; in response, Cantona ran over and launched a chest-high kick at Simmons and landed several punches before police and security separated them, with Cantona being given a second red card. Cantona was banned for the remainder of the FA Premier League season and fined £50,000; he was also convicted of assault and ordered to perform 120 hours of community service.
- 6 February – During a timeout in an NBA game between the Portland Trail Blazers and the Houston Rockets at Portland Memorial Coliseum, Houston Rockets guard Vernon Maxwell ran a dozen rows into the stands and punched a fan, Steve George, in the face; Maxwell claimed George had heckled him over his wife's recent miscarriage. George suffered a broken jaw, while Maxwell was ejected, suspended for 10 games and fined $20,000 by the NBA.
- 30 July – California Angels player Chili Davis hit a spectator who he believed was heckling him at Milwaukee County Stadium. Others in the crowd claim Davis hit the wrong man. He was fined $5,000.
- 31 July – Arkansas Travelers players Dmitri Young and Keith Jones entered the crowd during or after a game in Wichita, Kansas. Young punched a fan in the face and Jones hit a fan with a bat before both were restrained. Witnesses claimed hecklers were calling Young "pork chop" but Young later said they were shouting racial slurs. Both players were suspended.
- 28 September – Chicago Cubs pitcher Randy Myers was attacked on the mound by a fan, John Murray, at Wrigley Field after giving up a home run; Myers, well known for his martial arts skills, easily subdued his attacker and held him on the ground until authorities arrested him. Murray was charged with assault and disorderly conduct; Cubs shortstop Shawon Dunston, the first person on the scene, told the AP that, knowing which teammate was being attacked, he feared Myers might seriously injure or even kill the fan.
- 23 December – With the San Diego Chargers leading 27–17 during the fourth quarter of a game against the New York Giants at Giants Stadium, intoxicated Giants fans threw hundreds of snowballs and chunks of ice at Chargers players and team officials, injuring fifteen people, while Chargers equipment manager Sid Brooks was knocked unconscious and had to be removed from the stadium on a stretcher. Fifteen people were arrested and an additional 175 were ejected, with 75 fans having their season tickets revoked.

=== 1996 ===
- 18 May – During a derby between S.L. Benfica and Sporting CP for the Portuguese Cup final, Rui Mendes (a fan of Sporting) died when he was hit inside the stadium by a very light thrown by Hugo Inácio (a member of the No Name Boys).
- 11 July – After Riddick Bowe had been given a 7th round victory by referee Wayne Kelly due to the disqualification of Andrew Golota following a series of blows by Golota the referee ruled low or illegal at Madison Square Garden in New York City, fighting between corners of the two boxers began in the ring, and was soon joined by fans from the stands. At one point, Golota was struck in the head with a cellular phone. Several fans were injured or arrested and Golota's manager, Lou Duva, was hospitalized for observation.
- 26 November – In an NHL game between the Calgary Flames and the Edmonton Oilers at Northlands Coliseum, Flames forward Sasha Lakovic attempted to climb the glass behind the players' bench to get back at a drunk Oilers fan who had spilled beer over assistant coach Guy Lapointe. Lakovic was restrained by his teammates, received a misconduct penalty and was suspended for two games. The NHL fined the Oilers $20,000 for having inadequate security. The fan was ultimately ejected from the arena. The incident was broadcast on the CBC.

=== 1997 ===
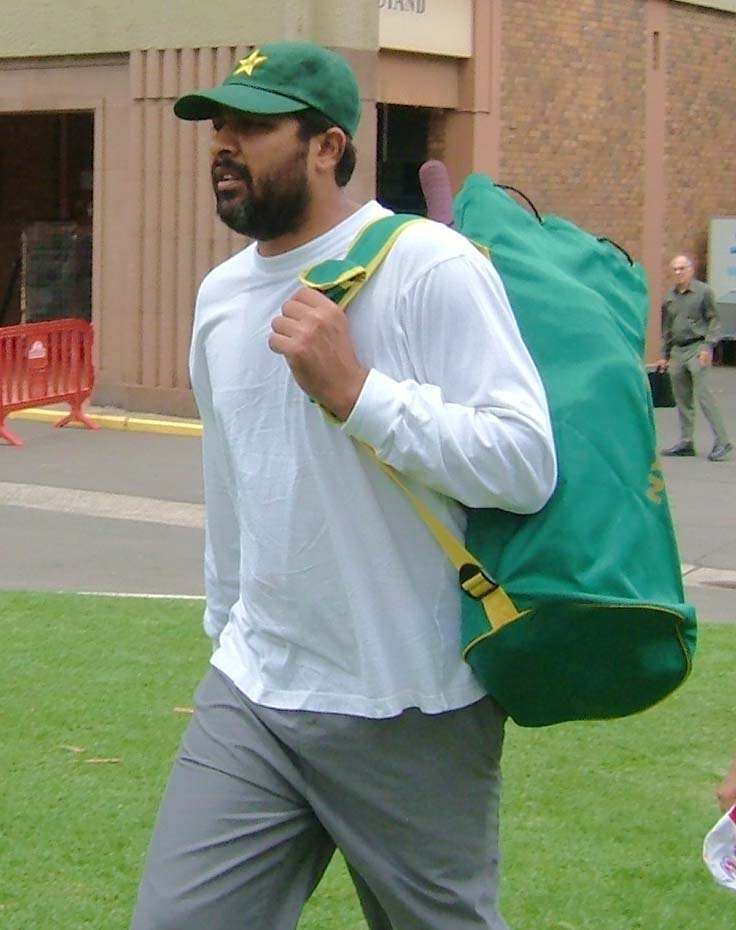
Inzamam-Ul-Haq

- During a cricket match between India and Pakistan in Toronto, Ontario, Canada, an Indian fan repeatedly called Pakistan captain Inzamam-ul-Haq a "potato" over a megaphone as he fielded on the boundary; Inzamam grabbed a bat and ran into the stands while swinging it before being reset by security, but no-one was hit.

=== 1999 ===
- 2 May – During the deciding match of the Scottish Premier League season, between Celtic and Rangers at Celtic Park, which Rangers won 3–0, referee Hugh Dallas was struck in the head with a missile, causing him to need attention for a cut, and a drunk Celtic fan shouting abuse at Dallas from the upper tier fell over the balcony to the lower tier. Rangers players were also booed and pelted with various objects by Celtic fans while leaving the pitch at the end of the bad-tempered match which saw three players shown a red card (ejected). On four separate occasions, intoxicated Celtic fans also invaded the pitch and attempted to attack Dallas and other Rangers players; they were arrested and banned from Celtic Park for life. The match was shown live on Sky Sports on a Sunday evening. The authorities subsequently decided that whenever possible, fixtures between the rivals (known as the Old Firm) should be played on Saturday morning so supporters would have less opportunity to drink to excess prior to the event – alcohol was already banned from Scottish football stadia following the events of 1980 involving the same two clubs – and scheduled as early as possible in the calendar to lessen the probability of its outcome directly deciding the league title.
- 24 September – During a game between the Houston Astros and the Milwaukee Brewers at Milwaukee County Stadium, Astros outfielder Billy Spiers was attacked by a drunk fan, Bert W. Visgar, while standing in right field. Spiers suffered slight injuries, and Visgar was sentenced to 90 days in jail.
- 22 November – After having been pelted with snowballs throughout the second half of a game against the Denver Broncos, Charles Woodson of the Oakland Raiders retaliated by throwing a snowball back into the crowd, hitting a woman in the face. An arrest warrant was later issued for Woodson. Raiders tackle Lincoln Kennedy later ran into the stands and punched a drunk Broncos fan, who had thrown a snowball at him, in the face. The fan was ejected from the stadium.

=== 2000 ===
- 7 April – During a Davis Cup rubber between Chile and Argentina held in what later became the Movistar Arena, the Chilean crowd booed the Argentinian team and pelted Argentinian players and officials with fruit, coins, and plastic chairs, causing numerous delays. The Chilean Tennis Federation were fined US$50,000 for the incident and having inadequate security, and then lost the home court rights for two years.
- 16 May – During a game between the Chicago Cubs and the Los Angeles Dodgers at Wrigley Field in Chicago, drunk Cubs fans poured beer over Dodgers players sitting on the bench, and a drunk Cubs fan grabbed the cap off the head of the Dodgers' Chad Kreuter, starting a bench-clearing brawl in which Dodgers players entered the stands to fight with Cubs fans. Sixteen players and three coaches were ejected and suspended for a total of 76 games.

== 21st century ==
=== 2001 ===
- 29 March – During a game between the Toronto Maple Leafs and the Philadelphia Flyers at the First Union Center, a drunk Flyers fan, Chris Falcone, leaned over the glass which separated fans from the penalty box to confront Leafs player Tie Domi after Domi had shot water at a heckler. A scuffle ensued after the glass panel came loose, and Falcone's momentum carried him into the box where Domi had been seated. Domi was restrained by officials and fined $1,000 by the NHL for the incident, while Falcone was ejected from the arena, received a police citation and was fined $150.
- 17 April – Near the end of a one-day international between England and Pakistan at Headingley, hundreds of fans invaded the pitch, and a steward was kicked and hit repeatedly while attempting to protect the stumps; he was left with broken ribs and a dislocated shoulder and had to be carried from the pitch on a stretcher. English captain Alec Stewart conceded the game on safety grounds 15 minutes later with Pakistan still two runs short of their target of 157. Several arrests were made.
- 16 December – Bottlegate – During an NFL game between the Cleveland Browns and the Jacksonville Jaguars, the referees took the unusual step of reviewing a play that had happened a play earlier, citing technical difficulties (normally under NFL rules, only the last play made can be reviewed). Browns fans angered by the overturning of the call on that play with 48 seconds left in the fourth quarter threw beer bottles, cups and garbage onto the field, with officials as well as players on both teams being hit, resulting in a 22-minute delay. Initially, the game was called, with CBS announcers Gus Johnson and Brent Jones highly critical of the fans' conduct and the officials' handling of the incident. At least three Browns fans who attempted to run onto the field to remonstrate with officials were arrested, a number of Browns fans were ejected, and Commissioner Paul Tagliabue later ordered the final 48 seconds to be played.

=== 2002 ===
- 5 January – Late in the second half of a college basketball game between Texas and Oklahoma State at Gallagher-Iba Arena, Texas guard T. J. Ford collided with a pregnant woman while chasing a loose ball from going out of bounds. A man, later identified as the woman's husband, then grabbed Ford by the throat and attacked him, causing several Longhorn players to intervene, with Longhorn forward James Thomas delivering several punches to the fan. No players were ejected, but a technical foul was assessed to Texas for having a player leave the bench, and Texas went on to win 70–61. No charges were filed against the fan or Longhorn players.
- 10 August – During a rugby union Tri Nations match at the ABSA Stadium between South Africa and New Zealand, a drunk South African fan, Pieter van Zyl, scaled a perimeter fence, ran onto the pitch and tackled the referee, David McHugh of Ireland, leaving McHugh with a dislocated shoulder and having to be carried from the pitch on a stretcher. All Blacks flanker Richie McCaw wrestled him to the ground until police and security arrested him. van Zyl was convicted of trespassing and assault, and was sentenced to three months in jail, fined $275, and banned for life from attending rugby matches in South Africa.
- 18 August – At the end of an AFL match between Richmond and Hawthorn, a female stalker of five years on a restraining order ran onto the field to approach Richmond's Greg Stafford and tried to embrace him before he pushed her away and summoned security and police, who ejected the woman from the arena. The incident sparked much media attention as Stafford raised the issue of player security.
- 16 September – A fight broke out amongst fans at FedExField during a Monday Night Football game between the Philadelphia Eagles and the Washington Redskins with six and a half minutes remaining in the fourth quarter. Police broke up the fight by using pepper spray, but the mist hit air blowers near the Eagles bench which affected the players, resulting in an eight-minute delay of the game.
- 19 September – During a game between the Chicago White Sox and the Kansas City Royals at Comiskey Park in Chicago, Royals first base coach Tom Gamboa was violently assaulted by 34-year-old William Ligue Jr. and his 15-year-old son, William Ligue III.
- 23 November – As tensions between the two teams built throughout a penalty-filled college football game between Hawaii and Cincinnati at Aloha Stadium in Honolulu, a controversial late hit on the already injured Hawaii quarterback Timmy Chang caused a bench-clearing brawl which also involved both teams' mascots. Cincinnati's athletic director Bob Goin accused Hawaii fans of threatening Cincinnati players, coaches, and cheerleaders, and police used pepper spray on fans who threw beer cups and garbage at Cincinnati players after the game.

=== 2003 ===
- 15 April – During a game between the Chicago White Sox and the Kansas City Royals in Chicago, which was the first meeting between the two teams at the newly renamed U.S. Cellular Field since the Tom Gamboa incident, four fans ran on the field and disrupted play, with the last fan running onto the field (mid-play) and trying to tackle first base umpire Laz Diaz; Diaz, a former Marine, easily threw the fan to the ground.
- 19 April – During a game at Oakland's Network Associates Coliseum, Texas Rangers right fielder Carl Everett threw a watch that was on the field back into the stands, and the watch hit a male fan by accident, giving him a cut on his head. When Everett tried to apologize to the fan, the latter responded by hitting the former in the back of the head with a cell phone. The fan who threw the phone was arrested.
- 26 April – During a League One match between Queens Park Rangers F.C. and Crewe at Loftus Road, a beer can and a coin were thrown at the referee, Andy Hall; at the end of the match, which ended in a 0–0 draw that ensured Crewe's promotion and saw two QPR players ejected, a pitch invasion occurred, with a QPR fan running onto the pitch to remonstrate with and abuse Hall before being ejected from the arena.
- 17 May – During a Czech First League association football match between AC Sparta Prague and FC Bohemians Prague, a drunk fan climbed over the fence, ran onto the pitch, and repeatedly hit an assistant referee with fists (after Bohemians conceded a goal from a suspected offside). The match was abandoned and afterwards forfeited as a 3–0 win for Sparta, with Sparta claiming the league championship and Bohemians losing the last chance of avoiding relegation to the second league; the fan was later jailed for three years (for this and other offenses).
- 11 October – At the end of a college football game between the Nebraska Cornhuskers and the Missouri Tigers in Columbia, Missouri, celebrating Missouri fans invaded the field, and Nebraska cornerback Kellen Huston punched a Missouri fan, Matthew Scott, in the face, knocking Scott unconscious and leaving him having to be carried from the field on a stretcher; Scott also required surgery for a broken nose. Huston was suspended for one game and fined $500 in court after pleading guilty to a Class B misdemeanor charge of public disturbance of fighting.
- 1 November – In the late stages of a pool match in the 2003 Rugby World Cup between South Africa and Samoa at Suncorp Stadium in Brisbane, a drunk Samoan fan ran onto the pitch and attempted to tackle Springbok Louis Koen around the legs as he was kicking a goal. Koen kicked the goal, and inadvertently knocked the fan unconscious with a kick to the head, leaving him having to be taken from the field on a stretcher.

=== 2004 ===
- 26 March – During an NRL game between the Canterbury Bulldogs and the Sydney Roosters at Aussie Stadium, Roosters player Brett Finch threw a full drink bottle back into the crowd after being pelted with missiles by Bulldogs fans. One fan was subsequently banned from attending NRL matches for life on video evidence, while Finch was ejected and suspended for three games.
- 29 August – During the men's marathon event at the 2004 Summer Olympics, defrocked Irish-born priest Neil Horan burst out of the crowd to accost race leader Vanderlei de Lima. The action may have cost de Lima the gold medal, although many observers have noted that Stefano Baldini of Italy and Mebrahtom Keflezighi of the United States were gaining on him before the attack. De Lima ultimately placed third in the race behind Baldini and Keflezighi. De Lima later declined to protest the result, for which the IOC compensated him with the De Coubertin medal. Fellow Brazilian and Olympic beach volleyball player Emanuel Rego, who won the gold medal at the 2004 Olympic Games, was so impressed with de Lima's sportsmanship that he gave his gold medal to de Lima on television on 1 July 2005. A deeply and visibly touched Vanderlei returned it, saying "I can't accept Emanuel's medal. I'm happy with mine, it's bronze but means gold".
- 13 September – During a game between the Oakland Athletics and the Texas Rangers at Network Associates Coliseum in Oakland, Rangers pitcher Frank Francisco was ejected, arrested, and charged with assault and battery after he threw a metal chair into the stands that hit a fan, Jennifer Bueno, breaking her nose and causing a gash which required stitches. Bueno's husband had allegedly heckled Rangers pitcher Doug Brocail about his stillborn baby. Other Rangers pitchers, including Carlos Almanzar, also tried to enter the crowd. Francisco was released on $15,000 bail and suspended for the remainder of the season by MLB. He pleaded no contest to the charges, and was sentenced to anger management classes and a work program; in 2007, he settled a civil suit brought by Bueno.
- 18 September – In the AFL Cairns Grand Final between the North Cairns Tigers and the Port Douglas Crocs at Cazaly's Stadium, a wild and violent 15 minute bench-clearing brawl erupted after Tigers players charged at the Crocs pre-match huddle at the end of the national anthem, and escalated when fans and team officials became involved. One fan was arrested and another five were ejected, while three Crocs players and a Crocs runner were left unconscious and had to be carried from the arena on stretchers. After a lengthy AFL investigation, the instigator, North Cairns Tigers coach Jason Love was suspended for eight years, and the 22 North Cairns players were suspended for a total of 400 matches; the Tigers were forced to forfeit their first match of 2005 as a result of these suspensions. AFL Cairns declared the Grand Final a "no result" and withheld the 2004 premiership.
- 29 September – After a fan threw a plastic beer bottle onto the field during a game between the Los Angeles Dodgers and the Colorado Rockies at Dodger Stadium, Milton Bradley of the Dodgers threw it back into the front row. As Bradley walked to the Dodgers' dugout after being ejected, he took his jersey and hat off, and with the crowd behind the dugout booing, Bradley gestured with palms up, urging the fans on. Major League Baseball suspended Bradley for five games.
- 19 October – In Game 6 of the American League Championship Series between the Boston Red Sox and the New York Yankees, Yankee third baseman Alex Rodriguez grounded a ball to Red Sox pitcher Bronson Arroyo, who picked up the ball and ran to the baseline to tag Rodriguez out, but Rodriguez slapped Arroyo's arm, knocking the ball loose and causing Derek Jeter to score. After the umpires consulted, Rodríguez was called out for interference and Jeter was ordered back to first, thus wiping out the score. The call incensed the Yankee fans, who began to throw balls and other debris onto the field. Boston manager Terry Francona pulled his players from the field to protect them. After a delay, order was restored, but in the top of the ninth, after a leadoff single, the Yankees attempted to turn a double play. However, on a very close play, Orlando Cabrera was called safe at first base. This was the third time in the game that the frustrated New York fan base had a close call go against their team, and they again showered the field with debris, causing NYPD officers to begin streaming out of the dugouts and take the field in full riot gear. The police remained on the field, near the first and third base walls, for the remainder of the top of the ninth.
- 19 November – The Malice at the Palace: one of American sports' most infamous incidents. Near the end of an NBA game between the Indiana Pacers and the Detroit Pistons at The Palace of Auburn Hills, a fight broke out on the court between the Pistons' Ben Wallace and the Pacers' Ron Artest after Artest fouled Wallace from behind. As the on-court fight died down, a fan threw a drink at Artest while he was lying on the scorer's table. Artest then ran into the stands, as did his teammates (most prominently Stephen Jackson and Jermaine O'Neal), causing a huge brawl between players and spectators. Some fans came onto the court, leading to additional fights with Pacer players. The remaining 45 seconds were called off and the Pacers, who led by 15 points at the time, were awarded the win. Pacer players and coaching personnel were pelted with beverages and garbage as they raced into the locker rooms. Nine players received a total of 146 games worth of suspensions, the bulk of it aimed at the Pacers, and five fans were banned from attending Palace Sports and Entertainment events for life. Five Indiana players and five fans were charged with assault and battery.

=== 2005 ===
- 12 April – In the 74th minute of a UEFA Champions League match between crosstown rivals Inter Milan, A.C. Milan goalkeeper Dida was hit in the shoulder with a flare thrown from the Inter fans to protest the disallowing of an Esteban Cambiasso equaliser. Dida suffered only minor burns, but was unable to continue the match. After burning flares were cleared from the pitch, causing a 30-minute delay, the match was briefly restarted before another round of debris-throwing forced the abandonment of the match. A.C. Milan's 1–0 lead was allowed to stand and they progressed.
- 14 April – A fan at Fenway Park took a swing at Yankees right fielder Gary Sheffield as he was fielding a ball in play, prompting Sheffield to take a swing at the fan. While this was happening, another fan threw beer at Sheffield, then jumped back tripping over the fan next to him. After throwing the ball back into the field of play, Sheffield approached the fan who threw a punch at him, before security intervened. The fan was ejected from the stadium and had his season tickets revoked.
- 30 November – During the first ODI in the Chappell–Hadlee series between Australia and New Zealand at Eden Park, Auckland, drunk New Zealand fans threw fruit, beer bottles, tennis balls and golf balls at Australian players. Five fans and five streakers were arrested and another 40 were ejected.

=== 2006 ===
- 28 May – During an AFL match between North Melbourne and St Kilda at Telstra Dome, a North Melbourne fan had provocative confrontations with coach Dean Laidley at half-time and after the match. Laidley responded to the after-match confrontation with a verbal barrage and invited the fan into the club's locker rooms to see how badly the players were feeling due to their consistently poor on-field performance; the incident was shown live on Australian television. The fan committed suicide by throwing himself in the path of an oncoming train the next morning, with the man's family, Victoria Police, and North Melbourne officials stating the death was unrelated.
- 11 November – At an FA Cup match between Newport County and Swansea City, fourth official Alan Sheffield was struck in the head with a £1 coin thrown from the crowd after Sheffield and referee Tony Bates engaged in a dispute with Newport manager Peter Beadle, who had been ejected for abusing officials. The impact cut an artery, and Sheffield was rushed into surgery, requiring seven stitches. Several other coin-throwing incidents occurred during November, with Fulham's Claus Jensen and Arsenal's Robin van Persie also being hit with coins.

=== 2007 ===
- 21 January – In a Heineken Cup rugby union match between Toulouse and Ulster, Toulouse player Trevor Brennan ran into a section of the stands housing Ulster supporters and assaulted Ulster fan Patrick Bamford. Competition organiser European Rugby Cup found that Brennan was being baited over the standard of Brennan's Bar, which he co-owns in Toulouse. Brennan received a life ban from rugby, which was reduced to a five-year suspension, prompting his retirement. Bamford successfully sued The Guardian, among others, for libel concerning reports that suggested he had shouted sectarian abuse.
- 20 March – Following Chelsea's 2–1 victory over Tottenham in an FA Cup quarter-finals match at White Hart Lane, Chelsea midfielder Frank Lampard was attacked by Tottenham fan Tim Smith, who ran onto the pitch and threw a clumsy punch at him. Footage appears to show Lampard's teammate Didier Drogba stomping on Smith after Chelsea's fitness coach Rui Faria had wrestled Smith to the ground.
- 23 May – During an AHL playoff game, Kip Brennan of the Hershey Bears engaged in a fight with a drunk Manchester Monarchs fan who had attacked him in the penalty box, and ripped the fan's T-shirt. Brennan was restrained by officials, given a game misconduct penalty, and suspended for the remainder of the playoffs. The fan was ejected from the arena.
- 28 May – In the fourth quarter of Game 4 of the NBA Western Conference finals between the Utah Jazz and the San Antonio Spurs at EnergySolutions Arena in Salt Lake City, Jazz fans gave way to frustration, with most of it aimed at San Antonio Spurs swingman Manu Ginóbili and his flair for drawing fouls. Four technical fouls were called against Utah in the fourth quarter, and Jazz fans threw empty water bottles and garbage onto the court after head coach Jerry Sloan and guard Derek Fisher were both ejected for arguing with officials. After the Spurs won the game 91–79, Jazz fans threw beer cups and garbage at Spurs players and officials, with Spurs head coach Gregg Popovich being forced to rush his team straight into the locker room instead of submitting to post-game interviews. Two fans were arrested.
- 2 June – With the score tied 3–3 in the 89th minute of a UEFA European Football Championship qualifying match between Sweden and Denmark, a drunk Danish fan stormed the pitch and punched referee Herbert Fandel in the face before being restrained by Danish team officials. Fandel had awarded Sweden a penalty kick after Danish midfielder Christian Poulsen was sent off for punching Swedish striker Markus Rosenberg in the stomach. Following the attack, the match was abandoned, and UEFA later awarded Sweden a 3–0 victory. See UEFA Euro 2008 qualifier fan attack for more details.
- 20 June – During an exhibition match between South Melbourne and the Melbourne Victory at Bob Jane Stadium, South Melbourne player Andrew Bourakis was hit by a flare. 15 fans were ejected during the match.
- 25 July – In the top of the ninth inning in a game between the Angels and Athletics at Angel Stadium, a fan, Roland Flores, threw a water bottle that hit Mike Piazza after he had homered in the fifth inning; Piazza then pointed his bat in the stands at the fan he believed threw the water bottle to get the attention of security. Flores was arrested by the ballpark security, and Piazza pressed charges against Flores. Flores was sentenced to 30 days in jail and three years of probation on 27 March 2008.
- 3 October – Following Celtic's late goal in the Champions League Group D clash against A.C. Milan which resulted in a 2–1 victory, a drunk Celtic fan, Robert McHendry, ran from one side of the pitch to the other, making light contact to the shoulder of Milan goalkeeper Dida while running past him; Dida took a couple of steps in pursuit of McHendry before he went down clutching his face in apparent agony and had to be taken off the pitch on a stretcher. McHendry was banned from Celtic matches for life, and Celtic were fined 30,000 Swiss Francs for the incident. Dida was fined and suspended for two Champions League matches for simulation; the suspension was later reduced to one match on appeal. Several other Celtic fans destroyed advertising hoardings at the side of the pitch as they also tried to reach celebrating Celtic players on the pitch.

=== 2008 ===
- 22 March – At the end of a drawn yet heated IFA Premiership match between Ballymena and Lisburn Distillery at the Ballymena Showgrounds, chairs, beer bottles and a leg of lamb were thrown onto the pitch by Ballymena fans; Distillery were also booed and pelted with various objects by Ballymena fans upon leaving the pitch at the end of the match which saw two Ballymena players ejected. A wild brawl broke out in the tunnel involving players and team officials, with both teams' managers having to be restrained by officials, and referee Mark Courtney had to be escorted from the field under police protection.
- 24 July – During a minor league A-level baseball game, pitcher Julio Castillo of the Peoria Chiefs was ejected, arrested and charged with assault. After a heated argument with the Dayton Dragons manager which was broken up by the umpire, Castillo threw the ball at the Dragons dugout, but the ball struck a fan, Chris McCarthy, who was knocked out and had to be immediately taken to hospital; this incident resulted in a 10-minute bench-clearing brawl, and the game was delayed for one hour and nine minutes. Castillo was arraigned the next day, held on a $50,000 bond, and had to surrender his passport. On 6 August 2009, Castillo was sentenced to 30 days in jail, 3 years of probation, and was sent to anger management.
- 21 December – During a game between the Seattle Seahawks and the New York Jets in Seattle, the Jets' Shaun Ellis threw a large chunk of snow at Seahawks fans. Two days later, after the NFL fined Ellis $10,000 for his actions, Ellis claimed that it was "all in good fun."

=== 2009 ===
- 16 February – In an AHSAA high school basketball tournament game between Carver-Montgomery and Valley high schools at the ASU Acadome, a hard foul with 6:23 remaining in the game escalated into a wild bench-clearing brawl, and fights broke out in the stands before spilling over onto the court. Eleven people were arrested, with the game being declared null and void, and both teams being ejected from the playoffs: Carver-Montgomery were fined $2,600 and banned from tournaments for two years, while Montgomery were fined $3,900 and banned from tournaments for one year. Talladega High School were given a bye in the tournament as a result of the brawl.
- 21 March – During an Argentinian Primera C match between Barracas Bolívar and General Lamadrid, a heated argument broke out between three Lamadrid players, four Lamadrid team officials and Barracas fans on the touchline in reaction to taunting and abuse by Barracas fans with Barracas leading 3–0 in the 60th minute; this escalated into a brawl, and the remaining Lamadrid players ran over to defend their team-mates, sparking numerous brawls in and around the stands. After riot police, match officials, ground staff and other fans had restored order, all eleven Lamadrid players on the pitch and all seven of Lamadrid's substitutes were ejected, and the match was abandoned; Barracas were awarded the win. Lamadrid were forced to play with a team of reserve and youth players for their next match.
- 25 April – In an NHL playoff game between the New York Rangers and Washington Capitals at Washington's Verizon Center, Rangers head coach John Tortorella squirted a fan with a water bottle, threw another water bottle over the glass which hit an unsuspecting fan in the face, and made threatening gestures to the fan with a stick. Tortorella was suspended for one game.
- 16 May – With 33 seconds remaining in an NRL game between the St George Illawarra Dragons and the Canterbury Bulldogs, Bulldogs fans threw bottles onto the field and at officials to protest a video referee's decision that overruled a try, causing a five-minute delay.
- 18 May – At the end of an NRL game between the Wests Tigers and the Brisbane Broncos which the Broncos won 20–18, a drunk Tigers fan, Mark Edwards, who had waited on the sideline after climbing the fence with 20 seconds left, invaded the field and tackled referee Jared Maxwell before being detained by security. Edwards pleaded guilty to trespassing and assault, was put on a two-year good behaviour bond, fined $1,500, and banned from attending NRL games for life.
- 19 July – During the first half of his first game back at the Home Depot Center following a loan to A.C. Milan, Los Angeles Galaxy midfielder David Beckham was subjected to obscene chants by fans angered by his expressed desire to remain with the Italian club. At halftime, Beckham was restrained by security from trying to climb over a barrier to confront a drunk fan who had run onto the pitch. The invading fan was arrested and banned from attending LA Galaxy home games for life, while Beckham was fined $1,000 for the incident. The fan's life ban was later lifted on appeal.
- 12 August – Philadelphia Phillies center fielder Shane Victorino was hit by a beer cup while catching a pop-fly ball at Wrigley Field. Victorino and the Phillies filed a complaint with the Chicago Police Department; the fan was charged with two counts of misdemeanor battery.
- 16 October – During a Philippine Basketball Association game between the Burger King Whoppers and Smart Gilas at Araneta Coliseum in Quezon City, Philippines, Whoppers captain Wynne Arboleda ran into the stands and kicked and punched a fan, Alain Katigbak, who was shouting profanities at him after Arboleda had been ejected for committing his second flagrant foul. Arboleda was suspended for the rest of the 2009–2010 season plus the first game of the 2010–2011 season, fined PhP20,000 (US$428), and banned from attending games during his suspension by the PBA.

=== 2010 ===
- 31 January – Near the end of the fifth and final cricket one-day international between Australia and Pakistan at the WACA, a drunk Australian fan, David James Fraser, ran onto the field and tackled Pakistan's Khalid Latif before being detained by security. The Pakistani sports minister called for Cricket Australia to set up barriers and ban alcohol at Australian cricket grounds, and the ICC investigated the matter, clearing the WACA. Fraser pleaded guilty to trespassing and assault, was fined $9,000, and banned from the WACA for life. A second pitch invasion occurred earlier in the game, and another 24 fans were ejected.
- 20 February – During the 2010 Kor Royal Cup match between Muangthong United and Thai Port at Suphachalasai Stadium in Bangkok, Thailand, Thai Port fans threw firecrackers and bottles onto the pitch with Muangthong United leading 2–0 in the 81st minute, and a pitch invasion occurred in which Thai Port fans attacked fleeing Muangthong United fans, Muangthong United players, officials and stadium security before setting fire to Muangthong United's team flag and a team shirt in the centre of the pitch. Ten fans were injured.
- 23 February – Berea College and Indiana University-Southeast basketball players and fans swarmed the floor after a hard screen set by a Berea player as his team was bringing the ball up court. IU Southeast players then rushed to defend their fallen teammate and confronted and abused the opposing player, causing a massive bench-clearing brawl. Eleven players were ejected.
- 15 March – During the first period of a KHL playoff game between Avtomobilist Yekaterinburg and Salavat Yulaev Ufa at the Yekaterinburg Sports Palace, a drunk Avtomobilist fan climbed over the glass behind Salavat's bench and hit Salavat goaltender Vitaly Kolesnik over the head with a stick several times. Kolesnik was left with a concussion and with blood pouring down his face, and had to be escorted from the arena by medical personnel. The fan was arrested, while Avtomobilist were fined one million rubles ($33,500) by the KHL for having inadequate security.
- 6 June – The final game of the Greek Basket League finals at Peace and Friendship Stadium between ancient rivals Olympiacos and Panathinaikos (PAO), also respectively known as the "Reds" and "Greens" from their club colors, degenerated into what one commentator called a "night of shame" for Greek basketball. The game started 40 minutes late after police were forced to use tear gas on rioting Reds fans, reportedly incensed at what they considered to be biased officiating in the Greens' favor in Game 3. In the third quarter, with PAO leading 50–42, the game was halted for an hour after Reds fans threw various objects at the PAO bench. Reds fans again began throwing objects on the court with little over a minute left in the game and PAO ahead 76–69; officials ruled the game a forfeit to PAO, giving the Greens the title, and the new champions had to be escorted off the floor by riot police. League organizer HEBA fined Olympiacos €111,000, ordered them to play their first nine home games of the 2010–11 season behind closed doors and also banned TV coverage of these games.
- 26 December – During the 1st leg of the 2010 AFF Championship final between Malaysia and Indonesia in Kuala Lumpur, the match was stopped for eight minutes starting in the 53rd minute when the Indonesian players walked off in protest and complained to referee about laser light attacks from Malaysian fans, followed by firecracker explosion during the stoppage. The return-leg final in Jakarta saw Indonesian fans pointing green laser lights towards Malaysian goalkeeper face but the Malaysian did not complain about the lasers, as they have faced it before during an earlier group match against the Indonesian team.

=== 2011 ===
- 20 March – During a match between San Lorenzo and Vélez Sársfield of the Argentine Football Association, a riot broke out between rival fans at José Amalfitani Stadium. The catalyst to the violence was the beating death of unarmed San Lorenzo fan Ramon Aramayo by police at a security checkpoint at the stadium's entrance. Seven minutes into the game, San Lorenzo goalkeeper Pablo Migliore dropped to the ground after being struck in the head by an object thrown from the stands. Fans ripped apart a chain-link fence separating themselves from police before order was restored.
- 8 August – In an Arena Football League semi-final playoff game between the Georgia Force and Jacksonville Sharks, a drunk Sharks fan leaned over the wall separating the field from the stands and grabbed Force kick returner C. J. Johnson by his facemask, preventing him from running the ball out of the end zone. Officials called a touchback and assessed the home-team Sharks with a 15-yard penalty, and the fan was ejected from the arena.
- 30 October – In a Romanian soccer Liga I game between FC Petrolul Ploiești and FC Steaua București, when a penalty kick was awarded to Steaua, a Petrolul fan, Dragos Petrut Enache ran onto the field and hit Steaua defender George Galamaz in the face with a heavy object, breaking his cheekbone; Enache was attacked and kicked by two Steaua players, Novak Martinović and Răzvan Stanca, who both received red cards for retaliating. When the play resumed, Steaua converted the penalty kick to go up 2–0 and Petrolul fans started throwing flares onto the field, hitting and slightly injuring Steaua goalkeeper Ciprian Tătărușanu. At that point, the referee decided to abandon the game. Enache was arrested and jailed.
- 21 December – In the 36th minute of a fourth round match in the 2011–12 KNVB Cup between Eredivisie clubs Ajax and AZ at Amsterdam Arena, Ajax held a 1–0 lead when a fan ran onto the pitch and launched a karate kick from behind at AZ goalkeeper Esteban Alvarado, who responded by kicking the fan several times before security arrived and arrested the fan. When Alvarado was sent off for retaliating against his attacker, AZ walked off the pitch, and the match was abandoned. The KNVB rescinded the red card and ordered the match to be replayed in its entirety behind closed doors on 19 January 2012; Ajax was also fined €10,000 for failing to prevent the fan (who was supposed to be serving a three-year stadium ban) from entering the pitch, and given a suspended one-match spectator ban (not including the replay). Ajax accepted the penalties, and announced that it had given the fan an additional 30-year stadium ban and a lifetime ban from the club and its season ticket list.

=== 2012 ===
- 1 February – A soccer match turned ugly in Port Said, Egypt at the conclusion of the match where Port Said's al-Masry beat Cairo's Al-Ahly 3–1. Witnesses said trouble broke out when Ahly fans unfurled banners insulting Port Said, and an Ahly supporter descended onto the pitch carrying an iron bar. Al-Masry fans reacted first by attacking Ahli players, then opposing fans. Fights from the stands poured out onto the field, causing riots and eventual civil unrest. The rioting resulted in 73 deaths and at least 1,000 injured, making it the worst disaster in the history of soccer in that nation.
- 10 February – A riot erupted after a boxing fight between Luis Lazarte and Johnriel Casimero was stopped in round ten and Casimero credited with a tenth-round technical knockout win in Mar del Plata, Argentina. Lazarte had been cited for illegal blows, and at one point in the fight had threatened referee Eddie Claudio. After Claudio stopped the bout, fans at ringside began throwing debris, chairs and bottles, and drunk fans climbed into the ring. Casimero was assaulted, while one of his corner men, Sean Gibbons, was hit in the head and suffered a broken rib, several fans and security personnel were injured after being hit by chairs, while Claudio was hit in the mouth by a beer bottle and required stitches. The International Boxing Federation handed Lazarte a lifetime ban for his conduct.
- 19 October – During a Football League Championship match between Sheffield Wednesday and Leeds United at Hillsborough, Leeds supporter Aaron Cawley invaded the pitch and shoved Wednesday goalkeeper Chris Kirkland in the face before returning to the stands; Cawley was soon apprehended, and stated to police he was so drunk he could not remember his actions. He pleaded guilty to assault and was sentenced to 16 weeks in jail and banned from attending football matches for six years.

=== 2013 ===
- 13 April – In Major League Soccer, FC Dallas defender George John was struck in the head by a bottle thrown by a fan of his own club immediately after scoring the winning goal in a home match against the Los Angeles Galaxy.
- 11 June – In a 2014 FIFA World Cup qualification – CONCACAF fourth round match at Estadio Azteca in Mexico City between Costa Rica and Mexico, Costa Rican captain Bryan Ruiz was hit by debris thrown from the stands when attempting to take a corner kick in the 78th minute. Ruiz dropped to the ground in pain and Mexico fans accused him of a unique form of diving in an effort to intentionally stall having to take the corner kick and run down the clock to preserve the 0–0 tie; after Ruiz fell to the ground, they proceeded to throw more debris on the field until security personnel arrived. The 0–0 tie stood as the final score.
- 18 June – Before an AFC qualifying match between South Korea and Iran in Seoul, the last game of the group for both teams, South Korean coach Choi Kang-Hee pledged that he would "defeat Iran no matter what. Coach Queiroz will be watching the Brazil World Cup on TV." and statements of feud and revenge started to come from the South Korea national football team stating that they would "make life painful" and make the captain of Iran cry "tears of blood". Iran eventually won 1–0. As Iran started to celebrate on the pitch, South Korean fans started throwing water bottles at the Iranian players. As Carlos Queiroz made his way across the pitch to thank the Iranian fans, he was also pelted by the South Korean fans. After the match, the coach of the South Korean team resigned.
- 30 June – During a soccer match in Maranhão, referee Otavio Jordao da Silva ejected Josemir Santos Abreu from the match. This led to a confrontation which ended in da Silva pulling a knife and stabbing Abreu, who would later die from his injuries. Fans rushed the field where they tied up da Silva and ruthlessly beat him and stoned him to death. He was then quartered and decapitated using a sickle and his severed head was placed on a spike on the field. One fan was arrested in relation to the murder.
- 14 July – In a Nabire Regency Boxing Championship, 3,200 kilometers from Jakarta, the capital city of Indonesia, a riot occurred related after the home city boxer's loss when his fans threw chairs at the judges; the winner's fans responded by throwing objects, causing a wild brawl and mass panic in the stadium. About 1,500 spectators scrambled out from the two working exits, causing a stampede leaving 18 fans dead and 40 injured.

=== 2014 ===
- 1 May – At a baseball game in South Korea, an umpire was attacked by a 30-year-old fan from the stands who was upset over a call at first base. The incident occurred during the 7th inning between the Kia Tigers and SK Wyverns at Gwangju-Kia Champions Field, where the Tigers play their home games. Park Keun-young made a safe call at first base on a double play attempt in the 6th inning, in which the runner may have been out, before the fan ran onto the field and attacked Park. The Tigers won the game 6–3.
- 23 August – Albert Ebossé Bodjongo of JS Kabylie, was struck in the head by an object thrown from the stands at the end of a soccer match in a 2–1 loss to USM Alger in Algeria. Bodjongo was taken to a hospital, but he later died from a traumatic brain injury.
- 14 October – During the UEFA Euro 2016 qualifying Group I match between the national football teams of Serbia and Albania at Partizan Stadium in Belgrade, Serbia, a small remote-controlled quadcopter drone with a politically charged pro-Albanian banner suspended from it hovered over the stadium. Serbian defender Stefan Mitrović pulled the flag down, causing several Albanian players to set upon him in order to retrieve the banner. Albanian player Bekim Balaj eventually took the banner before being attacked by a Serbian fan, who ran onto the pitch wielding a plastic stool, which lead to a large brawl involving players, staff and Serbian spectators. Referee Martin Atkinson eventually lead the Albanian team off the pitch to the player tunnel, where more fans tried to attack them and threw numerous objects at them. After a 30-minute delay, the game was suspended at 0–0 in the 41st minute.
- 3 November – During the Tel Aviv derby, Eran Zahavi scored a penalty to equalise the score at 1–1 in the first half, but was then attacked by a pitch invader. On retaliating, he was sent off, prompting more pitch invasions which led to the match being abandoned.

=== 2015 ===
- 7 February – During an Indiana high school boys basketball game between Hammond and Griffith high schools, Griffith's Anthony Murphy was attempting a slam dunk when Tim Echoles of Hammond fouled him into a padded wall: players, coaches, fans and Griffith police spilled onto the court to engage in a brawl that lasted several minutes. The game was called on the spot, and both schools had the remainder of their seasons cancelled by the Indiana High School Athletic Association.
- 10 August – During a first round match of the DFB-Pokal between VfL Osnabrück and RB Leipzig, referee Martin Petersen was struck in the back of the head by a lighter, thrown by an Osnabrück supporter. The match was abandoned, and later the win was awarded to Leipzig. Osnabrück were leading 1–0 in the 71st minute at the time of the event.

=== 2016 ===
- 2 March – During a semifinal match in the 2015–16 Greek Football Cup, PAOK midfielder Robert Mak was taken down in the penalty area, and after there was no call on the play late in the second half with Olympiacos leading 2–1, crowds in the stands were outraged and flares were thrown onto the field in the 89th minute. Players and officials were escorted off the field by security and riot police, and the first leg of the two-game aggregate would be suspended.
- 21 May – On the final whistle of the 2016 Scottish Cup Final at Hampden Park, several hundred supporters of winners Hibernian (who had won the trophy for the first time in 114 years) invaded the pitch to celebrate; some also approached the opposite end to goad fans of the losing finalists Rangers, leading to them also running onto the pitch where multiple fights broke out and continued for some minutes. Mounted police were brought in to restore order, the trophy was presented an hour later and a police investigation to identify those involved in the violence lasted several months.

=== 2017 ===
- On 10 December 2017, after a game between the Seattle Seahawks and Jacksonville Jaguars at Everbank Field in Jacksonville, Florida, several Jaguar fans threw drinks and debris at Seahawks player Quinton Jefferson. Jefferson had to be restrained from entering the stands.

=== 2019 ===
- During an EFL Championship match between city rivals Birmingham City and Aston Villa at St Andrew's, Birmingham City supporter Paul Mitchell ran onto the pitch and punched Villa midfielder Jack Grealish in the back of the head. Grealish went on to score the game's only goal, giving Villa a 1–0 win. Mitchell was later given a 14-week prison sentence, a 10-year ban from attending football matches in the United Kingdom, and a £350 fine. Mitchell served four weeks of his sentence before being released, calling his time in custody "the best month of my life" and refusing to apologize for the attack. Later, Mitchell served an additional six-week sentence for breaking his football ban. In 2023, Mitchell died at the age of 32 of drug and alcohol toxicity. As of 2025, this match remains the most recent meeting between the two sides.

=== 2021 ===
- 16 October – Tennessee fans threw debris including hot dogs and a bottle of mustard at the end of their game against Ole Miss. Rebels head coach Lane Kiffin got hit with a golfball while speaking with an official. The SEC fined Tennessee $250,000 for the 20-minute delay.

=== 2022 ===
- 5 March – The 62nd minute of a soccer match between Querétaro and Atlas from Guadalajara, with Atlas leading 1–0, was suspended after multiple fights broke out in the stands. Some spectators used chairs and metal bars as weapons, even one on the field with a knife to cut the nets of a goalkeeper net. Most of the players retreated off the field quickly and into their respective locker rooms before spectators ran onto the field to look for a place of safety. There were 26 people who were seriously injured (3 critically injured) in the riots. Liga MX, a professional soccer league in Mexico, suspended all matches scheduled the next day. State authorities have suspended 5 officials for this incident.
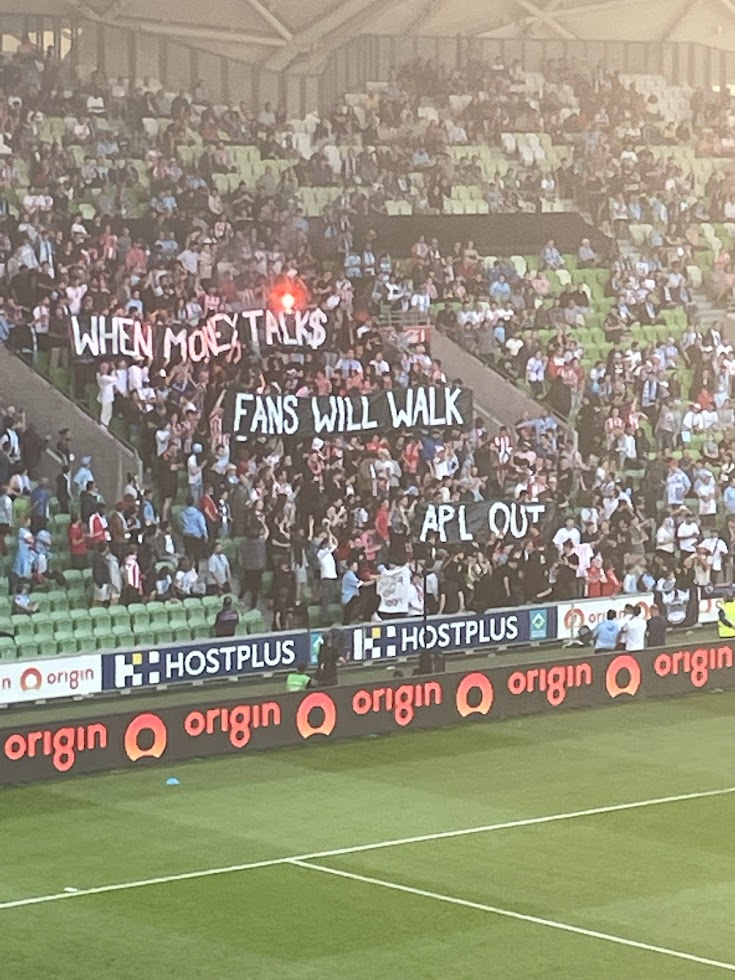
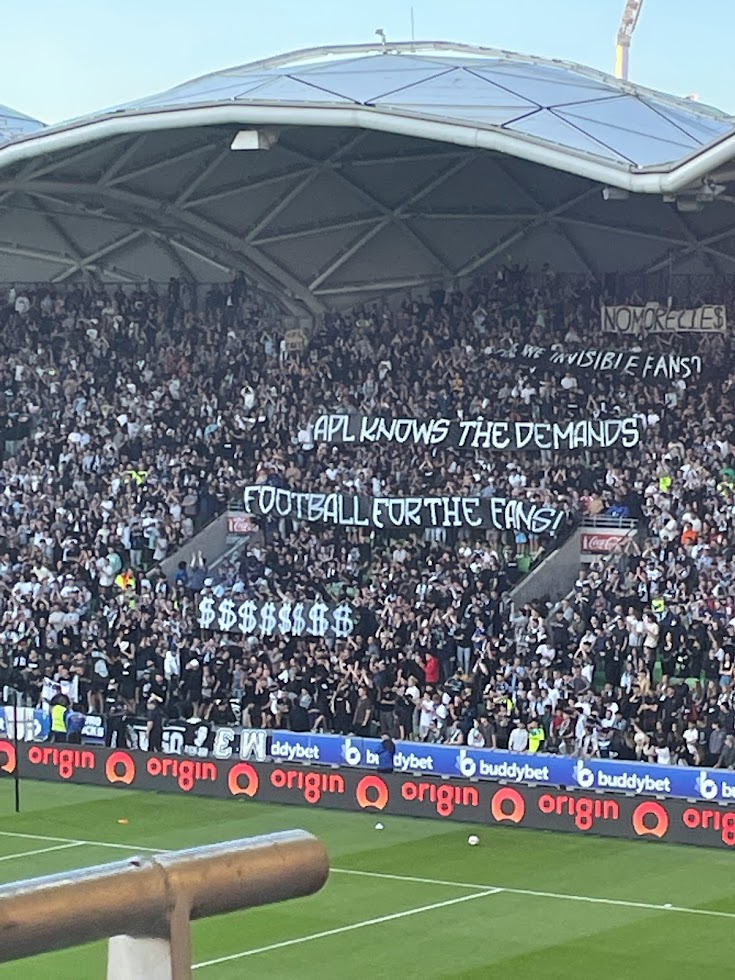
  Melbourne City and Melbourne Victory active support groups protesting the Grand Final decision before Victory supporters stormed the pitch in the 20th minute.
- 17 December – A pre-organised fan 'walk-out' was planned to take place in the 20th minute during a Melbourne Derby between Melbourne Victory and Melbourne City. The walk-out was planned to take place as a protest after the Australian Professional Leagues announced an agreement with Destination NSW that would see the 2023, 2024, and 2025 A-League Men Grand Finals hosted in Sydney, as opposed to the traditional format of being hosted by the finalist that finished higher during the regular season. In the 20th minute a flare was thrown at Melbourne City goalkeeper Tom Glover; Glover then threw the flare back into the crowd of Melbourne Victory fans. This sparked a pitch invasion by between 100 and 200 spectators, during which a metal bucket of sand, which had been used by match officials in order to extinguish ignited flares, was thrown by a pitch invader at Glover, which resulted in Glover sustaining a concussion and a cut to the face.

=== 2023 ===
- 2 February – Multiple fights and brawls between spectators halted an Indiana boys basketball game featuring Washington High School and James Whitcomb Riley High School: the game was resumed at a later date.
- 8 February – A brawl in Washington County High School started between Riverside-Martin High School basketball players and a Washington County deputy. Several Riverside players punched the deputy and knocked him out on the floor, while spectators were also involved before the game was eventually called off. Riverside High School's junior varsity season ended early as punishment for the brawl.
- 19 September – Twenty-five people were charged, including eight adults, 14 students and three other juveniles, after a brawl took place during a high school football match between Monroe High School and Forest Hills High School. The game was called off in the third quarter as a result.

=== 2024 ===
- 19 February – a brawl broke out between the Texas A&M–Commerce Lions and the Incarnate Word Cardinals at the end of a basketball game. A young girl and a student manager were injured during the fight. Eight players, four from each team, were suspended.
- 10 March – a fight broke out between the LSU Tigers and South Carolina Gamecocks during the final round of the 2024 SEC women's basketball tournament. The fight began after South Carolina guard MiLaysia Fulwiley stole the ball from LSU's Flau'jae Johnson. While returning to the bench Johnson bumped into South Carolina's Ashlyn Watkins, and Watkins' teammate Kamilla Cardoso responded by shoving Johnson to the floor. Cardoso, three of her teammates, and two LSU players were ejected from the game, as was Johnson's brother who had jumped over the scorer's table onto the court.
- 2024 NCAA Division I FBS football season incidents:
  - 19 October – During the Texas vs. Georgia game, Texas fans threw debris on the field which caused a disruption in the game. While the debris was being cleaned up, the officials gathered and changed their original call on the field. Texas was fined $250,000 by the SEC for the disruption to the game. Georgia coach Kirby Smart said afterwards that by changing the call, referees set a "dangerous" precedent.
  - 26 October – Debris was thrown on the field by Ohio State fans in the Ohio State vs. Nebraska game after a targeting call went against the Buckeyes. While this did not result in a change in the officials' on-field call, the Big Ten Conference declined to impose any sanctions on Ohio State. Many news outlets linked this incident to the Texas incident above.
  - 2 November – Clemson fans threw debris on the field during their game against Louisville. This was reported to have been linked to the above two incidents, in that the fans thought they could change the officials' call by forcing the game to be interrupted momentarily.
  - 9 November – Texas Tech fans threw tortillas and other debris on the field during a game against Colorado. Texas Tech's coach pleaded with students to stop throwing things onto the field.
  - 9 November – In another incident linked to the Texas game above, LSU fans threw debris on the field after a face mask penalty against Alabama. Commentator Kirk Herbstreit criticized the trend of throwing things on the field, saying "You see it popping up in college football, that's enough, clowns. What are you doing? It's stupid."
  - 9 November – At Salt Lake City, after BYU kicked a last-second field goal to beat rival Utah, fans threw objects onto the field. This was in response to a controversial defensive holding call earlier on BYU's final drive. The BYU cheer coach was hit in the head with a water bottle and lost consciousness.

=== 2025 ===
- 7 March – At a Pennsylvania high school basketball playoff game between Unionville and Meadville, a brawl involving fans and players led to the game being called off. No winner was declared despite Meadville leading 63–55 late in the 4th quarter.
- 9 June — Late in Game 3 of the 2025 Stanley Cup Final in Sunrise, Florida, after Kasperi Kapanen of the Edmonton Oilers was ejected from the game, a female Florida Panthers hooligan dumped a drink on him, which led to an altercation.

=== 2026 ===
- 7 November – Ole Miss fans threw bottles and other debris onto the Vaught–Hemingway Stadium field after an interception was taken away due to a penalty for roughing the passer. The school was fined $250,000 for its fans' disrupting the game and endangering the contest's participants. The Georgia Bulldogs defeated the Rebels, 42–7.
