= Floyd Thomson =

Canadian ice hockey player

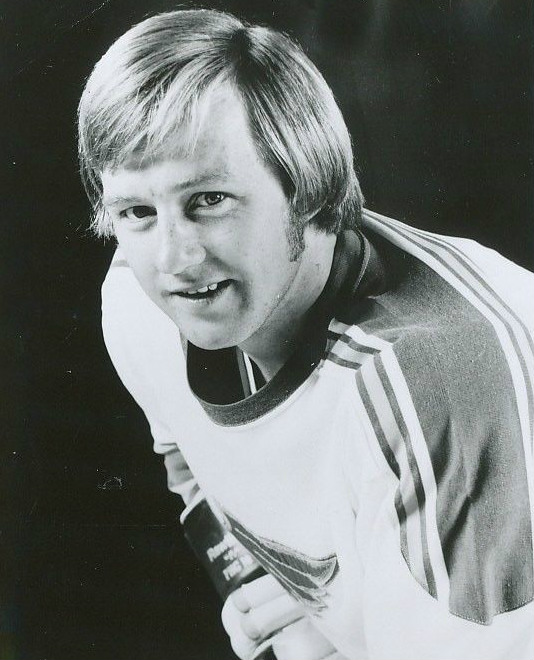
- Born: June 14, 1949 (age 76) Capreol, Ontario, Canada
- Height: 6 ft 0 in (183 cm)
- Weight: 190 lb (86 kg; 13 st 8 lb)
- Position: Left wing
- Shot: Left
- Played for: St. Louis Blues
- NHL draft: Undrafted
- Playing career: 1969–1982

Floyd Harvey Thomson (born June 14, 1949) is a Canadian former ice hockey player. He played with the St. Louis Blues of the National Hockey League (NHL) from 1971 to 1980. An undrafted player, Thomson began his professional career in 1969 in the International Hockey League with the Fort Wayne Komets before signing with the Blues as a free agent in 1970. He played 411 NHL games, all with St. Louis, scoring 56 goals and 97 assists. He spent the majority of his last five seasons in the Central Hockey League with the Salt Lake Golden Eagles where he was a Second and First Team All-Star in 1978 and 1979, respectively. Thomson retired in 1982.

== Early life ==
Thomson, who later earned the nickname White-Pine, was taught how to skate as a toddler by his mother and played his amateur hockey in the Northern Ontario Hockey Association with the Falonbridge-Garson organization. After spending the 1969–70 season with the IHL's Fort Wayne Komets, Thomson was invited to play summer hockey in Johannesburg, South Africa.

== Pre-NHL ==
Thomson spent the 1971–72 season in the Western Hockey League with the Denver Spurs, a team he captained to a championship, the first of three rings he'd win during his minor-pro career.

== National Hockey League ==
Was taken under the wing of veterans Gary Sabourin, Red Berenson and Garry Unger early in his career with the Blues and is described as a player to took pride at both ends of the ice.

He arrived in St. Louis in 1971–72, scoring four goals and 10 points in 49 games. Thomson spent the next five seasons with the Blues scoring a career-high 14 goals in 1972-73.

The Blues made the NHL playoffs in three of his six full seasons with the team and he played in 10 playoff games, collecting two assists.

== Post National Hockey League ==
In 1977–78 Thomson was sent down to the CHL's Salt Lake City Golden Eagles, where he was named a second-team all star. The following season he scored 41 goals and 81 points.

Thomson spent most of the 1979–80 season with the Golden Eagles, returning to the Blues for the final 11 games of his NHL career. His Salt Lake City team won the Adams Cup that season and captured a second straight title in 1980–81, Thomson's last season in professional hockey.

== Career statistics ==
=== Regular season and playoffs ===
			Regular season					Playoffs
Season	Team	League	GP	G	A	Pts	PIM	GP	G	A	Pts	PIM
1965–66	Garson-Falconbridge Native Sons	NOJHL	1	1	0	1	0	—	—	—	—	—
1966–67	Garson-Falconbridge Native Sons	NOJHL	40	20	19	39	10	7	2	3	5	6
1967–68	Garson-Falconbridge Combines	NOJHL	29	5	12	17	56	7	3	4	7	21
1968–69	Garson-Falconbridge Combines	NOJHL	42	16	12	28	74	6	6	5	11	12
1969–70	Fort Wayne Komets	IHL	69	10	19	29	81	3	0	1	1	0
1970–71	Kansas City Blues	CHL	72	15	18	33	73	—	—	—	—	—
1971–72	Kansas City Blues	CHL	6	1	5	6	0	—	—	—	—	—
1971–72	St. Louis Blues	NHL	49	4	6	10	48	—	—	—	—	—
1971–72	Denver Spurs	WHL	17	6	6	12	8	9	2	2	4	14
1972–73	St. Louis Blues	NHL	75	14	20	34	71	5	0	1	1	2
1973–74	St. Louis Blues	NHL	77	11	22	33	58	—	—	—	—	—
1974–75	St. Louis Blues	NHL	77	9	27	36	106	2	0	1	1	0
1975–76	St. Louis Blues	NHL	58	8	10	18	25	—	—	—	—	—
1976–77	St. Louis Blues	NHL	58	7	8	15	11	3	0	0	0	4
1976–77	Kansas City Blues	CHL	13	3	11	14	16	—	—	—	—	—
1977–78	St. Louis Blues	NHL	6	1	1	2	4	—	—	—	—	—
1977–78	Salt Lake City Golden Eagles	CHL	69	26	26	52	45	6	2	1	3	2
1978–79	Salt Lake City Golden Eagles	CHL	76	41	40	81	96	10	5	4	9	11
1979–80	St. Louis Blues	NHL	11	2	3	5	18	—	—	—	—	—
1979–80	Salt Lake City Golden Eagles	CHL	73	23	41	64	49	13	6	8	14	11
1980–81	Salt Lake City Golden Eagles	CHL	76	24	33	57	104	17	3	4	7	0
1981–82	Salt Lake City Golden Eagles	CHL	74	17	28	45	83	9	1	0	1	4
NHL totals			411	56	97	153	341	10	0	2	2	6
