= Gary Sabourin =

Canadian ice hockey player

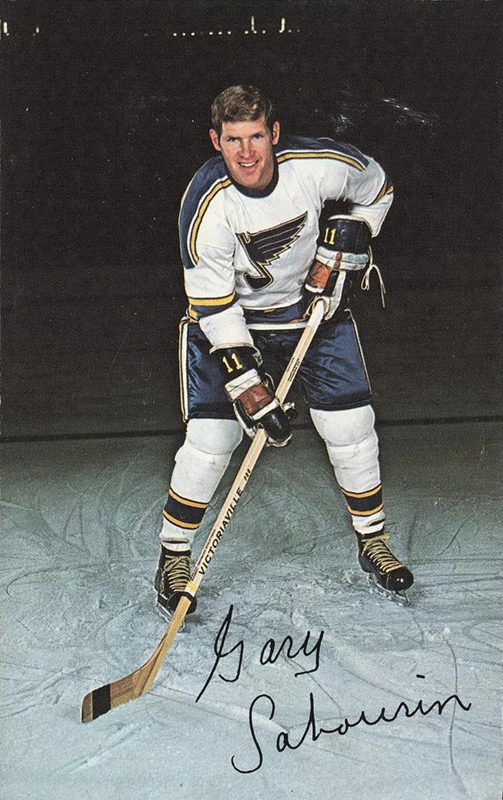
- Sabourin in 1970 photo
- Born: December 4, 1943 (age 82) Parry Sound, Ontario, Canada
- Height: 5 ft 11 in (180 cm)
- Weight: 180 lb (82 kg; 12 st 12 lb)
- Position: Right wing
- Shot: Left
- Played for: St. Louis Blues; Toronto Maple Leafs; California Golden Seals; Cleveland Barons
- Playing career: 1967–1977

Gary Bruce Sabourin (born December 4, 1943) is a Canadian former professional ice hockey right winger who played ten seasons in the National Hockey League from 1967–68 until 1976–77.

== Career ==
Sabourin played in the NHL All-Star Game in 1970 and 1971. He played 627 career NHL games, the first seven seasons with the St. Louis Blues, scoring 169 goals and 188 assists for 357 points. Sabourin also played 62 playoff games, scoring 19 goals and 11 assists for 30 points.

== Career statistics ==
=== Regular season and playoffs ===
			Regular season					Playoffs
Season	Team	League	GP	G	A	Pts	PIM	GP	G	A	Pts	PIM
1962–63	Guelph Royals	OHA	42	14	26	40	119	—	—	—	—	—
1963–64	Kitchener Rangers	OHA	53	16	34	50	111	—	—	—	—	—
1963–64	St. Paul Rangers	CPHL	6	2	1	3	9	2	0	0	0	0
1964–65	St. Paul Rangers	CPHL	59	16	22	38	92	11	0	7	7	16
1965–66	Minnesota Rangers	CPHL	66	11	30	41	118	7	3	1	4	16
1966–67	Omaha Knights	CPHL	70	23	25	48	121	12	2	2	4	12
1967–68	St. Louis Blues	NHL	50	13	10	23	50	18	4	2	6	30
1967–68	Kansas City Blues	CPHL	18	8	10	18	16	—	—	—	—	—
1968–69	St. Louis Blues	NHL	75	25	23	48	58	12	6	5	11	12
1969–70	St. Louis Blues	NHL	72	28	14	42	61	16	5	0	5	10
1970–71	St. Louis Blues	NHL	59	14	17	31	56	—	—	—	—	—
1971–72	St. Louis Blues	NHL	77	28	17	45	52	11	3	3	6	6
1972–73	St. Louis Blues	NHL	76	21	27	48	30	5	1	1	2	0
1973–74	St. Louis Blues	NHL	54	7	23	30	27	—	—	—	—	—
1974–75	Toronto Maple Leafs	NHL	55	5	18	23	26	—	—	—	—	—
1975–76	California Golden Seals	NHL	76	21	28	49	33	—	—	—	—	—
1976–77	Cleveland Barons	NHL	33	7	11	18	4	—	—	—	—	—
NHL totals			627	169	188	357	397	62	19	11	30	58
