= GAG line =

1960s and 1970s New York Rangers line

The GAG line, which as an acronym for Goal-A-Game, was a famous ice hockey line for the New York Rangers in the late 1960s and early 1970s, as these linemates averaged over 1 goal a game while playing together. It consisted of Jean Ratelle at center, Rod Gilbert on right wing and Vic Hadfield (also the Rangers team captain) on the left side.

== 1972 ==
In the 1971–72 NHL season, Ratelle, Hadfield, and Gilbert finished third, fourth, and fifth in league scoring, respectively. Ratelle had been leading the Boston Bruins' Phil Esposito in the scoring race, until Ratelle broke his ankle and was sidelined for a month. In the playoffs, they defeated the defending champions Montreal Canadiens, and last year's finalists Chicago Blackhawks, to reach the Stanley Cup Final where they lost to the Boston Bruins.

The trio also started the Summit Series, but Hadfield failed to register a point in his 2 games, and he walked out on Team Canada when the series shifted to Moscow. Three other Canadian players also left the team as well, and the Canadian press at the time considered them "deserters". Hadfield blamed series promoter Alan Eagleson for not holding a press conference to come to their defense. Otherwise, there was no lasting animosity about the decision to leave, as Hadfield and the others had the full support and respect of the coaches and teammates, and the four are welcomed members at alumni events. Hadfield's LW position was filled by Dennis Hull of the Chicago Blackhawks.

== Breakup ==
The line was broken up in 1974 when Vic Hadfield was traded to the Pittsburgh Penguins for Nick Beverley.

The following season Jean Ratelle was traded along with defenseman Brad Park and Joe Zanussi to the Boston Bruins in exchange for Carol Vadnais and Phil Esposito. At the time, this was considered the biggest blockbuster trade in NHL history.

Ratelle finished his career as a Bruin, winning his second Lady Byng Trophy and reaching the Stanley Cup Final in 1977 and 1978.

Gilbert remained with the Rangers for the rest of his career. Throughout his career, he had been wearing the number '7', but so had Phil Esposito. As a result, a bitter disagreement ensued as to who would retain the number '7'. Gilbert's number '7' was subsequently retired by the Rangers.

Hadfield finished his career with the Penguins where he had two more 30 goal seasons.

On February 25, 2018, Ratelle's number '19' was retired by the Rangers. During the ceremony, Ratelle and Gilbert announced that Hadfield's '11' would be retired during the 2018-19 NHL season.

== See also ==
- List of ice hockey line nicknames
- Jean Ratelle interview with HHOF
