= Sheldon A. Ilowite =

American novelist

Sheldon A. Ilowite (February 19, 1931 – March 13, 2022) was an American author of juvenile novels about ice hockey. He was a former ice hockey coach.

Ilowite was born in New York to Arthur Ilowite and Mae Terdeman. His father and his maternal grandparents were Romanian immigrants.

== Bibliography ==
- Fury on Ice
- Hockey Defenceman
- Centerman From Quebec
- Penalty Killer
- On the Wing: Rod Gilbert, a biography of Rod Gilbert
