= Dale Rolfe =

Canadian ice hockey player

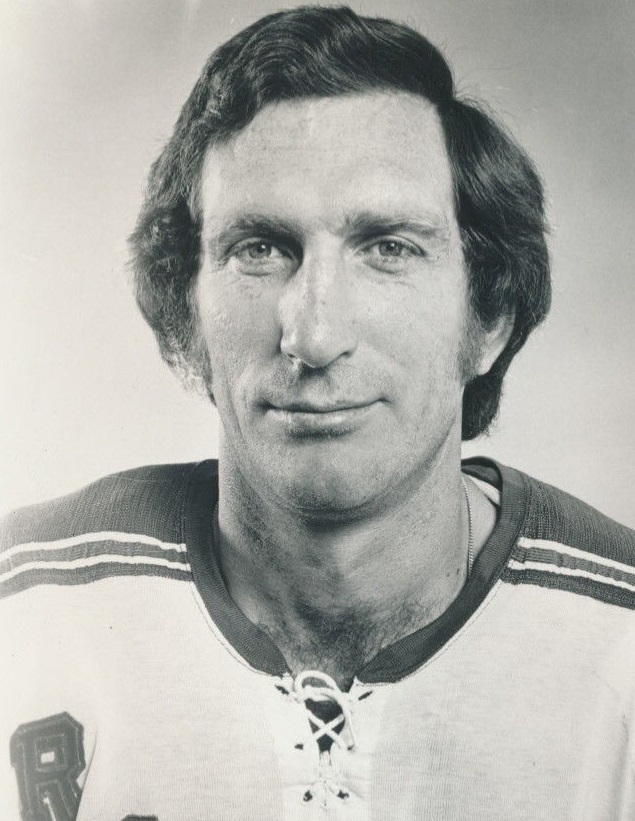
- Rolfe in 1971
- Born: April 30, 1940 (age 86) Timmins, Ontario, Canada
- Height: 6 ft 4 in (193 cm)
- Weight: 195 lb (88 kg; 13 st 13 lb)
- Position: Defence
- Shot: Left
- Played for: Boston Bruins; Los Angeles Kings; Detroit Red Wings; New York Rangers
- Playing career: 1956–1975

Dale Roland Carl Rolfe (born April 30, 1940) is a Canadian former ice hockey defenceman. He played for four teams in the National Hockey League (NHL) between 1960 and 1975. He spent his junior career with the Barrie Flyers through the 1956–57 and 1959–60 seasons. During the 1959–60 NHL season, Rolfe played three games with the Boston Bruins as well as two games with the Kingston Frontenacs of the EPHL.

== Professional career ==
Rolfe then spent the 1960–61 and 1961–62 seasons with the Portland Buckaroos of the Western Hockey League. Rolfe then moved to the American Hockey League where he spent the next season with the Hershey Bears and the following four seasons with the Springfield Indians. In the 1967–68 season, he returned to the National Hockey League, playing for the Los Angeles Kings. He played for the Kings until he was traded to the Detroit Red Wings on February 20, 1970. Rolfe stayed with Detroit for the remainder of the 1969–70 season and the majority of the 1970–71 season before being traded to the New York Rangers for Jim Krulicki where he would spend the rest of his professional career, retiring after the 1974–75 NHL season.

Rolfe was noted for being at the wrong end of a lopsided fight with Dave Schultz in a 4–3 defeat to the Philadelphia Flyers in the decisive Game 7 of the Stanley Cup Semifinals at The Spectrum on May 5, 1974. Dispelling any perception that his Rangers teammates were intimidated because they stood by and did nothing, Brad Park sent an email to the New York Post in 2011 stating that the NHL "had brought the third-man-in rule, so someone would have gotten thrown out of the game with a game misconduct for intervening" and that Rolfe "looked me in the eye and said to stay out of it" for that exact reason when Park tried to step in.

Rolfe's career as an active player ended as a result of a left ankle fracture when the blade of his skate caught a rut on Madison Square Garden ice in the second period of an 8–6 Rangers loss to the Pittsburgh Penguins on March 2, 1975. His left talus was pulled completely out of the ankle joint with the broken bones cutting through his hockey sock. Team orthopedist Dr. James Nicholas informed him that "there is a real and dangerous risk of reinjury" and advised him to stop playing hockey.

Rolfe played a total of 509 NHL regular season games with 25 goals, 125 assists, and 556 penalty minutes.

He was known to as a defender who used reach and strength to play the puck or take a man out of the play.

== Career statistics ==
=== Regular season and playoffs ===
| | | | Regular season | | | | | Playoffs |
| Season | Team | League | GP | G | A | Pts | PIM | GP | G | A | Pts | PIM |
|---|---|---|---|---|---|---|---|---|---|---|---|---|
| 1956–57 | Barrie Flyers | OHA | 52 | 18 | 16 | 34 | 37 | 3 | 0 | 0 | 0 | 2 |
| 1957–58 | Barrie Flyers | OHA | 50 | 5 | 22 | 27 | 83 | 4 | 0 | 0 | 0 | 8 |
| 1958–59 | Barrie Flyers | OHA | 44 | 9 | 25 | 34 | 132 | 6 | 1 | 4 | 5 | 24 |
| 1959–60 | Barrie Flyers | OHA | 48 | 8 | 39 | 47 | 127 | 6 | 1 | 6 | 7 | 25 |
| 1959–60 | Boston Bruins | NHL | 3 | 0 | 0 | 0 | 0 | — | — | — | — | — |
| 1959–60 | Kingston Frontenacs | EPHL | 2 | 0 | 1 | 1 | 2 | — | — | — | — | — |
| 1960–61 | Portland Buckaroos | WHL | 70 | 4 | 12 | 16 | 52 | 14 | 2 | 5 | 7 | 8 |
| 1961–62 | Portland Buckaroos | WHL | 70 | 7 | 15 | 22 | 65 | 7 | 1 | 2 | 3 | 8 |
| 1962–63 | Hershey Bears | AHL | 53 | 3 | 9 | 12 | 78 | 11 | 1 | 3 | 4 | 26 |
| 1963–64 | Springfield Indians | AHL | 71 | 2 | 16 | 18 | 103 | — | — | — | — | — |
| 1964–65 | Springfield Indians | AHL | 69 | 10 | 25 | 35 | 68 | — | — | — | — | — |
| 1965–66 | Springfield Indians | AHL | 71 | 5 | 27 | 32 | 94 | 6 | 0 | 1 | 1 | 16 |
| 1966–67 | Springfield Indians | AHL | 67 | 14 | 35 | 49 | 94 | — | — | — | — | — |
| 1967–68 | Los Angeles Kings | NHL | 68 | 3 | 13 | 16 | 84 | 7 | 0 | 1 | 1 | 14 |
| 1967–68 | Springfield Indians | AHL | 6 | 1 | 5 | 6 | 2 | — | — | — | — | — |
| 1968–69 | Los Angeles Kings | NHL | 75 | 3 | 19 | 22 | 85 | 10 | 0 | 4 | 4 | 8 |
| 1969–70 | Los Angeles Kings | NHL | 55 | 1 | 9 | 10 | 77 | — | — | — | — | — |
| 1969–70 | Detroit Red Wings | NHL | 20 | 2 | 9 | 11 | 12 | 4 | 0 | 2 | 2 | 8 |
| 1970–71 | Detroit Red Wings | NHL | 44 | 3 | 9 | 12 | 48 | — | — | — | — | — |
| 1970–71 | New York Rangers | NHL | 14 | 0 | 7 | 7 | 23 | 13 | 0 | 1 | 1 | 14 |
| 1971–72 | New York Rangers | NHL | 68 | 2 | 14 | 16 | 67 | 16 | 4 | 3 | 7 | 16 |
| 1972–73 | New York Rangers | NHL | 72 | 7 | 25 | 32 | 74 | 8 | 0 | 5 | 5 | 6 |
| 1973–74 | New York Rangers | NHL | 48 | 3 | 12 | 15 | 56 | 13 | 1 | 8 | 9 | 23 |
| 1974–75 | New York Rangers | NHL | 42 | 1 | 8 | 9 | 30 | — | — | — | — | — |
| NHL totals | | | 509 | 25 | 125 | 150 | 556 | 71 | 5 | 24 | 29 | 89 |
