= Jim Krulicki =

Canadian ice hockey player

- Born: March 9, 1948 (age 78) Kitchener, Ontario, Canada
- Height: 5 ft 11 in (180 cm)
- Weight: 180 lb (82 kg; 12 st 12 lb)
- Position: Right wing
- Shot: Left
- Played for: Detroit Red Wings; New York Rangers; Wiener EV
- Playing career: 1967–1973

James John Krulicki (born March 9, 1948) is a Canadian retired ice hockey right winger. He played 41 games in the National Hockey League for the New York Rangers and the Detroit Red Wings during the 1970–71 season.

== Professional career ==
=== Minor league hockey ===
Krulicki grew up playing for his hometown Kitchener Greenshirts and Kitchener Rangers of the Ontario Hockey Association, while a prospect of the New York Rangers. Krulicki recorded back-to-back 20 goal seasons in 1966–67 and 1967–68, scoring 25 and 28 goals respectively, for a total of 108 points over those two seasons. In 1968 he turned professional with the Omaha Knights of the Central Hockey League. In his first season with the Knights he scored nine points, but followed that up in 1969–70 with a 28 point campaign. He helped the Knights reach first place in the regular season and win the Adams Cup as league champions of the playoffs. After scoring 12 points in the 12 game playoff run, Krulicki was called up to the Buffalo Bisons of the American Hockey League for their playoff run. He scored another five points as the Bisons reached the finals and won the Calder Cup after defeating the Springfield Kings four games to zero. Krulicki had just helped win championships for two different teams and had finally earned his chance at the NHL.

=== NHL career ===
Krulicki started the 1970–71 season with the New York Rangers. He recorded 2 assists in 27 games for the Rangers before being traded to the Detroit Red Wings on March 2, 1971, for Dale Rolfe. Krulicki finished the season with Detroit scoring one assist. He opted to retire at the conclusion of the 1970–71 season. He came back to play one final season with Wiener EV in the Austrian Hockey League during the 1972–73 season.

== Career statistics ==
=== Regular season and playoffs ===
			Regular season					Playoffs
Season	Team	League	GP	G	A	Pts	PIM	GP	G	A	Pts	PIM
1964–65	Kitchener Rangers	OHA	2	0	0	0	0	—	—	—	—	—
1964–65	Kitchener Greenshirts	COJHL	—	—	—	—	—	—	—	—	—	—
1965–66	Kitchener Rangers	OHA	48	16	8	24	41	19	4	4	8	4
1966–67	Kitchener Rangers	OHA	48	25	24	49	50	13	10	3	13	19
1966–67	Omaha Knights	CHL	—	—	—	—	—	3	0	0	0	0
1967–68	Kitchener Rangers	OHA	51	28	31	59	49	19	3	13	16	32
1968–69	Omaha Knights	CHL	32	3	6	9	10	—	—	—	—	—
1969–70	Omaha Knights	CHL	72	9	19	28	26	12	5	7	12	22
1969–70	Buffalo Bisons	AHL	—	—	—	—	—	7	3	2	5	5
1970–71	New York Rangers	NHL	27	0	2	2	6	—	—	—	—	—
1970–71	Omaha Knights	CHL	9	2	4	6	7	—	—	—	—	—
1970–71	Detroit Red Wings	NHL	14	0	1	1	0	—	—	—	—	—
1972–73	Wiener EV	AUT	28	15	5	20	33	—	—	—	—	—
CHL totals			113	14	29	43	43	12	5	7	12	22
NHL totals			41	0	3	3	6	—	—	—	—	—

== Awards ==
- Adams Cup Champion: 1969–70 (Omaha Knights – CHL)
- Calder Cup Champion: 1969–70 (Buffalo Bisons – AHL)
