= 25th National Hockey League All-Star Game =

Professional ice hockey exhibition game

25th NHL All-Star Game
	1	2	3	Total
East	0	2	1	3
West	1	1	0	2
- Date: January 25, 1972
- Arena: Metropolitan Sports Center
- City: Bloomington
- MVP: Bobby Orr (Boston)
- Attendance: 15,423

The 25th National Hockey League All-Star Game was held in the Metropolitan Sports Center in Bloomington, home of the Minnesota North Stars, on January 25, 1972. It was the first and only time the All-Star Game was held at the Metropolitan Sports Center. The East Division All-Stars defeated the West Division All-Stars 3–2. Bobby Orr was named the game's most valuable player.

== League business ==
Clarence Campbell, president of the NHL announced that the NHL was expanding to Atlanta and Long Island. Campbell also indicated that the NHL would expand by two further teams for the 1974–75 season. The executives of the Central Hockey League and the Western Hockey League met to discuss the merger of their two leagues. The merger discussions were disrupted when Daniel Myers, owner of the Salt Lake Golden Eagles, committed suicide.

== The game ==
It was the first time since 1956 that Gordie Howe did not play in the All-Star Game.

=== Summary ===
#	Score	Team	Goalscorer (Assist(s))	Time
First period
		East	Goaltender in: Dryden	0:00
		West	Goaltender in: T. Esposito	0:00
	0–0	East	Penalty: Hadfield	6:22
1	1-0	West	Goal: B. Hull (P. Martin, Maki)	17:01
Second period
2	2-0	West	Goal: Nolet (D. Hull)	1:11
3	2-1	East	Goal: Ratelle (Tremblay, Gilbert)	3:48
	2–1	West	Penalty: White	5:26
	2–1	East	Goaltender out: Dryden; Goaltender in: Villemure	10:24
	2–1	West	Goaltender out: T. Esposito; Goaltender in: Worsley	10:24
4	2 -2	East	Goal: McKenzie (Park, Seiling)	18:45
Third period
	2–2	West	Penalty: White	2:28
	2–2	East	Penalty: Esposito	5:34
	2–2	East	Penalty: Tremblay	8:42
	2–2	West	Penalty: Mohns	19:05
5	2-3	East	Goal: Esposito (Smith, Orr) (PPG)	19:16
Goaltenders
East: Dryden (30:24 minutes), Villemure (29:36 minutes).; West: T. Esposito (30:24 minutes), Worsley (29:36 minutes).
Shots on goal
East (30) 09 - 08 - 13; West (27) 10 - 11 - 06
Officials
Referee : Bruce Hood Linesmen : Claude Bechard, Matt Pavelich

Source: Podnieks

== Team Lineups ==
=== East Division All-Stars ===
- Coach: Al MacNeil (Montreal Canadiens)

#	Nat.	Player	Pos.	Team
Goaltenders
1	(Canada)	Ken Dryden		Montreal Canadiens
30	(Canada)	Gilles Villemure		New York Rangers
Defencemen
2	(Canada)	Brad Park		New York Rangers
3	(Canada)	J. C. Tremblay		Montreal Canadiens
4	(Canada)	Bobby Orr		Boston Bruins
9	(Canada)	Dale Tallon		Vancouver Canucks
16	(Canada)	Rod Seiling		New York Rangers
20	(Canada)	Dallas Smith		Boston Bruins
Forwards
5	(Canada)	Red Berenson	C	Detroit Red Wings
6	(Canada)	Rick Martin	LW	Buffalo Sabres
7	(Canada)	Phil Esposito	C	Boston Bruins
8	(Canada)	Rod Gilbert	RW	New York Rangers
10	(Canada)	Gilbert Perreault	C	Buffalo Sabres
11	(Canada)	Vic Hadfield	LW	New York Rangers
12	(Canada)	Yvan Cournoyer	RW	Montreal Canadiens
17	(Canada)	Paul Henderson	LW	Toronto Maple Leafs
18	(Canada)	John McKenzie	RW	Boston Bruins
19	(Canada)	Jean Ratelle	C	New York Rangers
27	(Canada)	Frank Mahovlich	LW	Montreal Canadiens

=== West Division All-Stars ===
- Coach: Billy Reay (Chicago Black Hawks)

#	Nat.	Player	Pos.	Team
Goaltenders
1	(Canada)	Gump Worsley		Minnesota North Stars
35	(Canada)	Tony Esposito		Chicago Black Hawks
Defencemen
2	(Canada)	Bill White		Chicago Black Hawks
3	(Canada)	Keith Magnuson		Chicago Black Hawks
4	(Canada)	Ted Harris		Minnesota North Stars
5	(Canada)	Carol Vadnais		California Golden Seals
6	(Canada)	Doug Mohns		Minnesota North Stars
12	(Canada)	Pat Stapleton		Chicago Black Hawks
Forwards
7	(Canada)	Garry Unger	RW	St. Louis Blues
8	(Canada)	Bill Goldsworthy	RW	Minnesota North Stars
9	(Canada)	Bobby Hull	LW	Chicago Black Hawks
10	(Canada)	Dennis Hull	LW	Chicago Black Hawks
11	(Canada)	Ross Lonsberry	LW	Los Angeles Kings
14	(Canada)	Pit Martin	C	Chicago Black Hawks
15	(Canada)	Bobby Clarke	C	Philadelphia Flyers
16	(Canada)	Chico Maki	RW	Chicago Black Hawks
17	(Canada)	Simon Nolet	RW	Philadelphia Flyers
21	(Canada)	Stan Mikita	C	Chicago Black Hawks
22	(Canada)	Greg Polis	LW	Pittsburgh Penguins

G = Goaltenders; D = Defencemen; C = Center; LW/RW = Left Wing/Right Wing

Source: Podnieks

== See also ==
- 1971–72 NHL season
