= Jacques Caron =

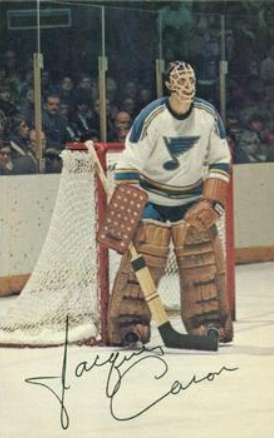
- Caron in 1971 card
- Born: April 21, 1940 (age 86) Noranda, Quebec, Canada
- Height: 6 ft 2 in (188 cm)
- Weight: 185 lb (84 kg; 13 st 3 lb)
- Position: Goaltender
- Caught: Left
- Played for: Cincinnati Stingers; Cleveland Crusaders; Los Angeles Kings; St. Louis Blues; Vancouver Canucks
- Playing career: 1959–1974

Jacques Joseph Caron (born April 21, 1940) is a Canadian former ice hockey player and coach. He played 72 games in the National Hockey League with the Los Angeles Kings, St. Louis Blues, and Vancouver Canucks between 1967 and 1974, and 26 games in the World Hockey Association with the Cleveland Crusaders and Cincinnati Stingers between 1975 and 1977. After his playing career, he worked as an assistant coach with the Hartford Whalers, and then as the goaltending coach and special assignment coach with the New Jersey Devils from 1993 to 2017. With New Jersey, he won the Stanley Cup three times.

== Career statistics ==
=== Regular season and playoffs ===
			Regular season									Playoffs
Season	Team	League	GP	W	L	T	MIN	GA	SO	GAA	SV%	GP	W	L	T	MIN	GA	SO	GAA	SV%
1956–57	Toronto Marlboros	OHA	10	—	—	—	600	29	2	2.90	—	—	—	—	—	—	—	—	—	—
1957–58	Peterborough Petes	OHA	31	—	—	—	1840	113	1	3.68	—	4	—	—	—	240	14	0	3.50	—
1958–59	Peterborough Petes	OHA	43	24	14	4	2580	129	2	3.00	—	13	9	3	1	780	35	2	2.69	—
1958–59	Peterborough Petes	M-Cup	—	—	—	—	—	—	—	—	—	2	0	2	0	120	9	0	4.50	—
1959–60	Washington Presidents	EHL	55	—	—	—	3300	218	3	3.97	—	—	—	—	—	—	—	—	—
1960–61	Rouyn-Noranda Alouettes	NOHA	—	—	—	—	—	—	—	—	—	—	—	—	—	—	—	—	—	—
1960–61	Rouyn-Noranda Alouettes	Al-Cup	—	—	—	—	—	—	—	—	—	3	0	3	0	180	13	0	4.33	—
1961–62	Springfield Indians	AHL	5	4	1	0	310	17	1	3.29	—	—	—	—	—	—	—	—	—	—
1961–62	Charlotte Clippers	EHL	5	—	—	—	300	26	0	5.20	—	—	—	—	—	—	—	—	—	—
1962–63	Springfield Indians	AHL	38	12	14	7	2180	112	2	3.08	—	—	—	—	—	—	—	—	—	—
1963–64	Springfield Indians	AHL	31	12	14	1	1780	110	0	3.71	—	—	—	—	—	—	—	—	—	—
1964–65	Springfield Indians	AHL	55	21	29	4	3321	195	2	3.52	—	—	—	—	—	—	—	—	—	—
1965–66	Springfield Indians	AHL	33	15	15	1	1832	80	2	2.62	—	6	3	3	0	360	14	0	2.33	—
1966–67	Springfield Indians	AHL	35	11	17	5	1866	136	1	4.37	—	—	—	—	—	—	—	—	—	—
1967–68	Los Angeles Kings	NHL	1	0	1	0	60	4	0	4.00	.892	—	—	—	—	—	—	—	—	—
1967–68	Springfield Kings	AHL	42	19	18	4	2393	151	0	3.79	—	—	—	—	—	—	—	—	—	—
1968–69	Los Angeles Kings	NHL	3	0	1	0	140	9	0	3.86	.868	—	—	—	—	—	—	—	—	—
1968–69	Denver Spurs	WHL	31	7	21	3	1764	122	2	4.15	—	—	—	—	—	—	—	—	—	—
1969–70	Denver Spurs	WHL	31	8	16	4	1548	120	0	4.65	—	—	—	—	—	—	—	—	—	—
1970–71	Denver Spurs	WHL	30	10	13	4	1668	109	2	3.92	—	2	0	2	0	120	9	0	4.50	—
1971–72	St. Louis Blues	NHL	28	14	8	5	1619	68	1	2.52	.912	9	4	5	—	499	26	0	3.13	.898
1971–72	Denver Spurs	WHL	20	15	3	0	1160	45	0	2.32	—	—	—	—	—	—	—	—	—	—
1972–73	St. Louis Blues	NHL	30	8	14	5	1562	92	1	3.53	.886	3	0	2	—	140	8	0	3.43	.896
1973–74	Vancouver Canucks	NHL	10	2	5	1	465	38	0	4.90	.832	—	—	—	—	—	—	—	—	—
1974–75	Syracuse Eagles	AHL	50	16	21	9	2755	170	0	3.70	—	1	0	1	0	60	8	0	8.00	—
1975–76	Syracuse Blazers	NAHL	32	—	—	—	1725	90	3	3.10	—	—	—	—	—	—	—	—	—	—
1975–76	Cleveland Crusaders	WHA	2	1	0	1	130	8	0	3.69	.896	—	—	—	—	—	—	—	—	—
1976–77	Syracuse Blazers	NAHL	22	—	—	—	1307	83	1	3.63	.876	—	—	—	—	—	—	—	—	—
1976–77	Cincinnati Stingers	WHA	24	13	6	2	1292	61	3	2.83	.892	1	0	1	0	14	3	0	12.86	—
1977–78	Binghamton Dusters	AHL	1	0	0	0	1	0	0	0.00	—	—	—	—	—	—	—	—	—	—
1980–81	Binghamton Whalers	AHL	1	0	0	0	19	1	0	3.16	—	—	—	—	—	—	—	—	—	—
WHA totals			26	14	6	3	1422	69	3	2.91	—	1	0	1	0	14	3	0	12.86	—
NHL totals			72	24	29	11	3846	211	2	3.29	.890	12	4	7	—	639	34	0	3.19	.898

== See also ==
- List of New Jersey Devils head coaches
