= Vic Hadfield =

Canadian ice hockey player (born 1940)

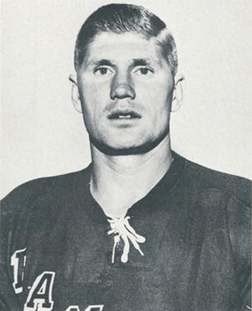
- Hadfield with the New York Rangers in 1964
- Born: October 4, 1940 (age 85) Oakville, Ontario, Canada
- Height: 6 ft 0 in (183 cm)
- Weight: 190 lb (86 kg; 13 st 8 lb)
- Position: Left wing
- Shot: Left
- Played for: New York Rangers; Pittsburgh Penguins
- National team: Canada
- Playing career: 1959–1977

Victor Edward Hadfield (born October 4, 1940) is a Canadian former professional ice hockey player. He played sixteen years in the National Hockey League (NHL), spending thirteen with the New York Rangers and three with the Pittsburgh Penguins.

== Early career ==
Hadfield played all of his minor hockey in Oakville before moving to the Dixie Bee Hives for one season. He was signed by the Chicago Black Hawks and assigned to their junior league affiliate, the St. Catharines Teepees of the Ontario Hockey League. He established himself as a physical presence, tallying many more penalty minutes than points. With a strong squad in 1959–60 that included future notable NHL players Chico Maki, Roger Crozier and Pat Stapleton, he averaged a point a game in the regular season and playoffs and racked up an average of five penalty minutes a game in the playoffs en route to the Teepees' second Memorial Cup championship.

He was assigned to Chicago's Buffalo Bisons farm team in the American Hockey League the following season. He was left unprotected after the 1960–61 season and claimed by the Rangers in the intra-league draft.

== NHL career ==
By the 1963–64 season, Hadfield had secured a place in the Rangers' lineup as an enforcer. Over time he concentrated more on scoring than on fighting, especially with the feared enforcer Reggie Fleming on the team. Hadfield had the first of five 100 penalty minutes in the 1963-64 season. He joined teammates Jean Ratelle and Rod Gilbert to form the famous GAG line (which stood for "goal a game"). From the 1967–68 season on Hadfield always scored at least 20 goals in any full season.

Hadfield's best season was 1971–72. Named the team's captain after the trade of longtime captain Bob Nevin, he became the first Ranger - and only the sixth NHL player - to score 50 goals in a season, nearly doubling his previous best marks; with his linemates Ratelle and Gilbert, the GAG Line collected a total of 139 goals and 325 points (which likely would've been more as Ratelle had to miss 15 games due to injury) on their way to the Stanley Cup Final, the first appearance for the team since 1950. In his only Stanley Cup Final appearance, Hadfield had just one goal and two assists as the Rangers lost to the Boston Bruins in six games. Hadfield reflected on the effectiveness of the line in a 2018 interview:

It’s a combination of things. I think as a line we each had our own particular role that we had to play. We were able to put it together. It’s not like today. Back then we were together for I think six, seven, eight years. Today you don’t even see two guys playing together for any length of time – plus practices. Jean could stick-handle and control the puck, Rod could shoot it. My role was to be aggressive and get into the corners and dig the puck out. And really that’s what it was, really repetitious, It was there every day, so we knew exactly where everybody was. You look back today, and I’m not a guy that’s looking for anything special (in terms of accolades) but when they put the line together we all had an idea of what we were going to be doing. The line holds the record in the National Hockey League for the most points on one line. That’ll never be broken because, like I said, two guys don’t even stay together, never mind three. But I don’t dwell on stuff like that because the main goal is to win the Stanley Cup. Personal shit didn’t really matter. It was nice, yeah, but our goal was to go into training camp and prepare ourselves to win that Cup, and anything less was, it was a void there.

The Rangers signed Hadfield to a controversial and lucrative five-year contract for $1 million in the summer of 1972 to deter him from defecting to the newly created World Hockey Association (which offered him a $1 million contract for four years). Hadfield was included on the roster for the Summit Series in September 1972 for Canada (as coached by Harry Sinden) against the Soviet Union but played in just two games and recorded no goals or assists. Not long after Team Canada arrived in Moscow for the final four games of the series, Hadfield, alongside Rick Martin and Jocelyn Guevremont, left the team and went home for what they felt was a lack of playing time.

The 1972-73 season saw Hadfield play in 63 games and record just 28 goals with 34 assists. In what ended up being his final season for New York in 1973, he scored 27 goals with 28 assists while having just one playoff goal in the Stanley Cup playoffs. He was traded to the Pittsburgh Penguins for Nick Beverley on May 28, 1974. He scored thirty goals in each of his two full seasons for the Penguins although he was plagued by injuries and weight troubles. Near the end of the 1975–76 season he sustained a knee injury which forced his retirement.

== Legacy ==
At the time of his retirement, Hadfield was fourth in Rangers' franchise history in goals, assists, and points (behind his linemates Jean Ratelle and Rod Gilbert, and Andy Bathgate), second in penalty minutes (behind Harry Howell) and fourth in games played (behind Ratelle, Howell and Gilbert). He currently stands ninth in scoring and third in penalty minutes in the Rangers history.

In the 2009 book 100 Ranger Greats, the authors ranked Hadfield at No. 20 all-time of the 901 New York Rangers who had played during the team's first 82 seasons.

In February 2018, days after retiring the jersey of Ratelle, the Rangers announced Hadfield would have his #11 jersey retired much to his surprise. His jersey was retired on December 2, 2018, with several teammates and various Ranger legends (including Mark Messier, who previously had his #11 retired by New York) attending the ceremony. He was the tenth Ranger to have his jersey retired and he was the final member of the "GAG" line to have his jersey retired by the team.

== Personal life ==
His younger brother, Carl, was drafted in 1964 by the Chicago Black Hawks. Hadfield now owns the Vic Hadfield Driving Range and instructional centre in Oakville, Ontario.

Vic's grandson Victor Hadfield is an ice hockey defenseman with the Reading Royals of the ECHL. Victor previously played for the Barrie Colts of the OHL and the Manitoba Moose of the AHL.

== Career statistics ==
=== Regular season and playoffs ===
			Regular season					Playoffs
Season	Team	League	GP	G	A	Pts	PIM	GP	G	A	Pts	PIM
1958–59	St. Catharines Teepees	OHA-Jr.	51	6	14	20	72	7	1	2	3	12
1959–60	St. Catharines Teepees	OHA-Jr.	48	19	34	53	130	17	11	13	24	84
1959–60	Buffalo Bisons	AHL	1	0	0	0	0	—	—	—	—	—
1959–60	St. Catharines Teepees	MC	—	—	—	—	—	14	6	8	14	60
1960–61	Buffalo Bisons	AHL	62	5	16	21	111	3	0	0	0	11
1961–62	New York Rangers	NHL	44	3	1	4	22	4	0	0	0	2
1962–63	New York Rangers	NHL	36	5	6	11	32	—	—	—	—	—
1962–63	Baltimore Clippers	AHL	29	10	9	19	84	—	—	—	—	—
1963–64	New York Rangers	NHL	69	14	11	25	151	—	—	—	—	—
1964–65	New York Rangers	NHL	70	18	20	38	102	—	—	—	—	—
1965–66	New York Rangers	NHL	69	16	19	35	117	—	—	—	—	—
1966–67	New York Rangers	NHL	69	13	20	33	80	4	1	0	1	17
1967–68	New York Rangers	NHL	59	20	19	39	45	6	1	2	3	6
1968–69	New York Rangers	NHL	73	26	40	66	108	4	2	1	3	2
1969–70	New York Rangers	NHL	71	20	34	54	69	—	—	—	—	—
1970–71	New York Rangers	NHL	63	22	22	44	38	13	8	5	13	46
1971–72	New York Rangers	NHL	78	50	56	106	142	16	7	9	16	22
1972–73	New York Rangers	NHL	63	28	34	62	60	9	2	2	4	11
1973–74	New York Rangers	NHL	77	27	28	55	75	6	1	0	1	0
1974–75	Pittsburgh Penguins	NHL	78	31	42	73	72	9	4	2	6	0
1975–76	Pittsburgh Penguins	NHL	76	30	35	65	46	3	1	0	1	11
1976–77	Pittsburgh Penguins	NHL	9	0	2	2	0	—	—	—	—	—
NHL totals			1,004	323	389	712	1,159	74	27	21	48	117

=== International ===
Year	Team	Event	GP	G	A	Pts	PIM
1972	Canada	SS	2	0	0	0	0

== Awards and achievements ==
- OHA-Jr. first All-Star team (1960)
- NHL Second All-Star team (1972)
- Played in NHL All-Star Game (1965, 1972)

== See also ==
- List of NHL players with 1,000 games played
- List of NHL players with 100-point seasons

Sporting positions
Preceded by Bob Nevin	New York Rangers captain 1971–1974	Succeeded by Brad Park
