= Bill Masterton Memorial Trophy =

NHL ice hockey award

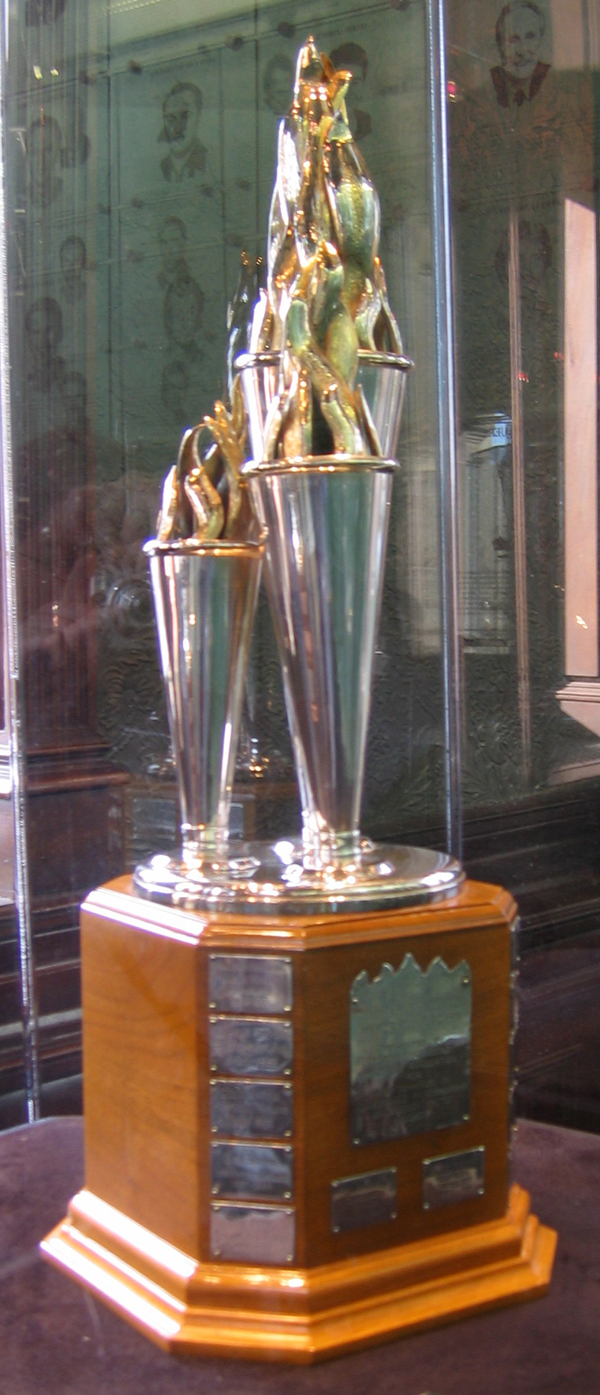
- Sport: Ice hockey
- Awarded for: National Hockey League player who best exemplifies the qualities of perseverance, sportsmanship, and dedication to ice hockey.

History
- First award: 1967–68 NHL season
- First winner: Claude Provost
- Most recent: Sean Monahan; Columbus Blue Jackets

The Bill Masterton Memorial Trophy is awarded annually to the National Hockey League player who best exemplifies the qualities of perseverance, sportsmanship, and dedication to ice hockey. It is named after Bill Masterton, the only player in NHL history to die as a direct result of injuries suffered during a game. The winner is selected by a poll of the Professional Hockey Writers' Association after each team nominates one player in competition. It is often awarded to a player who has come back from career– or even life-threatening illness or injury.

== History ==
The trophy is named in honor of the late Bill Masterton, a Minnesota North Stars player who died on January 15, 1968, after sustaining an injury during a hockey game. During his playing career, Masterton exhibited "to a high degree the qualities of perseverance, sportsmanship, and dedication to hockey". A US college standout at Denver University, Masterton had briefly played in the Montreal Canadiens organization before giving up his professional dreams and taking a job as an engineer at Honeywell in Minneapolis. During his spare time, he played senior amateur hockey including for the US national team, where he was scouted by the expansion North Stars and became the club's first contracted player. It was first awarded following the 1967–68 regular season. As of the end of the 2018–19 NHL season, players for the New York Rangers and Montreal Canadiens have won the trophy five times; players for the Boston Bruins and Philadelphia Flyers have won the trophy four times; and players for the Los Angeles Kings, the Pittsburgh Penguins and the New York Islanders have won the trophy three times. Players on Western Conference teams have won the award only 18 times since the award was first given in the 1960s.

== Winners ==
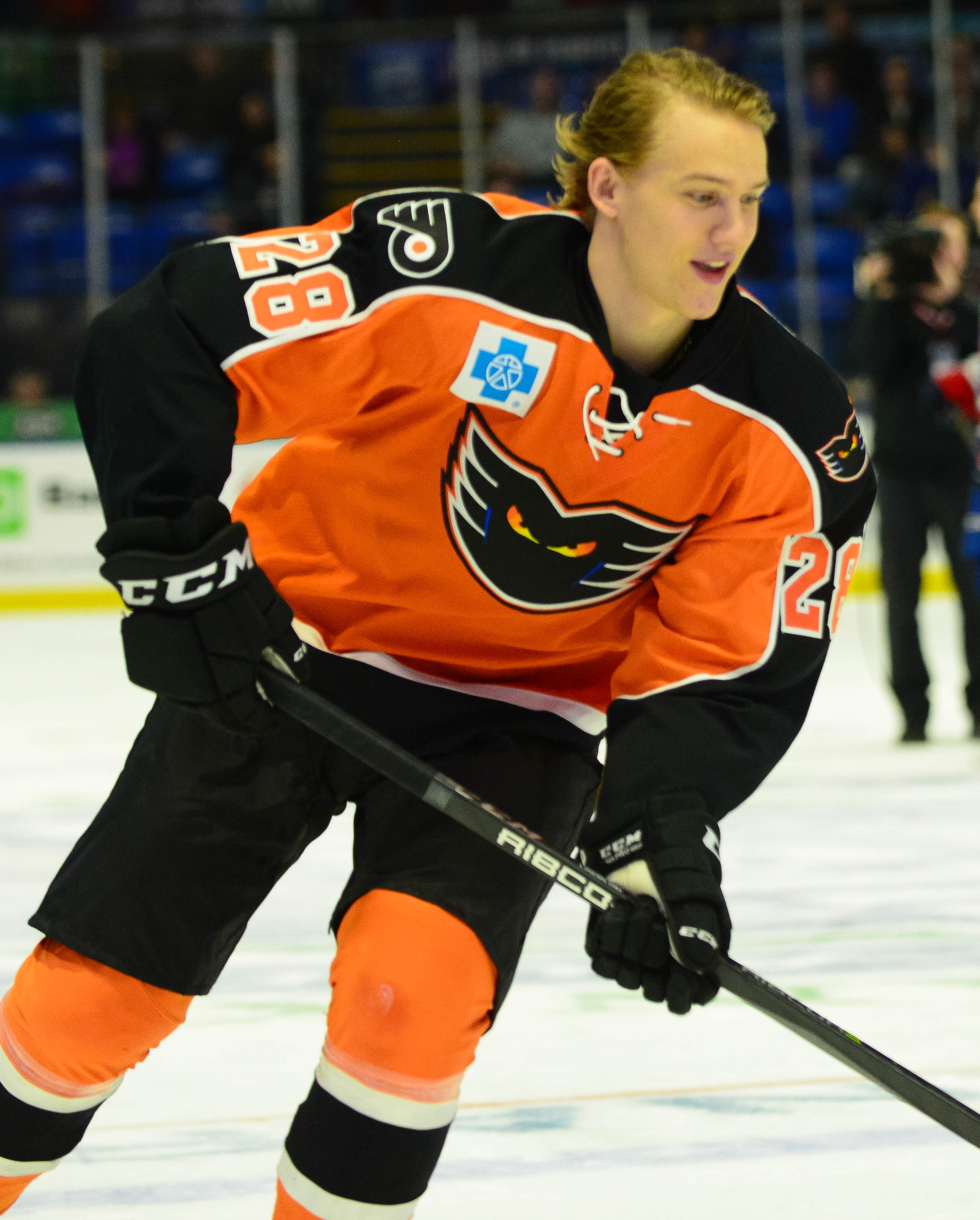
Oskar Lindblom, the winner for the 2020–21 season.

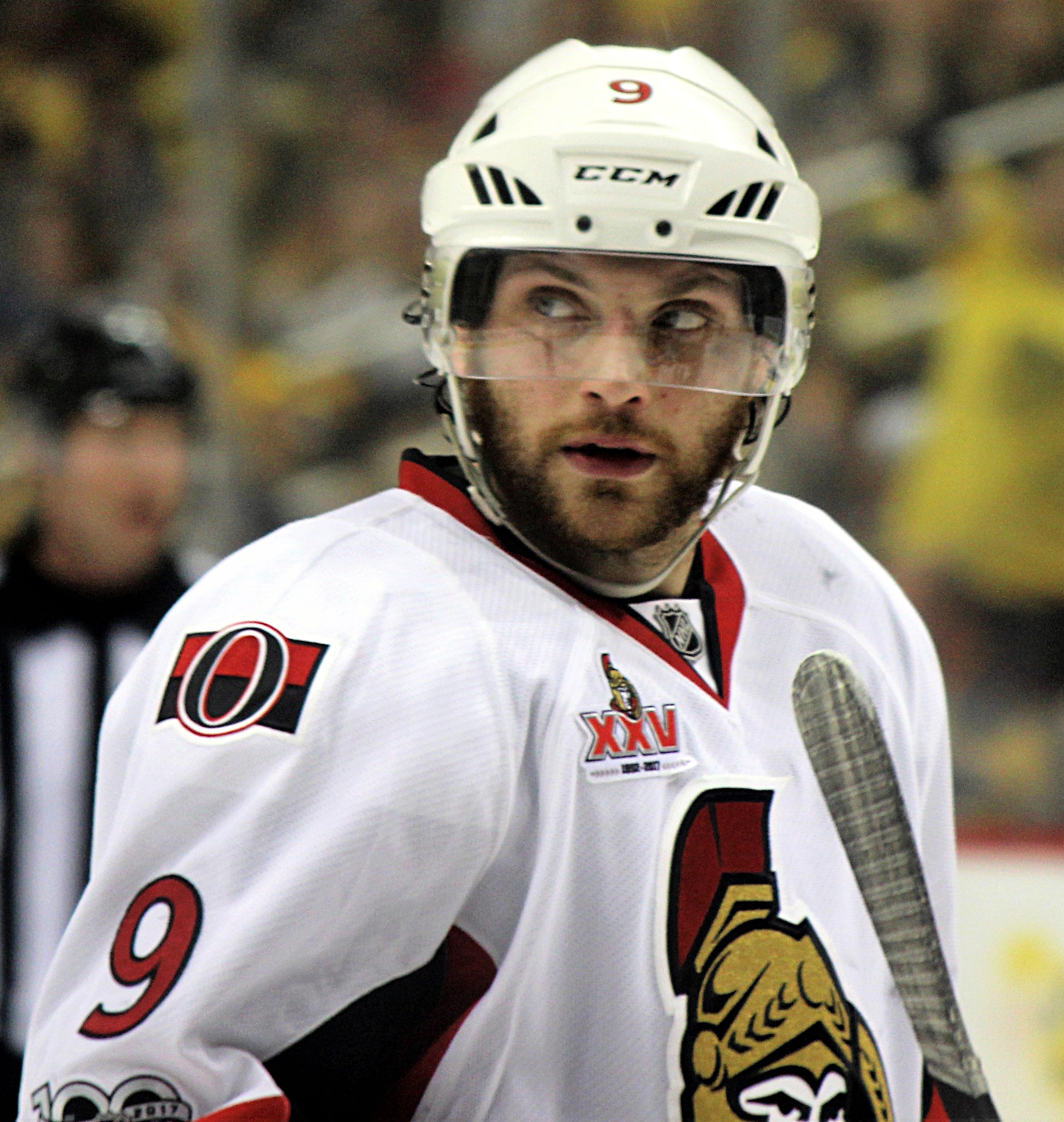
Bobby Ryan, the winner for the 2019–20 season.

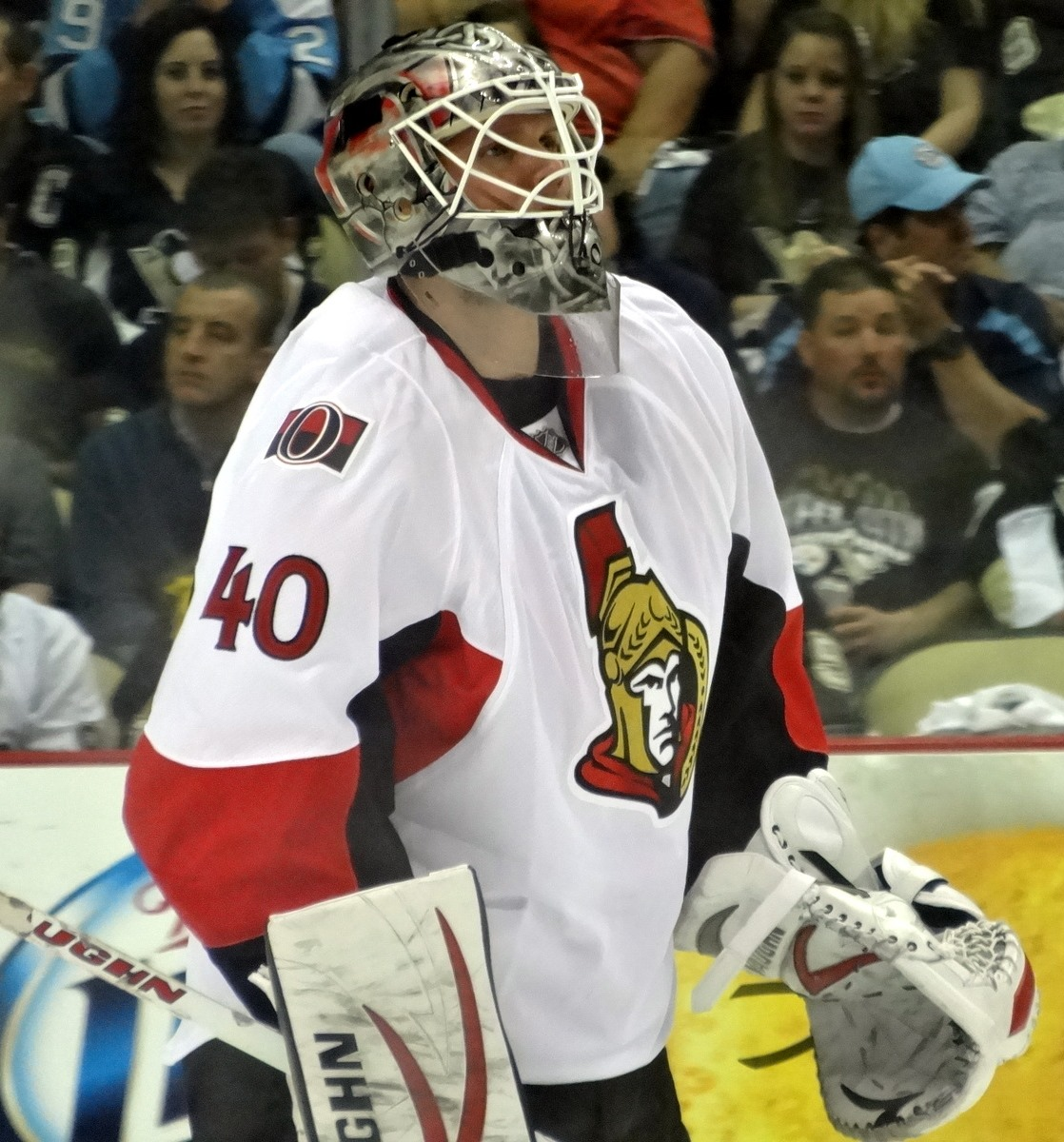
Robin Lehner, the winner for the 2018–19 season.

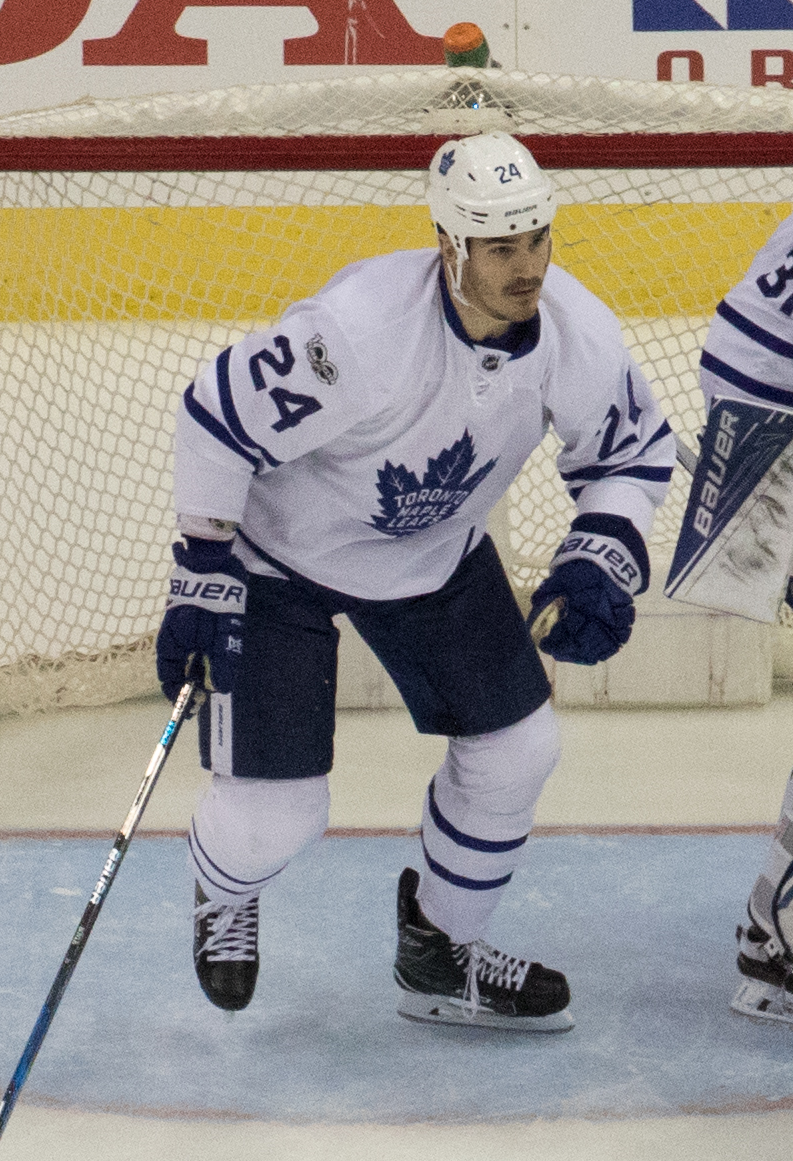
Brian Boyle, the winner for the 2017–18 season.

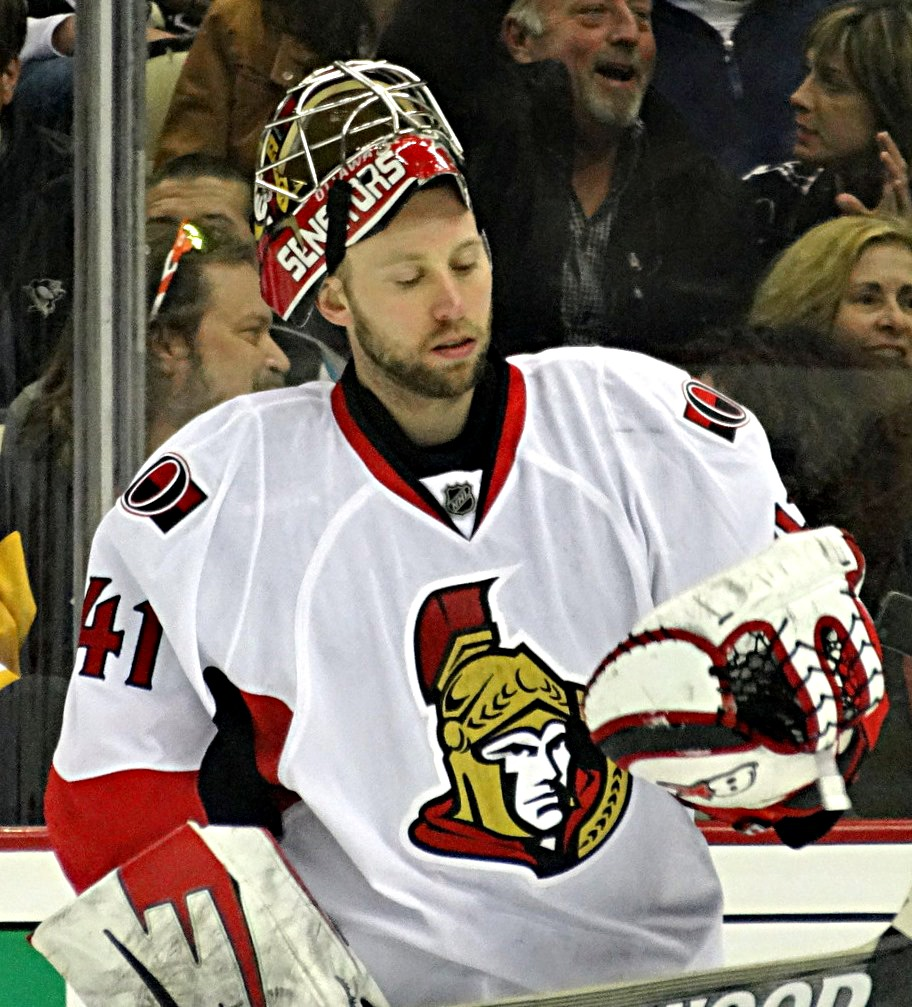
Craig Anderson, the winner for the 2016–17 season.

Player is still active

Season	Winner	Team	Reasons for winning
1967–68	Claude Provost	Montreal Canadiens	"Embodied the definition of perseverance and dedication to hockey" throughout his 15-year career.
1968–69	Ted Hampson	Oakland Seals	Had his best statistical year on a recent expansion team.
1969–70	Pit Martin	Chicago Black Hawks	After denouncing the Hawks at the end of the 1968–69 NHL season, Martin and his team came back to finish first in the league, and Martin had 30 goals and 33 assists for 63 points.
1970–71	Jean Ratelle	New York Rangers	A 20-year veteran, he won the trophy for a "lifelong dedication to strong, clean hockey".
1971–72	Bobby Clarke	Philadelphia Flyers	Overcame diabetes to play in the NHL.
1972–73	Lowell MacDonald	Pittsburgh Penguins	Overcame severe ligament and cartilage damage to his knee and scored 34 goals and 41 assists for 75 points during the 1972–73 NHL season.
1973–74	Henri Richard	Montreal Canadiens	He won his 11th Stanley Cup the previous year, the most anyone has ever won as a player.
1974–75	Don Luce	Buffalo Sabres	Awarded for perseverance and dedication, after a 38-point increase in scoring from the previous season.
1975–76	Rod Gilbert	New York Rangers	Overcame a serious back injury early during his career.
1976–77	Ed Westfall	New York Islanders	Awarded for being a good leader.
1977–78	Butch Goring	Los Angeles Kings	Made the NHL despite his small overall stature and weight, and had consistently good seasons.
1978–79	Serge Savard	Montreal Canadiens	Awarded for "dedication to hockey", after he won his eighth Stanley Cup in eleven seasons.
1979–80	Al MacAdam	Minnesota North Stars	Rewarded for his perseverance after scoring a career-high 42 goals and 51 assists (93 points).
1980–81	Blake Dunlop	St. Louis Blues	Although he was a star in junior hockey, he only broke out during the 1980–81 NHL season, after being drafted during the 1973–74 NHL season, by scoring 20 goals and 67 assists for 87 points. It was awarded for perseverance.
1981–82	Glenn Resch	Colorado Rockies	Awarded for perseverance, as he gave his young team more confidence while he served as its goaltender.
1982–83	Lanny McDonald	Calgary Flames	Presented for his dedication; scored 66 goals and 32 assists for 98 points.
1983–84	Brad Park	Detroit Red Wings	Awarded for his dedication to hockey, having played for teams that qualified for the playoffs for 17 straight seasons without winning the Stanley Cup.
1984–85	Anders Hedberg	New York Rangers	Recognized for a dedicated career, scoring 20 or more goals in every full season he participated in. He was also one of the first Swedish stars to play in the NHL.
1985–86	Charlie Simmer	Boston Bruins	Overcame serious ligament damage to his knee to score 60 points.
1986–87	Doug Jarvis	Hartford Whalers	Awarded during the season in which he played his 915th consecutive game, beating Garry Unger's record. He retired having improved the record to 964.
1987–88	Bob Bourne	Los Angeles Kings	Awarded for exemplifying the qualities of dedication and perseverance.
1988–89	Tim Kerr	Philadelphia Flyers	He returned to score 48 goals and 40 assists for 88 points in 69 games after overcoming severe knee and shoulder injuries, as well as aseptic meningitis the season before.
1989–90	Gord Kluzak	Boston Bruins	Tried to overcome severe knee injuries, but after playing two games after his tenth knee operation, he retired.
1990–91	Dave Taylor	Los Angeles Kings	Played his entire 17-season career with the Kings, and was honored for his dedication.
1991–92	Mark Fitzpatrick	New York Islanders	Overcame Eosinophilia–myalgia syndrome, a potentially life-threatening disease, and returned to the NHL.
1992–93	Mario Lemieux	Pittsburgh Penguins	Missed 24 games because of Hodgkin's lymphoma, yet still won his fourth Art Ross Trophy with 160 points.
1993–94	Cam Neely	Boston Bruins	Awarded "to recognize his valiant efforts to return to NHL action after suffering career-threatening injuries"; however, those injuries caused his retirement after the 1995–96 NHL season.
1994–95	Pat LaFontaine	Buffalo Sabres	Overcame a series of serious head injuries.
1995–96	Gary Roberts	Calgary Flames	Successfully recovered from possibly career-ending surgery to correct bone spurs and nerve damage.
1996–97	Tony Granato	San Jose Sharks	Overcame possibly career-ending brain injury sustained during the previous season to score 25 goals during this season.
1997–98	Jamie McLennan	St. Louis Blues	Overcame bacterial meningitis.
1998–99	John Cullen	Tampa Bay Lightning	Overcame non-Hodgkin lymphoma.
1999–2000	Ken Daneyko	New Jersey Devils	Overcame alcoholism.
2000–01	Adam Graves	New York Rangers	Awarded for all-around dedication to hockey.
2001–02	Saku Koivu	Montreal Canadiens	Overcame non-Hodgkin lymphoma.
2002–03	Steve Yzerman	Detroit Red Wings	Eventually overcame several health problems, but played only a small part of the season.
2003–04	Bryan Berard	Chicago Blackhawks	Overcame an injury that rendered him legally blind in one eye.
2004–05	Season cancelled due to the 2004–05 NHL lockout		
2005–06	Teemu Selanne	Mighty Ducks of Anaheim	Overcame major knee surgery to get 90 points (40 goals and 50 assists).
2006–07	Phil Kessel	Boston Bruins	Missed 12 games because of testicular cancer mid-season but returned to play full-time.
2007–08	Jason Blake	Toronto Maple Leafs	Despite his diagnosis with chronic myelogenous leukemia, he played all 82 games of the season.
2008–09	Steve Sullivan	Nashville Predators	Played 41 games this season after missing nearly two years due to a fragmented disc in his back, and a strained groin.
2009–10	Jose Theodore	Washington Capitals	Had his best season since 2001–02 following his son Chase's death in 2009 from complications stemming from his premature birth.
2010–11	Ian Laperriere	Philadelphia Flyers	Diagnosed with post-concussion syndrome after being hit in the face with a puck while blocking a shot during the 2010 Stanley Cup playoffs; did not play again after the injury, but "continued to serve the team in several capacities."
2011–12	Max Pacioretty	Montreal Canadiens	Was knocked out of the 2010–11 season following a hit that left him with a concussion and a fractured vertebra. Pacioretty returned in 2011–12, which would prove to be his breakout season with, at the time, his most productive year. (33 goals and 32 assists).
2012–13	Josh Harding	Minnesota Wild	Earned a shutout in his first start after being diagnosed with multiple sclerosis in the off-season, then missed 33 games before returning late in the season and starting five playoff games.
2013–14	Dominic Moore	New York Rangers	Returned to the NHL in the 2013–14 season after taking an 18-month leave of absence from the league in the spring of 2012 to care for his wife, Katie, following her diagnosis with a rare form of liver cancer. She died in January 2013.
2014–15	Devan Dubnyk	Minnesota Wild	Led the last-place Wild to the playoffs following a mid-season trade, going 27–9–2 with a 1.78 goals-against average, .936 save percentage and five shutouts. The Wild were Dubnyk's fifth team over the previous two seasons.
2015–16	Jaromir Jagr	Florida Panthers	At the age of 44, led the Panthers in points (66) and was second in goals (27), as the team earned its first Atlantic Division title and returned to the playoffs after a four-year absence. Jagr became the oldest player to surpass 60 points. He was commended for his work ethic and off-ice mentorship.
2016–17	Craig Anderson	Ottawa Senators	Helped his team advance to the Eastern Conference Final after leaving mid-season to be with his wife, Nicholle, who was diagnosed with nasopharyngeal carcinoma, a form of cancer that originates in the upper part of the throat behind the nose.
2017–18	Brian Boyle	New Jersey Devils	Diagnosed with myeloid leukemia, a type of bone marrow cancer at the beginning of training camp. He returned to the NHL on November 1 and scored 10 goals over his first 25 games.
2018–19	Robin Lehner	New York Islanders	After publicly revealing struggles with alcoholism and bipolar disorder in the offseason, had a career-low 2.13 goals against average in the regular season with the Islanders, which was the lowest total since the mid-1980s.
2019–20	Bobby Ryan	Ottawa Senators	After publicly revealing struggles with alcoholism and post-traumatic stress disorder, in an effort to help others with addiction issues, he returned to the NHL, scoring a hat trick in his first home game back.
2020–21	Oskar Lindblom	Philadelphia Flyers	After being diagnosed with Ewing's sarcoma in the middle of the 2019–20 season, he returned in the playoffs that year and played a full season in 2020–21.
2021–22	Carey Price	Montreal Canadiens	Publicly disclosed and sought treatment for substance abuse, and worked for months on a protracted recovery from offseason knee surgery, before returning to play five games at the end of the season.
2022–23	Kris Letang	Pittsburgh Penguins	Suffered a stroke, the second of his career, after initially suffering from a stroke in January 2014. He returned to play 12 days later. Additionally, he missed time due to a broken foot and the death of his father, Claude, within the same month, still returning to play weeks later.
2023–24	Connor Ingram	Arizona Coyotes	Nearly retired in 2021 due to clinical depression and obsessive-compulsive disorder, before entering the NHL Player Assistance Program. Led the league in shutouts in 2023–24 and was named First Star of the Week in December, after winning four consecutive games against the past four Stanley Cup champions.
2024–25	Sean Monahan	Columbus Blue Jackets	Monahan had signed with Columbus prior to the 2024-25 season to reunite with his longtime Calgary Flames teammate and best friend, Johnny Gaudreau. Before the season began, Gaudreau and his brother Matthew were struck and killed by a drunk driver while cycling in Oldmans Township, New Jersey. Monahan dedicated the season to Gaudreau's memory and scored 57 points in 54 games, third among Blue Jackets players.
2025–26	Gabriel Landeskog	Colorado Avalanche	Due to knee injuries, underwent four surgical procedures and missed the entire 2022–23 and 2023–24 seasons, as well as the 2024–25 regular season, before returning for the 2025 Stanley Cup playoffs. Also missed a month of the 2025–26 season with broken ribs, while leading the Avalanche to the Presidents' Trophy.

== See also ==
- List of National Hockey League awards
- List of NHL players
- List of NHL statistical leaders
