= 1971–72 NHL season =

National Hockey League season

- League: National Hockey League
- Sport: Ice hockey
- Duration: October 8, 1971 – May 11, 1972
- Games: 78
- Teams: 14
- TV partner(s): CBC, CTV, SRC (Canada); CBS (United States)

Draft
- Top draft pick: Guy Lafleur
- Picked by: Montreal Canadiens

Regular season
- Season champions: Boston Bruins
- Season MVP: Bobby Orr (Bruins)
- Top scorer: Phil Esposito (Bruins)

Playoffs
- Playoffs MVP: Bobby Orr (Bruins)

Stanley Cup
- Champions: Boston Bruins
- Runners-up: New York Rangers

NHL seasons
- 1970–71 1972–73

The 1971–72 NHL season was the 55th season of the National Hockey League. Fourteen teams each played 78 games. The Boston Bruins beat the New York Rangers four games to two for their second Stanley Cup in three seasons in the finals.

== Amateur draft ==
The 1971 NHL amateur draft was held on June 10 at the Queen Elizabeth Hotel in Montreal, Quebec. Guy Lafleur was selected first overall by the Montreal Canadiens.

== Regular season ==
Among notable first-year players this season were Montreal's Guy Lafleur, who, despite scoring 29 goals, was seen as lacking in comparison to newly retired superstar Jean Beliveau by the Canadiens' faithful; Buffalo's Rick Martin, who set a new record for goals by a rookie with 44; Gilles Meloche, goaltender for the California Golden Seals, who acquired him from Chicago; and Ken Dryden, the new goalie for the Canadiens, who, despite winning the Conn Smythe Trophy as playoff MVP the previous season, was awarded the Calder Memorial Trophy as rookie of the year on the grounds that he had only played six prior regular season games.

43-year-old Gump Worsley, left unprotected (and unclaimed) in the waiver draft by the Minnesota North Stars, led the league with a 2.12 goals against average. Less fortunately, Philadelphia goaltender Bruce Gamble suffered a heart attack during a 3–1 win in Vancouver in February and was forced to retire from hockey.

In what was widely seen as a preemptive move to help forestall the incipient World Hockey Association, the NHL announced that Atlanta and Long Island had been granted expansion franchises to begin play in the 1972–73 season. The bids had been hastily put together in comparison with the 1967 and 1970 expansions.

Milestones this season included Gerry Cheevers setting an NHL record for the Boston Bruins (which has yet to be surpassed) with 33 straight undefeated games. On February 12, it was Gordie Howe Day in Detroit as his famous #9 was retired. On March 25, Bobby Hull scored his 600th NHL goal in a 5–5 tie with Boston at the Boston Garden.

A scoring race in which Ranger Jean Ratelle had been leading Bruin Phil Esposito was shortcircuited when Ratelle broke his ankle in a game against California, putting him out for over a month of play. Ratelle still ended up third in scoring behind Esposito and Bruin Bobby Orr, while his teammates Vic Hadfield and Rod Gilbert – all three linemates on the GAG line—finished fourth and fifth. Frank Mahovlich, rejuvenated by a trade to Montreal, finished sixth, while Bobby Hull, in his final year in Chicago, finished seventh in points and second to Esposito in goals.

Although they had fallen somewhat from their overwhelming offensive dominance from the previous season, once again the Boston Bruins had the best record in the league, while the Chicago Black Hawks topped the West Division.

=== Final standings ===
East Division
		GP	W	L	T	GF	GA	DIFF	Pts
1	Boston Bruins	78	54	13	11	330	204	+126	119
2	New York Rangers	78	48	17	13	317	192	+125	109
3	Montreal Canadiens	78	46	16	16	307	205	+102	108
4	Toronto Maple Leafs	78	33	31	14	209	208	+1	80
5	Detroit Red Wings	78	33	35	10	261	262	−1	76
6	Buffalo Sabres	78	16	43	19	203	289	−86	51
7	Vancouver Canucks	78	20	50	8	203	297	−94	48

West Division
		GP	W	L	T	GF	GA	DIFF	Pts
1	Chicago Black Hawks	78	46	17	15	256	166	+90	107
2	Minnesota North Stars	78	37	29	12	212	191	+21	86
3	St. Louis Blues	78	28	39	11	208	247	−39	67
4	Pittsburgh Penguins	78	26	38	14	220	258	−38	66
5	Philadelphia Flyers	78	26	38	14	200	236	−36	66
6	California Golden Seals	78	21	39	18	216	288	−72	60
7	Los Angeles Kings	78	20	49	9	206	305	−99	49

== Playoffs ==
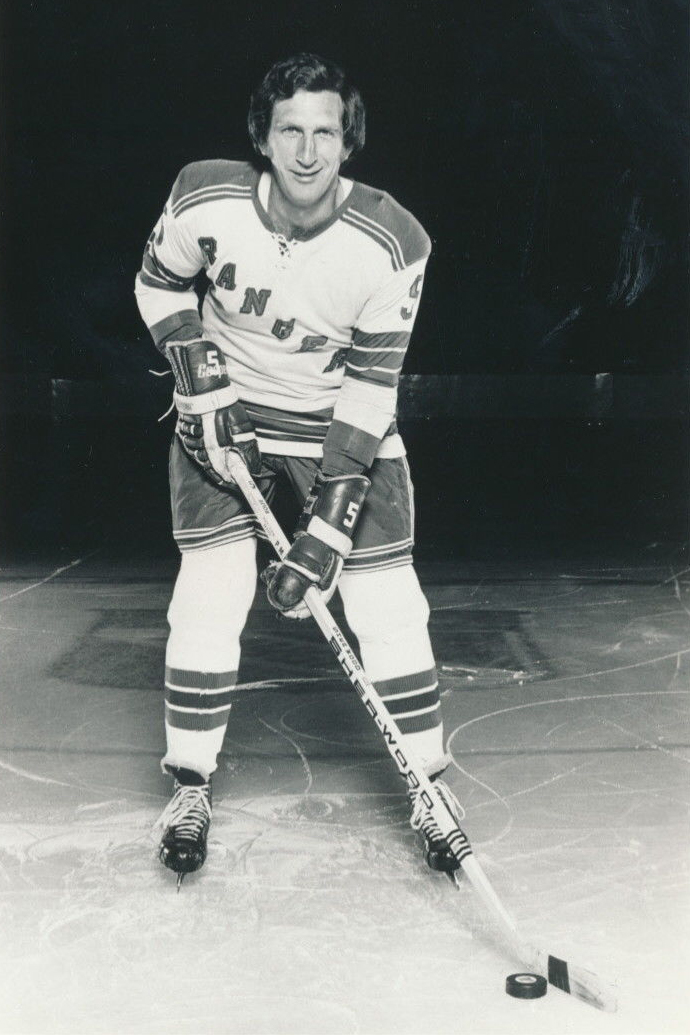
Dale Rolfe with the New York Rangers in 1971

Despite injuries to several key players, notably leading scorer Jean Ratelle, the New York Rangers beat the defending champions Montreal Canadiens in the first round of the playoffs, with strong play from unheralded players such as Walt Tkaczuk. The Rangers went on the sweep the Chicago Black Hawks in four straight games during the semi-final. Chicago had beaten the Pittsburgh Penguins in four straight games.

Boston easily handled the Toronto Maple Leafs in five games, facing a St. Louis Blues team that had eked out a hard-fought seven-game victory against the North Stars in the quarter-final. The powerful Bruins set a record for the most goals in a four-game series by pounding the Blues 28–8 over a four-game sweep.

=== Playoff bracket ===
For decades, the NHL had used first-round playoff formats where first-place teams played third-place teams, and second-place teams played fourth-place teams. In response to the prior year when the Minnesota North Stars appeared to intentionally lose games to finish fourth in the West instead of third and avoid a tougher match-up with first-place Chicago, and also the Boston Bruins were "rewarded" for finishing first in the East with a tough series against eventual Stanley Cup Champion Montreal, the first round match-ups were changed so that the first-place team in each division played the fourth-place team, and the other two teams from the division play each other, with the second-placed team having home-ice advantage.

The inter-divisional semifinals were thus modified accordingly, with winner of each #1 vs. #4 series now playing the winner of the #2 vs. #3 series in the other division. The winners of the semifinals then advanced to the Stanley Cup Finals.

Teams remained competing in a best-of-seven series in each round (scores in the bracket indicate the number of games won in each best-of-seven series).

Quarterfinals
E1	Boston	4
E4	Toronto	1
W2	Minnesota	3
W3	St. Louis	4
W1	Chicago	4
W4	Pittsburgh	0
E2	New York	4
E3	Montreal	2

Semifinals
E1	Boston	4
W3	St. Louis	0
W1	Chicago	0
E2	New York	4

Stanley Cup Finals
E1	Boston	4
E2	New York	2

=== Quarterfinals ===
==== (E1) Boston Bruins vs. (E4) Toronto Maple Leafs ====
The Boston Bruins finished first in the league with 119 points. The Toronto Maple Leafs finished fourth in the East Division with 80 points. This was the twelfth playoff series between these two teams with Toronto winning eight of the eleven previous series. They last met in the 1969 Stanley Cup Quarterfinals which Boston won in four games. Boston won this year's six-game regular season series earning nine of twelve points.

April 5	Toronto Maple Leafs	0–5	Boston Bruins	Boston Garden	Recap
No scoring		First period	No scoring
No scoring		Second period	17:24 – Phil Esposito (1); 19:41 – Phil Esposito (2)
No scoring		Third period	03:47 – Don Marcotte (1); 15:27 – John McKenzie (1); 15:38 – Fred Stanfield (1)
Jacques Plante 24 saves / 29 shots		Goalie stats	Gerry Cheevers 27 saves / 27 shots

April 6	Toronto Maple Leafs	4–3	OT	Boston Bruins	Boston Garden	Recap
No scoring		First period		07:23 – Fred Stanfield (2); 14:01 – Phil Esposito (3)
Dave Keon (1) – 01:23; Jim McKenny (1) – pp – 03:47		Second period		04:27 – Johnny Bucyk (1)
Guy Trottier (1) – 08:42		Third period		No scoring
Jim Harrison (1) – 02:58		First overtime period		No scoring
Bernie Parent 37 saves / 40 shots		Goalie stats		Gerry Cheevers 18 saves / 22 shots

April 8	Boston Bruins	2–0	Toronto Maple Leafs	Maple Leaf Gardens	Recap
No scoring		First period	No scoring
Mike Walton (1) – pp – 18:38		Second period	No scoring
Bobby Orr (1) – pp – 01:24		Third period	No scoring
Eddie Johnston 30 saves / 30 shots		Goalie stats	Bernie Parent 33 saves / 35 shots

April 9	Boston Bruins	5–4	Toronto Maple Leafs	Maple Leaf Gardens	Recap
Johnny Bucyk (2) – 16:36		First period	17:45 – Dave Keon (2)
No scoring		Second period	11:11 – pp – Ron Ellis (1); 17:57 – sh – Jim McKenny (2)
Ken Hodge (1) – 01:15; Ed Westfall (1) – sh – 08:03; Phil Esposito (4) – 09:49; Ken Hodge (2) – 16:11		Third period	04:50 – Paul Henderson (1)
Eddie Johnston 38 saves / 42 shots		Goalie stats	Bernie Parent 31 saves / 36 shots

April 11	Toronto Maple Leafs	2–3	Boston Bruins	Boston Garden	Recap
Jim McKenny (3) – pp – 11:12		First period	15:42 – Fred Stanfield (3)
No scoring		Second period	05:18 – John McKenzie (2)
Norm Ullman (1) – 06:09		Third period	07:38 – Ken Hodge (3)
Bernie Parent 34 saves / 37 shots		Goalie stats	Gerry Cheevers 26 saves / 28 shots

Boston won series 4–1

==== (E2) New York Rangers vs. (E3) Montreal Canadiens ====
The New York Rangers finished second in the East Division with 109 points. The Montreal Canadiens finished third with 108 points. This was the tenth playoff series between these two teams with Montreal winning five of the nine previous series. They last met in the 1969 Stanley Cup Quarterfinals which Montreal won in four games. New York won this year's six-game regular season series earning eight of twelve points.

April 5	Montreal Canadiens	2–3	New York Rangers	Madison Square Garden	Recap
Claude Larose (1) – 18:55		First period	16:30 – pp – Bill Fairbairn (1); 19:32 – Vic Hadfield (1)
No scoring		Second period	No scoring
Frank Mahovlich (1) – 07:48		Third period	12:43 – Vic Hadfield (2)
Ken Dryden 34 saves / 37 shots		Goalie stats	Eddie Giacomin 17 saves / 19 shots

April 6	Montreal Canadiens	2–5	New York Rangers	Madison Square Garden	Recap
Guy Lafleur (1) – 06:05		First period	07:45 – Dale Rolfe (1); 10:26 – Ron Stewart (1)
Claude Larose (2) – 02:29		Second period	No scoring
No scoring		Third period	00:20 – Bill Fairbairn (2); 15:34 – Walt Tkaczuk (1); 18:57 – Ted Irvine (1)
Ken Dryden 31 saves / 35 shots		Goalie stats	Eddie Giacomin 26 saves / 28 shots

April 8	New York Rangers	1–2	Montreal Canadiens	Montreal Forum	Recap
No scoring		First period	No scoring
No scoring		Second period	07:18 – pp – Frank Mahovlich (2); 18:13 – Marc Tardif (1)
Ron Stewart (2) – 07:21		Third period	No scoring
Eddie Giacomin 24 saves / 26 shots		Goalie stats	Ken Dryden 22 saves / 23 shots

April 9	New York Rangers	6–4	Montreal Canadiens	Montreal Forum	Recap
Bill Fairbairn (3) – pp – 04:47; Bobby Rousseau (1) – 07:24; Bobby Rousseau (2) – 13:48; Vic Hadfield (3) – 19:41		First period	11:22 – Jacques Lemaire (1); 18:15 – Marc Tardif (2)
No scoring		Second period	13:21 – Yvan Cournoyer (1)
Pete Stemkowski (1) – 14:55; Ted Irvine (2) – 19:26		Third period	05:48 – Terry Harper (1)
Eddie Giacomin 29 saves / 33 shots		Goalie stats	Ken Dryden 23 saves / 28 shots

April 11	Montreal Canadiens	2–1	New York Rangers	Madison Square Garden	Recap
No scoring		First period	No scoring
Frank Mahovlich (3) – 06:53		Second period	04:24 – pp – Vic Hadfield (4)
Jim Roberts (1) – 03:12		Third period	No scoring
Ken Dryden 33 saves / 34 shots		Goalie stats	Eddie Giacomin 30 saves / 32 shots

April 13	New York Rangers	3–2	Montreal Canadiens	Montreal Forum	Recap
Bill Fairbairn (4) – 09:31		First period	11:32 – Yvan Cournoyer (2)
Bill Fairbairn (5) – 09:33		Second period	14:48 – Jacques Lemaire (2)
Walt Tkaczuk (2) – 00:29		Third period	No scoring
Eddie Giacomin 23 saves / 25 shots		Goalie stats	Ken Dryden 32 saves / 35 shots

New York won series 4–2

==== (W1) Chicago Black Hawks vs. (W4) Pittsburgh Penguins ====
The Chicago Black Hawks finished first in the West Division with 107 points. The Pittsburgh Penguins finished fourth in the West Division with 66 points (winning the tiebreaker with Philadelphia in head-to-head season series 3–2–1). This was the first playoff series between these two teams. Chicago won this year's six-game regular season series earning eleven of twelve points.

April 5	Pittsburgh Penguins	1–3	Chicago Black Hawks	Chicago Stadium	Recap
Bobby Leiter (1) – 01:25		First period	15:09 – Pit Martin (1)
No scoring		Second period	No scoring
No scoring		Third period	03:25 – sh – Jim Pappin (1); 16:37 – Pit Martin (2)
Jim Rutherford 35 saves / 38 shots		Goalie stats	Tony Esposito 28 saves / 29 shots

April 6	Pittsburgh Penguins	2–3	Chicago Black Hawks	Chicago Stadium	Recap
No scoring		First period	00:35 – Pit Martin (3); 05:52 – J.P. Bordeleau (1)
Jean Pronovost (1) – sh – 10:51		Second period	No scoring
Bobby Leiter (2) – pp – 12:45		Third period	11:17 – Chico Maki (1)
Jim Rutherford 32 saves / 35 shots		Goalie stats	Tony Esposito 26 saves / 28 shots

April 8	Chicago Black Hawks	2–0	Pittsburgh Penguins	Civic Arena	Recap
No scoring		First period	No scoring
J.P. Bordeleau (2) – 05:33		Second period	No scoring
Stan Mikita (1) – 12:41		Third period	No scoring
Gary Smith 31 saves / 31 shots		Goalie stats	Jim Rutherford 38 saves / 40 shots

April 9	Chicago Black Hawks	6–5	OT	Pittsburgh Penguins	Civic Arena	Recap
Jim Pappin (2) – 03:08		First period		No scoring
Bobby Hull (1) – 16:40		Second period		09:13 – Ken Schinkel (1); 14:10 – Syl Apps Jr. (1); 17:19 – Ken Schinkel (2); 19:30 – Ron Schock (1)
Bobby Hull (2) – 01:22; Bobby Hull (3) – 11:28; Dennis Hull (1) – 15:38		Third period		17:52 – Bobby Leiter (3)
Pit Martin (4) – 00:12		First overtime period		No scoring
Gerry Desjardins 29 saves / 34 shots		Goalie stats		Jim Rutherford 26 saves / 32 shots

Chicago won series 4–0

==== (W2) Minnesota North Stars vs. (W3) St. Louis Blues ====
The Minnesota North Stars finished second in the West Division with 86 points. The St. Louis Blues finished third with 67 points. This was the fourth playoff meeting between these two teams with St. Louis winning two of the three previous series. They last met in the previous year's Quarterfinals which the North Stars won in six games. Minnesota won four of the six games in this year's regular season series.

Kevin O'Shea's series-winning goal in overtime of Game 7 was the first time in Stanley Cup Playoff history that the road team won Game 7 in overtime.

April 5	St. Louis Blues	0–3	Minnesota North Stars	Met Center	Recap
No scoring		First period	14:25 – Dean Prentice (1)
No scoring		Second period	No scoring
No scoring		Third period	04:19 – Dean Prentice (2); 12:01 – Bob Nevin (1)
Jacques Caron 41 saves / 44 shots		Goalie stats	Gump Worsley 27 saves / 27 shots

April 6	St. Louis Blues	5–6	OT	Minnesota North Stars	Met Center	Recap
Frank St. Marseille (1) – pp – 12:14		First period		02:51 – pp – Doug Mohns (1)
Frank St. Marseille (2) – 02:00; Frank St. Marseille (3) – 05:38		Second period		04:27 – pp – J. P. Parise (1); 07:38 – Danny Grant (1)
Garry Unger (1) – 08:05; Phil Roberto (1) – 10:59		Third period		01:45 – Jude Drouin (1); 11:32 – Dean Prentice (3)
No scoring		First overtime period		01:36 – Bill Goldsworthy (1)
Ernie Wakely 23 saves / 29 shots		Goalie stats		Cesare Maniago 33 saves / 38 shots

April 8	Minnesota North Stars	1–2	St. Louis Blues	St. Louis Arena	Recap
No scoring		First period	09:28 – Phil Roberto (2)
No scoring		Second period	10:07 – pp – Phil Roberto (3)
Jude Drouin (2) – pp – 00:40		Third period	No scoring
Gump Worsley 33 saves / 35 shots		Goalie stats	Jacques Caron 29 saves / 30 shots

April 9	Minnesota North Stars	2–3	St. Louis Blues	St. Louis Arena	Recap
Jude Drouin (3) – 10:56		First period	No scoring
Danny Grant (2) – 00:21		Second period	12:12 – Phil Roberto (4); 13:45 – Kevin O'Shea (1)
No scoring		Third period	11:50 – pp – Barclay Plager (1)
Cesare Maniago 35 saves / 38 shots		Goalie stats	Jacques Caron 28 saves / 30 shots

April 11	St. Louis Blues	3–4	Minnesota North Stars	Met Center	Recap
Gary Sabourin (1) – 16:34; Phil Roberto (5) – pp – 19:59		First period	01:42 – Barry Gibbs (1); 17:55 – Tom Reid (1)
Garry Unger (2) – pp – 19:34		Second period	No scoring
No scoring		Third period	02:55 – pp – J. P. Parise (2); 05:45 – Jude Drouin (4)
Jacques Caron 23 saves / 27 shots		Goalie stats	Gump Worsley 30 saves / 33 shots

April 13	Minnesota North Stars	2–4	St. Louis Blues	St. Louis Arena	Recap
Bill Goldsworthy (2) – 04:03		First period	03:04 – pp – Phil Roberto (6); 06:21 – Bob Plager (1)
No scoring		Second period	11:07 – Garry Unger (3)
J. P. Parise (3) – 15:01		Third period	16:13 – Jack Egers (1)
Gump Worsley 11 saves / 13 shots Cesare Maniago 23 saves / 25 shots		Goalie stats	Jacques Caron 28 saves / 30 shots

April 16	St. Louis Blues	2–1	OT	Minnesota North Stars	Met Center	Recap
Gary Sabourin (2) – 12:04		First period		No scoring
No scoring		Second period		No scoring
No scoring		Third period		00:15 – Charlie Burns (1)
Kevin O'Shea (2) – 10:07		First overtime period		No scoring
Jacques Caron 28 saves / 29 shots		Goalie stats		Cesare Maniago 25 saves / 27 shots

St. Louis won series 4–3

=== Semifinals ===
==== (E1) Boston Bruins vs. (W3) St. Louis Blues ====
This was the second playoff meeting between these two teams. Their only previous series came in the 1970 Stanley Cup Finals which Boston won in four games. Boston won this year's six-game regular season series earning nine of twelve points.

April 18	St. Louis Blues	1–6	Boston Bruins	Boston Garden	Recap
Garry Unger (4) – pp – 03:18		First period	04:22 – Fred Stanfield (4); 11:03 – Mike Walton (2); 17:27 – Johnny Bucyk (3)
No scoring		Second period	10:48 – pp – Fred Stanfield (5); 19:32 – Fred Stanfield (6)
No scoring		Third period	14:55 – pp – Phil Esposito (5)
Jacques Caron 21 saves / 26 shots Ernie Wakely 17 saves / 18 shots		Goalie stats	Eddie Johnston 25 saves / 26 shots

April 20	St. Louis Blues	2–10	Boston Bruins	Boston Garden	Recap
No scoring		First period	07:17 – pp – Johnny Bucyk (4); 08:39 – Phil Esposito (6); 09:54 – Ed Westfall (2)
No scoring		Second period	06:33 – Garnet Bailey (1); 09:27 – pp – John McKenzie (3)
Mike Murphy (1) – 04:37; Phil Roberto (7) – 05:26		Third period	03:47 – pp – Johnny Bucyk (5); 10:34 – Mike Walton (3); 14:29 – Don Marcotte (2); 16:07 – Johnny Bucyk (6); 16:47 – Ed Westfall (3)
Jacques Caron 9 saves / 13 shots Ernie Wakely 12 saves / 18 shots		Goalie stats	Gerry Cheevers 31 saves / 33 shots

April 23	Boston Bruins	7–2	St. Louis Blues	St. Louis Arena	Recap
Ed Westfall (4) – sh – 08:40; John McKenzie (4) – pp – 10:36; Phil Esposito (7) – 19:42		First period	02:05 – pp – Mike Murphy (2)
Mike Walton (4) – 02:58; Ken Hodge (4) – 06:28; John McKenzie (5) – pp – 11:12		Second period	No scoring
Mike Walton (5) – 11:09		Third period	18:15 – Gary Sabourin (3)
Eddie Johnston 27 saves / 29 shots		Goalie stats	Peter McDuffe 31 saves / 38 shots

April 25	Boston Bruins	5–3	St. Louis Blues	St. Louis Arena	Recap
Phil Esposito (8) – 01:29; Johnny Bucyk (7) – pp – 09:27		First period	18:16 – Terry Crisp (1)
Johnny Bucyk (8) – pp – 04:44; Phil Esposito (9) – pp – 17:53		Second period	No scoring
Wayne Cashman (1) – 19:22		Third period	08:50 – Andre Dupont (1); 15:25 – Chris Evans (1)
Gerry Cheevers 33 saves / 36 shots		Goalie stats	Jacques Caron 22 saves / 26 shots

Boston won series 4–0

==== (W1) Chicago Black Hawks vs. (E2) New York Rangers ====
This was the fourth playoff meeting between these two teams with Chicago winning all three previous series. They last met in the previous year's Semifinals which the Black Hawks won in seven games. New York won this year's six-game regular season series earning seven of twelve points.

April 16	New York Rangers	3–2	Chicago Black Hawks	Chicago Stadium	Recap
Ted Irvine (3) – 12:51		First period	No scoring
Brad Park (1) – 16:07; Walt Tkaczuk (3) – 16:42		Second period	No scoring
No scoring		Third period	12:30 – Stan Mikita (2); 14:40 – J. P. Bordeleau (3)
Ed Giacomin 25 saves / 27 shots		Goalie stats	Tony Esposito 25 saves / 28 shots

April 18	New York Rangers	5–3	Chicago Black Hawks	Chicago Stadium	Recap
Vic Hadfield (5) – 14:38		First period	09:46 – Dennis Hull (2)
No scoring		Second period	14:15 – Stan Mikita (3)
Rod Gilbert (1) – pp – 00:54; Brad Park (2) – 08:15; Rod Gilbert (2) – 12:36; Pete Stemkowski (2) – 19:51		Third period	06:17 – pp – Pat Stapleton (1)
Gilles Villemure 32 saves / 35 shots		Goalie stats	Tony Esposito 27 saves / 31 shots

April 20	Chicago Black Hawks	2–3	New York Rangers	Madison Square Garden	Recap
Dennis Hull (3) – 05:12		First period	17:31 – Pete Stemkowski (3)
Dennis Hull (4) – pp – 09:49		Second period	06:20 – sh – Bruce MacGregor (1); 10:56 – Dale Rolfe (2)
No scoring		Third period	No scoring
Gary Smith 36 saves / 39 shots		Goalie stats	Gilles Villemure 21 saves / 23 shots

April 23	Chicago Black Hawks	2–6	New York Rangers	Madison Square Garden	Recap
Bobby Hull (4) – sh – 05:37		First period	05:49 – pp – Phil Goyette (1); 15:32 – Bobby Rousseau (3)
Pat Stapleton (2) – pp – 12:10		Second period	04:37 – pp – Rod Gilbert (3); 16:25 – Vic Hadfield (6); 18:22 – Gene Carr (1)
No scoring		Third period	03:40 – Bobby Rousseau (4)
Tony Esposito 31 saves / 37 shots		Goalie stats	Gilles Villemure 23 saves / 25 shots

New York won series 4–0

=== Stanley Cup Finals ===
This was the eighth series between these two teams with Boston winning five of the seven previous series. They last met in the 1970 Stanley Cup Quarterfinals which the Bruins won in six games. The Bruins made their twelfth appearance in the Finals; they most recently made the Finals in 1970 where they defeated the St. Louis Blues in four games. This was the New York Rangers eighth Finals appearance and first since 1950 where they lost to the Detroit Red Wings in seven games. Boston won five of the six games in this year's regular season series.

April 30	New York Rangers	5–6	Boston Bruins	Boston Garden	Recap
Dale Rolfe (3) – 03:52		First period	05:07 – Fred Stanfield (7); 15:48 – Ken Hodge (5); 17:29 – sh – Derek Sanderson (1); 18:14 – sh – Ken Hodge (6)
Rod Gilbert (4) – pp – 11:54		Second period	10:46 – Ken Hodge (7)
Vic Hadfield (7) – pp – 01:56; Walt Tkaczuk (4) – 07:48; Bruce MacGregor (2) – 09:17		Third period	17:44 – Garnet Bailey (2)
Eddie Giacomin 22 saves / 28 shots		Goalie stats	Gerry Cheevers 24 saves / 29 shots

May 2	New York Rangers	1–2	Boston Bruins	Boston Garden	Recap
No scoring		First period	16:15 – pp – Johnny Bucyk (9)
Rod Gilbert (5) – 07:23		Second period	No scoring
No scoring		Third period	11:53 – pp – Ken Hodge (8)
Gilles Villemure 23 saves / 25 shots		Goalie stats	Eddie Johnston 27 saves / 28 shots

May 4	Boston Bruins	2–5	New York Rangers	Madison Square Garden	Recap
Mike Walton (6) – 14:04		First period	01:22 – pp – Brad Park (3); 11:19 – pp – Rod Gilbert (6); 13:00 – pp – Brad Park (4)
Bobby Orr (2) – 01:10		Second period	03:46 – Rod Gilbert (7); 19:23 – Pete Stemkowski (4)
No scoring		Third period	No scoring
Gerry Cheevers 34 saves / 39 shots		Goalie stats	Eddie Giacomin 32 saves / 34 shots

May 7	Boston Bruins	3–2	New York Rangers	Madison Square Garden	Recap
Bobby Orr (3) – 05:26; Bobby Orr (4) – pp – 08:17		First period	No scoring
Don Marcotte (3) – sh – 16:33		Second period	18:38 – Ted Irvine (4)
No scoring		Third period	18:35 – pp – Rod Seiling (1)
Eddie Johnston 21 saves / 23 shots		Goalie stats	Eddie Giacomin 21 saves / 24 shots

May 9	New York Rangers	3–2	Boston Bruins	Boston Garden	Recap
Dale Rolfe (4) – 13:45		First period	03:55 – Wayne Cashman (2); 16:07 – pp – Ken Hodge (9)
No scoring		Second period	No scoring
Bobby Rousseau (5) – 02:56; Bobby Rousseau (6) – 12:45		Third period	No scoring
Gilles Villemure 36 saves / 38 shots		Goalie stats	Eddie Johnston 23 saves / 26 shots

May 11	Boston Bruins	3–0	New York Rangers	Madison Square Garden	Recap
Bobby Orr (5) – pp – 11:18		First period	No scoring
No scoring		Second period	No scoring
Wayne Cashman (3) – pp – 05:10; Wayne Cashman (4) – 18:11		Third period	No scoring
Gerry Cheevers 33 saves / 33 shots		Goalie stats	Gilles Villemure 24 saves / 27 shots

Boston won series 4–2

== Awards ==
1972 NHL awards
Prince of Wales Trophy: (East Division champion, regular season)	Boston Bruins
Clarence S. Campbell Bowl: (West Division champion, regular season)	Chicago Black Hawks
Art Ross Trophy: (Top scorer, regular season)	Phil Esposito, Boston Bruins
Bill Masterton Memorial Trophy: (Perseverance, sportsmanship, and dedication)	Bobby Clarke, Philadelphia Flyers
Calder Memorial Trophy: (Top first-year player)	Ken Dryden, Montreal Canadiens
Conn Smythe Trophy: (Most valuable player, playoffs)	Bobby Orr, Boston Bruins
Hart Memorial Trophy: (Most valuable player, regular season)	Bobby Orr, Boston Bruins
James Norris Memorial Trophy: (Best defenceman)	Bobby Orr, Boston Bruins
Lady Byng Memorial Trophy: (Excellence and sportsmanship)	Jean Ratelle, New York Rangers
Lester B. Pearson Award: (Outstanding player, regular season)	Jean Ratelle, New York Rangers
Vezina Trophy: (Goaltender(s) of team with best goaltending record)	Tony Esposito & Gary Smith, Chicago Black Hawks

=== All-Star teams ===
First Team	Position	Second Team
Tony Esposito, Chicago Black Hawks	G	Ken Dryden, Montreal Canadiens
Bobby Orr, Boston Bruins	D	Bill White, Chicago Black Hawks
Brad Park, New York Rangers	D	Pat Stapleton, Chicago Black Hawks
Phil Esposito, Boston Bruins	C	Jean Ratelle, New York Rangers
Rod Gilbert, New York Rangers	RW	Yvan Cournoyer, Montreal Canadiens
Bobby Hull, Chicago Black Hawks	LW	Vic Hadfield, New York Rangers

== Player statistics ==
=== Scoring leaders ===
Player	Team	GP	G	A	Pts	PIM
Phil Esposito	Boston Bruins	76	66	67	133	76
Bobby Orr	Boston Bruins	76	37	80	117	106
Jean Ratelle	New York Rangers	63	46	63	109	4
Vic Hadfield	New York Rangers	78	50	56	106	142
Rod Gilbert	New York Rangers	73	43	54	97	64
Frank Mahovlich	Montreal Canadiens	76	43	53	96	36
Bobby Hull	Chicago Black Hawks	78	50	43	93	24
Yvan Cournoyer	Montreal Canadiens	73	47	36	83	15
Johnny Bucyk	Boston Bruins	78	32	51	83	4
Bobby Clarke	Philadelphia Flyers	78	35	46	81	87
Jacques Lemaire	Montreal Canadiens	77	32	49	81	26

Source: NHL.

=== Leading goaltenders ===
Note: GP = Games played; Min = Minutes played; GA = Goals against; GAA = Goals against average; W = Wins; L = Losses; T = Ties; SO = Shutouts

Player	Team	GP	MIN	GA	GAA	W	L	T	SO
Tony Esposito	Chicago Black Hawks	48	2780	82	1.77	31	10	6	9
Gilles Villemure	New York Rangers	37	2129	74	2.09	24	7	4	3
Gump Worsley	Minnesota North Stars	34	1923	68	2.12	16	10	7	2
Ken Dryden	Montreal Canadiens	64	3800	142	2.24	39	8	15	8
Gary Smith	Chicago Black Hawks	28	1540	62	2.42	14	5	6	5
Gerry Cheevers	Boston Bruins	41	2420	101	2.50	27	5	8	2
Jacques Caron	St. Louis Blues	28	1619	68	2.52	14	8	5	1
Bernie Parent	Toronto Maple Leafs	47	2715	116	2.56	17	18	9	3
Jacques Plante	Toronto Maple Leafs	34	1965	86	2.63	16	13	5	2
Cesare Maniago	Minnesota North Stars	43	2539	112	2.65	20	17	4	3

=== Other statistics ===
- Plus/Minus leader: Bobby Orr, Boston Bruins

== Coaches ==
=== East ===
- Boston Bruins: Tom Johnson
- Buffalo Sabres: George "Punch" Imlach and Joe Crozier
- Detroit Red Wings: Johnny Wilson
- Montreal Canadiens: Scotty Bowman
- New York Rangers: Emile Francis
- Toronto Maple Leafs: John McLellan
- Vancouver Canucks: Hal Laycoe

=== West ===
- California Golden Seals: Vic Stasiuk
- Chicago Black Hawks: Billy Reay
- Los Angeles Kings: Fred Glover
- Minnesota North Stars: Jack Gordon
- Philadelphia Flyers: Fred Shero
- Pittsburgh Penguins: Red Kelly
- St. Louis Blues: Sid Abel, Bill McCreary Sr. and Al Arbour

== Debuts ==
The following is a list of players of note who played their first NHL game in 1971–72 (listed with their first team, asterisk(*) marks debut in playoffs):

- Terry O'Reilly, Boston Bruins
- Rick Martin, Buffalo Sabres
- Craig Ramsay, Buffalo Sabres
- Marcel Dionne, Detroit Red Wings
- Billy Smith, Los Angeles Kings
- Guy Lafleur, Montreal Canadiens
- Bill Clement, Philadelphia Flyers
- Dave Schultz, Philadelphia Flyers
- Mike Murphy, St. Louis Blues
- Wayne Stephenson, St. Louis Blues
- Rick Kehoe, Toronto Maple Leafs
- Jocelyn Guevremont, Vancouver Canucks
- Dennis Kearns, Vancouver Canucks

== Last games ==
The following is a list of players of note that played their last game in the NHL in 1971–72 listed with their last team:

- John McKenzie, Boston Bruins
- Ted Green, Boston Bruins
- Dick Duff, Buffalo Sabres
- Eric Nesterenko, Chicago Black Hawks
- Ab McDonald, Detroit Red Wings
- Bob Pulford, Los Angeles Kings
- J.C. Tremblay, Montreal Canadiens
- Phil Goyette, New York Rangers
- Val Fonteyne, Pittsburgh Penguins
- Bill Hicke, Pittsburgh Penguins
- Brit Selby, St. Louis Blues
- Don Marshall, Toronto Maple Leafs
- Rosaire Paiement, Vancouver Canucks

NOTE: McKenzie, Green, Tremblay, Fonteyne, Selby, Nesterenko, McDonald, Hicke and Paiement would continue their careers in the World Hockey Association.

== Broadcasting ==
Hockey Night in Canada on CBC Television televised Saturday night regular season games. HNIC also produced Wednesday night regular season game telecasts for CTV. Due to a National Association of Broadcast Employees and Technicians strike that affected the CBC, this season's Stanley Cup playoff games aired instead on CTV.

This was the sixth and final season under the U.S. rights agreement with CBS, airing Sunday afternoon regular season and playoff games. CBS also televised Game 6 of the 1972 Stanley Cup Finals on a Thursday night. NBC then signed a new contract to broadcast games.

== See also ==
- List of Stanley Cup champions
- 1971 NHL amateur draft
- 1971–72 NHL transactions
- 25th National Hockey League All-Star Game
- National Hockey League All-Star Game
- Lester Patrick Trophy
- Ice hockey at the 1972 Winter Olympics
- 1971 in sports
- 1972 in sports
