= Jean Ratelle =

Canadian ice hockey player (born 1940)

- Hockey Hall of Fame, 1985
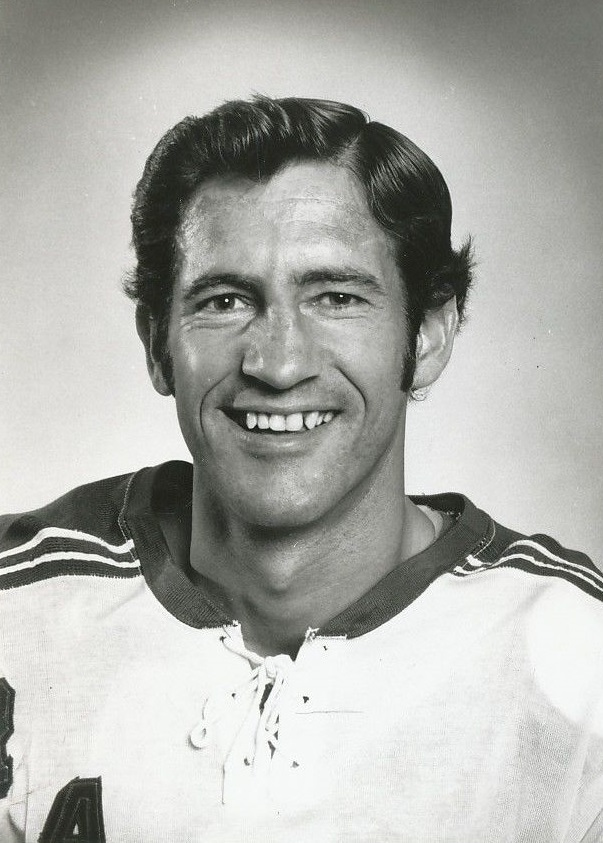
- Ratelle with the New York Rangers in 1972
- Born: October 3, 1940 (age 86) Lac Saint-Jean, Quebec, Canada
- Height: 6 ft 1 in (185 cm)
- Weight: 175 lb (79 kg; 12 st 7 lb)
- Position: Centre
- Shot: Left
- Played for: New York Rangers; Boston Bruins
- National team: Canada
- Playing career: 1960–1981

Joseph Gilbert Yvon Jean Ratelle (born October 3, 1940) is a Canadian former ice hockey player who played for the New York Rangers and Boston Bruins. He featured in three Stanley Cup Finals (1972, 1977, 1978). In twenty-one seasons he averaged almost a point a game and won the Lady Byng Trophy twice in recognition of his great sportsmanship. He was inducted into the Hockey Hall of Fame in 1985.

In 2017 he was named one of the "100 Greatest NHL Players" in history.

== Playing career ==
Ratelle's hockey career almost ended at age 23 when he suffered a serious back injury and had to undergo major spinal cord surgery. He recovered to become a regular with the Rangers from 1963 to 1975. His greatest success came with linemates Vic Hadfield and Rod Gilbert in the "GAG Line" (i.e. Goal-a-Game Line). He led the Rangers in scoring between 1968 and 1973 when the team was a powerhouse among the league's best.

Ratelle was poised to beat out Boston Bruins' legend Phil Esposito for the scoring title in 1972 when he had to sit out fifteen games due to an injury but came back for the Stanley Cup Final against Boston to lead his team. Only three other players - Esposito, Bobby Orr and Johnny Bucyk - had scored as many points in any season as Ratelle had done in his shortened season. His 109 points that season remained a Rangers' scoring record until 2006, when Jaromír Jágr broke it.

In November 1975, Ratelle was traded with Brad Park and Joe Zanussi to the Boston Bruins for Esposito and Carol Vadnais. Rangers general manager Emile Francis made the trade out in part out of respect so that Ratelle did not have to relocate his family far, plus the Bruins had sought Ratelle's skills at center.

With the Bruins for the remainder of the 1975–76 season, Ratelle scored over 100 points that season for the second time in his career. He played five more seasons with Boston, gaining admiration for his slick passing, skill at faceoffs, and all-around excellent play.

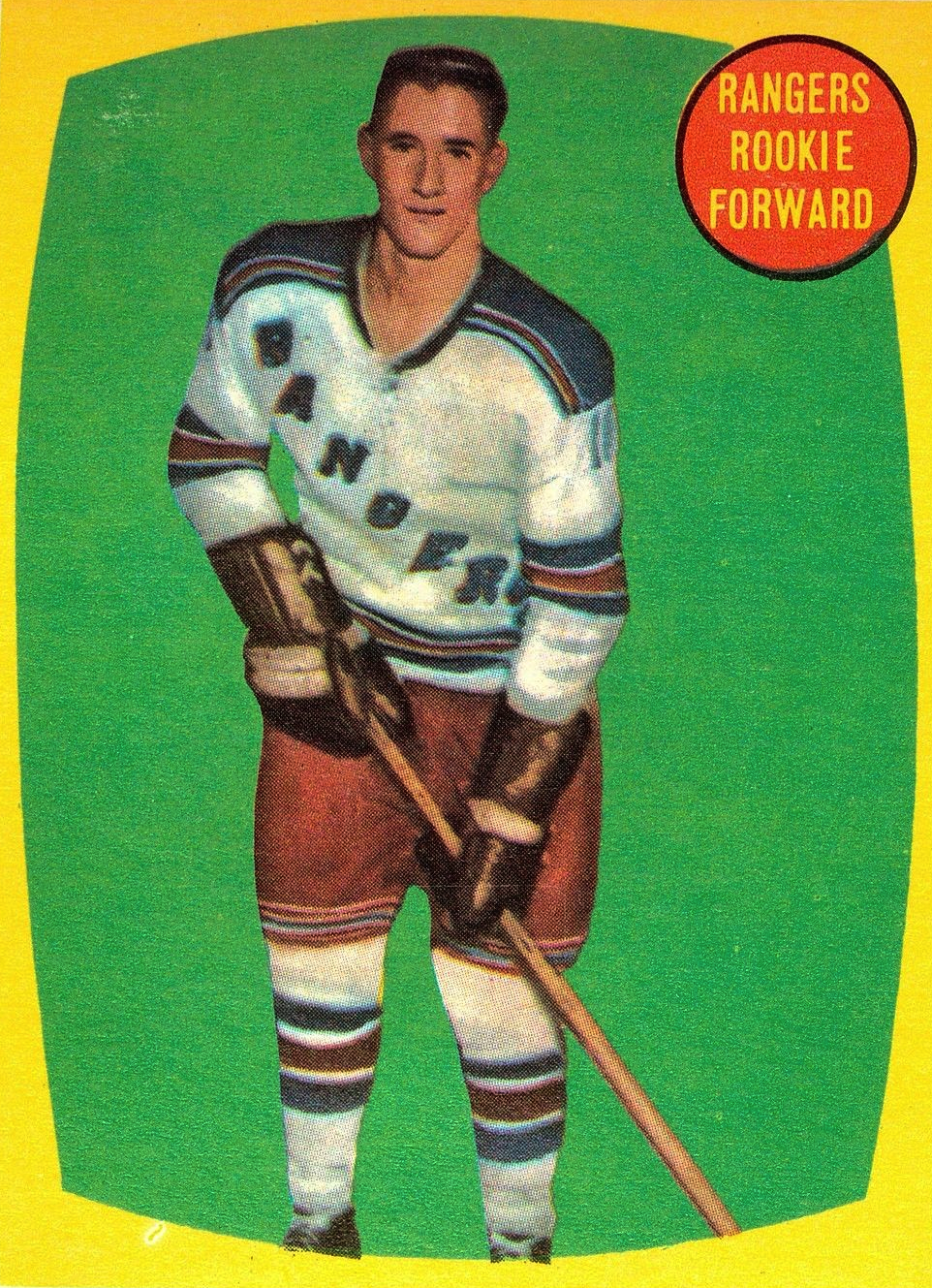
Ratelle's rookie trading card

At the time of his retirement after the 1980–81 season, Ratelle was the league's sixth all-time leading scorer. While he never played on a team that won the Stanley Cup (being a finalist in 1972, 1977, and 1978), he was a member of the 1972 Team Canada squad that defeated the Soviet Union in the first Summit Series. He was well known as a gentlemanly player, finishing in the top five for the Lady Byng Memorial Trophy for sportsmanship and excellence nine times, including a stretch between the 1970 and 1978 seasons where he was in the top three six times and won the trophy twice.

== Post-playing career ==
Ratelle retired as a player after the 1980–81 season and remained in the Bruins organization, serving for four years as an assistant coach and then sixteen years as a scout.

In 1985, Jean Ratelle was inducted into the Hockey Hall of Fame.

In the 2009 book 100 Ranger Greats, the authors ranked Ratelle at No. 7 all-time of the 901 New York Rangers who had played during the team's first 82 seasons.

On August 28, 2017, the Rangers announced that they would retire Ratelle's number 19 jersey on February 25, 2018; this was done in a pre-game ceremony.

In 2023 he would be named one of the top 100 Bruins players of all time.

== Career statistics ==
=== Regular season and playoffs ===
			Regular season					Playoffs
Season	Team	League	GP	G	A	Pts	PIM	GP	G	A	Pts	PIM
1958–59	Guelph Biltmores	OHA	54	20	31	51	11	10	5	4	9	2
1959–60	Guelph Biltmores	OHA	48	39	47	86	15	5	3	5	8	4
1959–60	Trois-Rivières Lions	EPHL	3	3	5	8	0	—	—	—	—	—
1960–61	Guelph Royals	OHA	47	40	61	101	10	14	6	11	17	6
1960–61	New York Rangers	NHL	3	2	1	3	0	—	—	—	—	—
1961–62	New York Rangers	NHL	31	4	8	12	4	—	—	—	—	—
1961–62	Kitchener Beavers	EPHL	32	10	29	39	8	7	2	6	8	2
1962–63	New York Rangers	NHL	47	11	9	20	8	—	—	—	—	—
1962–63	Baltimore Clippers	AHL	20	11	8	19	0	3	0	0	0	0
1963–64	New York Rangers	NHL	15	0	7	7	6	—	—	—	—	—
1963–64	Baltimore Clippers	AHL	57	20	26	46	2	—	—	—	—	—
1964–65	New York Rangers	NHL	54	14	21	35	14	—	—	—	—	—
1964–65	Baltimore Clippers	AHL	8	9	4	13	6	—	—	—	—	—
1965–66	New York Rangers	NHL	67	21	30	51	10	—	—	—	—	—
1966–67	New York Rangers	NHL	41	6	5	11	4	4	0	0	0	2
1967–68	New York Rangers	NHL	74	32	46	78	18	6	0	4	4	2
1968–69	New York Rangers	NHL	75	32	46	78	26	4	1	0	1	0
1969–70	New York Rangers	NHL	75	32	42	74	28	6	1	3	4	0
1970–71	New York Rangers	NHL	78	26	46	72	14	13	2	9	11	8
1971–72	New York Rangers	NHL	63	46	63	109	4	6	0	1	1	0
1972–73	New York Rangers	NHL	78	41	53	94	12	10	2	7	9	0
1973–74	New York Rangers	NHL	68	28	39	67	16	13	2	4	6	0
1974–75	New York Rangers	NHL	79	36	55	91	26	3	1	5	6	5
1975–76	New York Rangers	NHL	13	5	10	15	2	—	—	—	—	—
1975–76	Boston Bruins	NHL	67	31	59	90	16	12	8	8	16	4
1976–77	Boston Bruins	NHL	78	33	61	94	22	14	5	12	17	4
1977–78	Boston Bruins	NHL	80	25	59	84	10	15	3	7	10	0
1978–79	Boston Bruins	NHL	80	27	45	72	12	11	7	6	13	2
1979–80	Boston Bruins	NHL	67	28	45	73	8	3	0	0	0	0
1980–81	Boston Bruins	NHL	47	11	26	37	16	3	0	0	0	0
NHL totals			1,280	491	776	1,267	276	123	32	66	98	24

=== International ===
Year	Team	Event	GP	G	A	Pts	PIM
1972	Canada	SS	6	1	3	4	0

== See also ==
- List of NHL statistical leaders
- List of NHL players with 1,000 games played
- List of NHL players with 1,000 points

Preceded by Pit Martin	Winner of the Bill Masterton Trophy; 1971	Succeeded by Bobby Clarke
Preceded by John Bucyk	Winner of the Lady Byng Trophy; 1972	Succeeded by Gilbert Perreault
Preceded by Marcel Dionne	Winner of the Lady Byng Trophy; 1976	Succeeded by Marcel Dionne
