= 1972–73 Austrian Hockey League season =

Austrian ice hockey season

The 1972–73 Austrian Hockey League season was the 43rd season of the Austrian Hockey League, the top level of ice hockey in Austria. Eight teams participated in the league, and EC KAC won the championship.

== Regular season ==
	Team	GP	W	L	T	GF	GA	Pts
1.	EC KAC	28	21	3	4	178	88	46
2.	ATSE Graz	28	19	5	4	139	66	42
3.	Wiener EV	28	18	10	0	139	94	36
4.	Innsbrucker EV	28	15	9	4	164	110	34
5.	WAT Stadlau	28	11	16	1	100	134	23
6.	HC Salzburg	28	8	18	2	127	156	18
7.	VEU Feldkirch	28	8	18	2	107	162	18
8.	EC Kitzbühel	28	3	24	1	74	217	7
