= Rod Gilbert =

Canadian ice hockey player (1941–2021)

- Hockey Hall of Fame, 1982
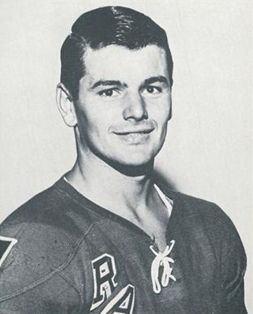
- Gilbert with the New York Rangers in 1964
- Born: July 1, 1941 Montreal, Quebec, Canada
- Died: August 22, 2021 (aged 80) New York City, New York, U.S.
- Height: 5 ft 9 in (175 cm)
- Weight: 175 lb (79 kg; 12 st 7 lb)
- Position: Right wing
- Shot: Right
- Played for: New York Rangers
- National team: Canada
- Playing career: 1960–1978
- Website: www.rodgilbert.com

Rodrigue Gabriel Gilbert (July 1, 1941 – August 22, 2021) was a Canadian professional ice hockey forward who played his entire career for the New York Rangers of the National Hockey League (NHL). Known as "Mr. Ranger", he played right wing on the GAG line (Goal-A-Game line) with Vic Hadfield and Jean Ratelle. He was inducted into the Hockey Hall of Fame in 1982, and was the first player in Rangers history to have his number retired. After his playing career, he became president of the Rangers' alumni association.

== Early life ==
Gilbert was born in Montreal on July 1, 1941, the son of Alma, a homemaker, and Gabriel Gilbert, a blacksmith. He grew up a fan of the Montreal Canadiens. He played three seasons for the Guelph Biltmores of the Ontario Hockey Association from 1957 to 1960. In his final year with the team, Gilbert slipped on some garbage strewn on the ice and fell back into the boards, breaking a vertebra in his back and temporarily paralyzing him. Corrective surgery went awry and led to hemorrhaging in his leg, and doctors feared amputation would be necessary, but Gilbert recovered.

== Playing career ==
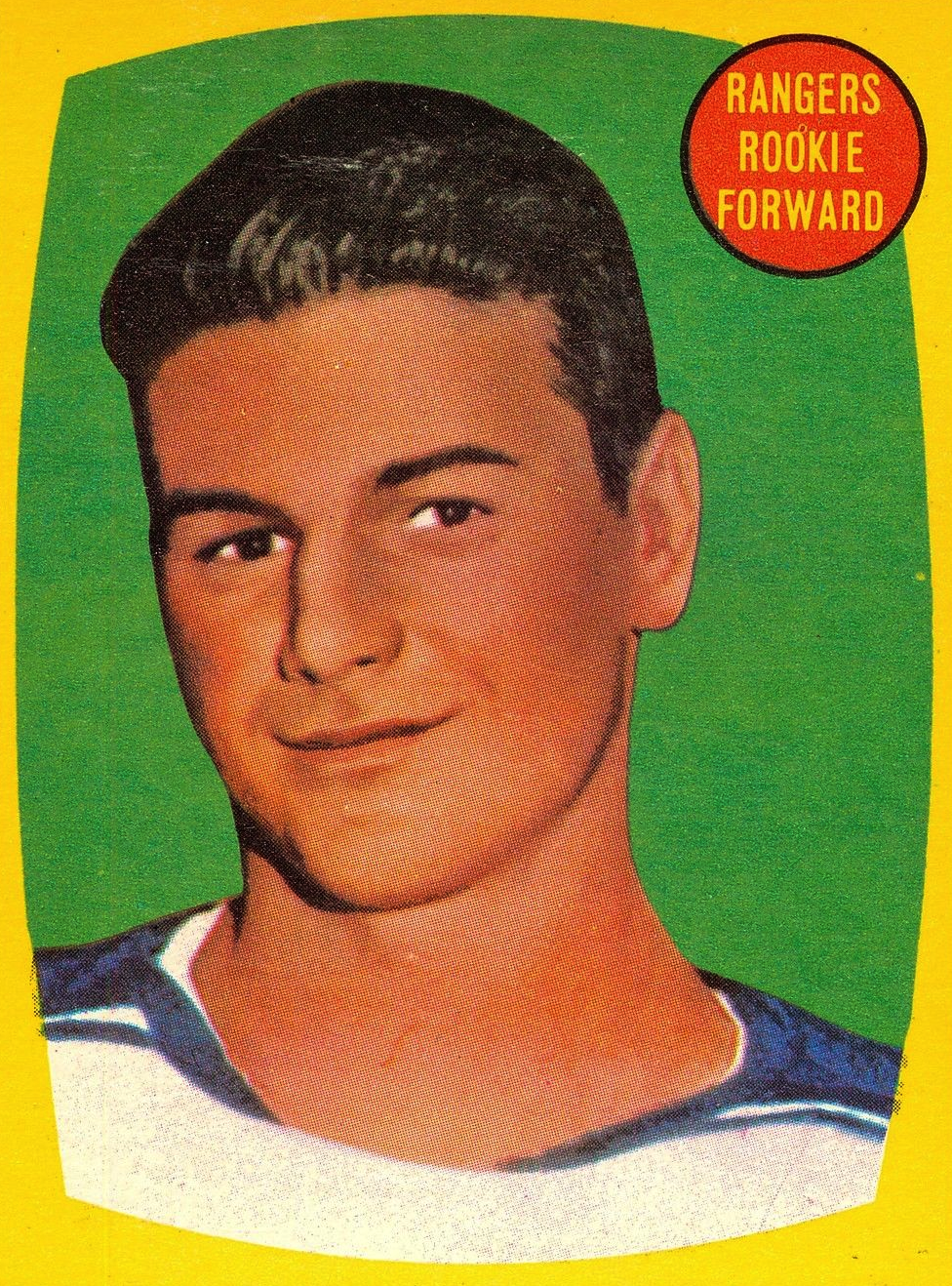
1960 Topps card of Gilbert

After finishing his junior career with the Guelph Royals, Gilbert joined the Rangers near the end of the 1960–61 NHL season. He soon became popular with the Rangers' fans, and he rose in prominence as an NHL star. However, it was not without pain. In 1965–66, his career was nearly derailed when he went through a second spinal fusion operation. This surgery was performed by Dr. Kazuo Yanagisawa. Gilbert was out of action for half a season, but he bounced back in 1966–67 and scored 28 goals. On February 24, 1968, he scored four goals in a game against the Montreal Canadiens. The Ratelle-Hadfield-Gilbert line, called the GAG line, proved formidable for years. He played with Team Canada in the 1972 Summit Series against the Soviet Union. He won the Bill Masterton Trophy in 1976 for his perseverance over his back troubles.

At the beginning of the 1977–78 NHL season, Gilbert and Rangers' General Manager John Ferguson got into a contract dispute. He was released by the Rangers on November 23, 1977, after starting the campaign with two goals and seven assists in 19 games. He would retire after the season, his eighteenth in the NHL. His number 7 was retired by the Rangers on October 14, 1979, the first number to be retired by the team.

== Post-playing career ==
After retiring from professional hockey, he became head coach of the American Hockey League New Haven Nighthawks for the 1980–81 season. Gilbert opened his own restaurant, 'Gilbert's,' on Third Avenue near 75th street in Manhattan. He subsequently worked for Fundamental Brokers on Wall Street, assisting the company in opening a branch in his hometown of Montreal. He returned to the Rangers organization in August 1989. There, he acted as director of special projects and community relations representative, as well as president of its alumni association. From 2017 onward, he made upward of 30 appearances a year on behalf of the Garden of Dreams Foundation, an outreach program that works with children in the community.

== Personal life ==
Gilbert married Judith Christy in 1991, in a ceremony conducted by New York mayor David Dinkins. Combined, they had four children together, Holly, Brooke, Chantal and Justin, and seven grandchildren. Chantal and Justin were children from his first wife, Judith Linton from Crawfordville, Florida. Linton was a stewardess for National Airlines at the time. He was one of ten athletes who were featured in American artist Andy Warhol's 1979 Athlete Series of paintings, which featured prominent sports figures from the 1970s. Others in the series include O. J. Simpson, Chris Evert, and Pelé.

Gilbert died in Manhattan on August 22, 2021. He was 80 years old. At the time of his death, more than 40 years after his career ended, he remained the Rangers’ leading scorer.

== Career statistics ==
=== Regular season and playoffs ===
			Regular season					Playoffs
Season	Team	League	GP	G	A	Pts	PIM	GP	G	A	Pts	PIM
1957–58	Guelph Biltmores	OHA	32	14	16	30	14	—	—	—	—	—
1958–59	Guelph Biltmores	OHA	54	27	34	61	40	10	5	4	9	14
1959–60	Guelph Biltmores	OHA	47	39	52	91	40	5	3	3	6	4
1959–60	Trois-Rivières Lions	EPHL	3	4	6	10	0	5	2	2	4	2
1960–61	Guelph Royals	OHA	47	54	49	103	47	6	4	4	8	6
1960–61	New York Rangers	NHL	1	0	1	1	2	—	—	—	—	—
1961–62	New York Rangers	NHL	1	0	0	0	0	4	2	3	5	4
1961–62	Kitchener-Waterloo Beavers	EPHL	21	12	11	23	22	4	0	0	0	4
1962–63	New York Rangers	NHL	70	11	20	31	20	—	—	—	—	—
1963–64	New York Rangers	NHL	70	24	40	64	62	—	—	—	—	—
1964–65	New York Rangers	NHL	70	25	36	61	54	—	—	—	—	—
1965–66	New York Rangers	NHL	34	10	15	25	20	—	—	—	—	—
1966–67	New York Rangers	NHL	64	28	18	46	12	4	2	2	4	6
1967–68	New York Rangers	NHL	73	29	48	77	12	6	5	0	5	4
1968–69	New York Rangers	NHL	66	28	49	77	22	4	1	0	1	2
1969–70	New York Rangers	NHL	72	16	37	53	22	6	4	5	9	0
1970–71	New York Rangers	NHL	78	30	31	61	65	13	4	6	10	8
1971–72	New York Rangers	NHL	73	43	54	97	64	16	7	8	15	11
1972–73	New York Rangers	NHL	76	25	59	84	25	10	5	1	6	2
1973–74	New York Rangers	NHL	75	36	41	77	20	13	3	5	8	4
1974–75	New York Rangers	NHL	76	36	61	97	22	3	1	3	4	2
1975–76	New York Rangers	NHL	70	36	50	86	32	—	—	—	—	—
1976–77	New York Rangers	NHL	77	27	48	75	50	—	—	—	—	—
1977–78	New York Rangers	NHL	19	2	7	9	6	—	—	—	—	—
NHL totals			1,065	406	615	1,021	510	79	34	33	67	43

=== International ===
Year	Team	Event	GP	G	A	Pts	PIM
1972	Canada	SS	6	1	3	4	9
1977	Canada	WC	9	2	2	4	12
Senior totals			15	3	5	8	21

== Awards and honors ==
- Named to the NHL second All-Star team (1967–68)
- Named to the NHL first All-Star team (1971–72)
- Won Bill Masterton Trophy (1976)
- Won Lester Patrick Trophy (1991)
- Played in NHL All-Star Game (1964, 1965, 1967, 1969, 1970, 1972, 1975, 1977)
- Inducted into Hockey Hall of Fame in 1982
- Has his No. 7 retired at Madison Square Garden, the first Ranger to receive the honor.
- Awarded the Ellis Island Medal of Honor in May 2010, in recognition of his humanitarian efforts.

== Records ==
- New York Rangers team record for career goals (406)
- New York Rangers team record for career points (1021)
- New York Rangers team record for consecutive games with an assist by a forward (10)
- Shares New York Rangers team record for assists in one game (5; three times)

== See also ==
- List of NHL players with 1,000 points
- List of NHL players with 1,000 games played
