= Brad Park =

Canadian ice hockey player (born 1948)

- Hockey Hall of Fame, 1988
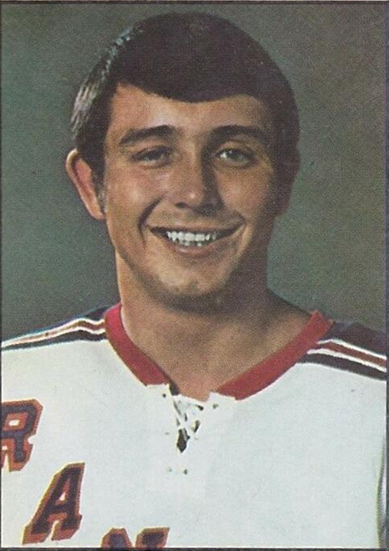
- Park with the New York Rangers in 1972
- Born: July 6, 1948 (age 78) Toronto, Ontario, Canada
- Height: 6 ft 0 in (183 cm)
- Weight: 190 lb (86 kg; 13 st 8 lb)
- Position: Defence
- Shot: Left
- Played for: New York Rangers; Boston Bruins; Detroit Red Wings
- National team: Canada
- NHL draft: 2nd overall, 1966; New York Rangers
- Playing career: 1968–1985

Douglas Bradford Park (born July 6, 1948) is a Canadian former professional ice hockey player. A defenceman, Park played in the National Hockey League (NHL) for the New York Rangers, Boston Bruins and Detroit Red Wings. Considered to be one of the best defencemen of his era, he was named to an All-Star team seven times. The most productive years of Park's career were overshadowed by superstars Bobby Orr -- with whom he played for a brief time -- and Denis Potvin, so Park never won the Norris Trophy as the season's top defenceman. Park was elected to the Hockey Hall of Fame in 1988. In 2017, he was named one of the "100 Greatest NHL Players" in history.

== Early life ==
Born on July 6, 1948, to his dad Bob and his mother Betty, Park grew up in Scarborough, Ontario, with his 4 siblings Ron, Betty Anne, Lori and Shelley. His father was a Scottish immigrant who had served as a sergeant in the Royal Canadian Air Force during World War II, then later became a youth hockey referee and coach. Growing up, Park and his dad would place the salt and pepper shakers on the kitchen table like chessmen in analyzing defensive play.

As a teenager, Park worked as a laborer at a golf course in the Thornhill district of Toronto.

== Playing career ==
As a youth, Park played against older kids, leading to him developing into a strong player. In 1960, he played in the Quebec International Pee-Wee Hockey Tournament with the Scarbororough Lions, winning the tournament. Later, he was a member of the Junior B Toronto Westclairs (1964–1965) and then the Junior A Toronto Marlboros (1965–1968), helping the Marlboros win the 1967 Memorial Cup. He was drafted by the New York Rangers in the first round (second overall) in the 1966 NHL amateur draft and, after a brief stint with the minor-league Buffalo Bisons of the AHL, began playing for the Rangers in 1968.

=== New York Rangers ===
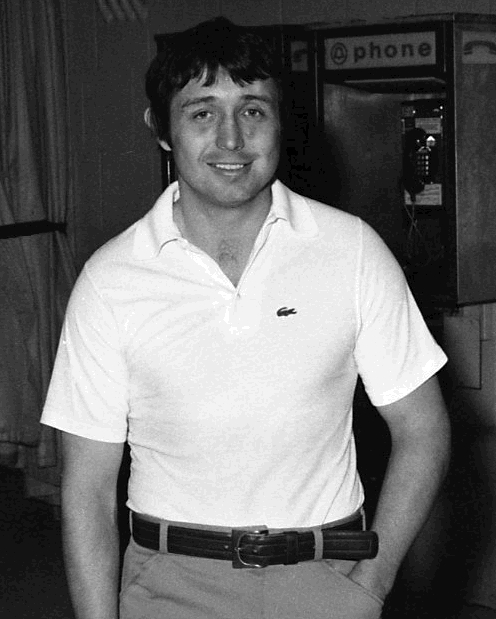
Park in the 1970s

Park developed into the Rangers best defenceman, whose offensive skill, stickhandling and pugnacity made him popular with local fans and media. He drew occasional comparisons with the Boston Bruins superstar Bobby Orr, universally acclaimed to be the greatest at his position in hockey history. Years afterward, Park remarked, "I saw no reason to be upset because I was rated second to Bobby Orr. After all, Orr not only was the top defenceman in the game but he was considered the best player ever to put on a pair of skates. There was nothing insulting about being rated No. 2 to such a super superstar."

Park made an immediate impact for the Rangers after being called up from the Bisons, making his debut during the 1968-69 season. During a game on February 2, 1969 vs. the Pittsburgh Penguins, Park had a record setting night when he became the first Rangers defenseman to get four assists in one game. At the time of the game he was only 20 years, 211 days old, which set a NHL record for youngest defenseman to get four assists in a game. Park finished the year with 3 goals and 23 assists in 54 appearances, and finished third in voting for the Calder Trophy. However, Park and the Rangers were defeated 4-2 in the first round of the playoffs against the Montreal Canadiens.

Park began to show his full potential the following year, as he quickly rose as one of the top defensemen in the league. Appearing in 60 games, he scored 11 goals and 26 assists, leading to him playing in his first All-Star Game, while also being named to the NHL First All-Star Team. He also finished runner-up for the Norris Trophy as the league's top defensemen, losing out to Orr. Park and the Rangers were then defeated by the Bruins in the first round of the playoffs. Park would continue his strong play the following year in 1970-71, scoring 7 goals and 37 assists. He was selected to the Second All-Star Team and once again finished runner-up to Orr for the Norris Trophy. Park and the Rangers defeated Toronto in the first round of the playoffs before losing to the Chicago Black Hawks in the semifinals 4-2.

At the start of the 1971-72 season, Park was named an alternate captain. When the team's top scorer, Jean Ratelle, was lost for the season due to a broken ankle, Park picked up the slack, being nearly a point-per-game player with 73 points in 75 games. His 24 goals tied him with Carol Vadnais for the then-fourth-highest total by a defenseman in NHL history. During a game on December 12, 1971, he became the first defenseman in Rangers history to score a hat trick in a 6-3 victory over Pittsburgh. He scored his second hat trick on February 12, 1972, in another 8-3 victory over Pittsburgh, becoming the first defenseman in NHL history to score two hat tricks in the same season. During the postseason, he led the Rangers past the defending Stanley Cup-champion Montreal Canadiens in the first round and the West Division champion Chicago Black Hawks in the semifinals of the playoffs. The Rangers advanced to the Stanley Cup finals, where they fell to the Boston Bruins in six games. Park finished a distant second to Orr in the Norris Trophy vote for a third consecutive season, and was named to the First All-Star Team for a second time. During the offseason, when the upstart World Hockey Association tried to lure Park away, he briefly became the league's highest-paid player when he signed a contract extension with the Rangers for $200,000 per season.

The following year in 1972-73 Park continued to be a star for the Rangers. Although he only appeared in 52 games due to an injured left knee, he still averaged a point a game in his 52 appearances scoring 10 goals and 43 assists being named to the Second All-Star team. The Rangers defeated Boston in the first round of the postseason but were defeated by Chicago in the semifinals. In the 1972 Summit Series, with Orr unable to play due to injury, Park emerged as a key contributor to Team Canada's series over the Soviets, being named Best Defenceman of the series.

The following year in 1973-74 Park would have his best statistical season, scoring 82 points (25 goals and 57 assists, both Rangers records for a defensemen at the time) in 78 games. This led to him becoming the first defenseman in Rangers history to lead the team in scoring. During the postseason he set another record (since broken) for most points by a Rangers defenseman during the postseason with 12. However the Rangers were defeated by the Philadelphia Flyers in the semifinals. Park was named to the First All-Star Team for a third time and finished as runner up for the Norris a fourth time. During the offseason Park, at the age of 26, was named the youngest Rangers captain ever.

Park once again missed some time during the 1974-75 season with a strained left knee, In 65 appearances he scored 13 goals and 44 assists. He and the Rangers were then eliminated by the Islanders in the first round of the playoffs. After opening the following year during the 1975–76 season with their worst start in ten years, the Rangers unloaded several high-priced veterans. Park, Jean Ratelle, and Joe Zanussi were traded to the Boston Bruins in a November 7 blockbuster deal that also sent Phil Esposito and Carol Vadnais to the Rangers. The New York press and public had felt that Park, 27 at the time, was overweight, overpaid, and over the hill, as he was facing unfavorable comparisons to Denis Potvin. Park left the Rangers as their all-time leading scorer among defensemen with 95 goals, 283 assists, and 378 points. Despite his accomplishments, the Rangers have not retired Park's #2 jersey as of 2026, a fact reflected on by New York media.

=== Boston Bruins ===
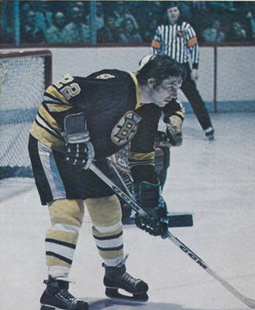
Park with the Boston Bruins in 1979

While Esposito and Vadnais were effective players for the Rangers, the team remained mired at the bottom of the division after the trade, and Rangers general manager Emile Francis was eventually fired. Contrary to expectations that the Rangers had gotten the better end of the trade, the struggling Bruins were instantly rejuvenated and soon again became one of the NHL's best teams, despite the departures of Esposito and Orr.

Taking over the mantle of leadership from Orr, whose career was threatened by injury and who would soon leave the team, Park continued his success under coach Don Cherry. Park had previously been an end-to-end puck carrier, but with the Bruins, he was told by Cherry to concentrate on defense. Getting over his unpopularity in Boston from when he was a member of the arch-rival Rangers, Park made a relatively smooth transition to his new team, even hitch-hiking a ride from two teenagers at 1 am after his car ran out of gas; Park later rewarded them with free tickets to the next Boston home game. Park's exceptional play made it easy for him to win over the fans. The two most dominant defensemen of their era, Park and Orr only shared the ice together for ten games due to Orr's injuries. They played together strictly on the power play and the penalty kill units, with the Bruins going 6-1-3 during that stretch.

Park finished out the 1975-76 season appearing in 56 total games (43 for the Bruins) scoring 18 goals and 41 points for 59 points. However, he missed the final 21 games of the regular season with torn cartilage in his left knee, an injury that required surgery. He did not return until the playoffs. Park and the Bruins made it all the way to the semifinals, but lost to the Flyers 4-1. He was once again named to the First All-Star Team, for a fourth time, and finished runner-up for the Norris for a fifth time. During the 1976-77 season, Park played in 77 games, scoring 12 goals and 55 assists. During the postseason, Park helped the Bruins beat Los Angeles and Philadelphia to reach the 1977 Stanley Cup finals. However, they were defeated by Montreal 4-0.

From 1977 to 1979, Cherry's "Lunch Pail A.C." captured three division titles for the Bruins. The following year, Park had one of his finest seasons, appearing in all 80 games for the first time in his career, and scoring 79 points (22 goals, 57 assists). Park was also part of a historic eleven Bruins players that year who scored 20 or more goals, setting an NHL mark. Park and the Bruins once again made it all the way to the Stanley Cup finals but were again defeated by Montreal 4-2. Park was selected to the First All-Star team for a fifth and final time, and finished runner-up for the Norris for a sixth and final time as well.

Park missed half of 1978-79 season with torn cartilage in his right knee, an injury that required two surgeries. Following his return he averaged nearly a point a game with 7 goals and 32 assists. The Bruins swept Pittsburgh in the first round, then lost to Montreal in the semifinals 4-3. Starting in 1979-80 Park's Bruins career overlapped with the first four years of the emerging superstar defenseman Ray Bourque. That year, Park only appeared in 32 games due to bone spurs in his right knee, an injury that required surgery. Scoring 5 goals and 16 assists. The Bruins then were upset by the New York Islanders in the second round of the postseason.

Park fully returned to action during the 1980-81 season, in which he became only the second defenseman in NHL history (after Orr) and the 23rd overall to reach 500 career assists during a game on December 11, 1980. He was also on the ice for 78 of 87 of the Bruins power-play goals that season. In total, he played in 78 games, scoring 14 goals and 52 assists. He and the Bruins were then swept by Minnesota in the first round of the playoffs. Park played in 76 games during the 1981-82 season, scoring 14 goals and 42 assists as he and the Bruins were eliminated by Quebec in the second round of the playoffs.

Park's last season with the Bruins came in 1982-83. Although still a solid defender, his scoring had declined to 36 points. However, during the postseason he had his last highlight with Boston, in Game 7 of the Adams Division finals against the Buffalo Sabres, when Park scored the game-winning goal in overtime and help Boston advance in to the conference finals. That same year Park would also be awarded the Charlie Conacher Humanitarian Award for his work with the cerebral palsy association of Massachusetts.

Bruins coach Don Cherry had this to say about Park's time with the Bruins stating "Brad was unbelievable for the Bruins, "He played nearly 30 minutes a game. He was tough as nails and could body-check with the best." Also calling Park's point shot a "cannon." Hockey writer Frank Orr commented on Park's time in Boston stating, "He was an excellent defensive defenseman. He killed penalties, he played the power play, he was out in the last minutes of all periods, and he played extremely well." In 2024, Steve McClure described him as "One of the best stick handlers of his era, [he] was a puck-moving artisan, often leaving deked-out forecheckers in the wake of his rink rushes."

Park played in the NHL All-Star Game for nine straight years from 1970 to 1978.

=== Detroit Red Wings ===
The following season (1983–84), Park signed with the Detroit Red Wings as a free agent. Part of the reason Park left Boston for Detroit was that Red Wings owner Mike Ilitch told Park he would grant him ownership of two Little Caesars pizza franchises in the Boston area. He won the Bill Masterton Trophy for perseverance that same year, having set a record for assists by a Red Wings' defenseman (53). He also played his 1,000th NHL game on December 23, 1983, during a game vs. Toronto. After the 1985 season, still an effective player but hobbled by repeated knee injuries, he announced his retirement. The next year, he served as Detroit's head coach before he was fired on June 3, 1986.

Park concluded his career with 213 goals and 896 points in 1,113 regular-season games, holding the second-highest assist total (683) among NHL defensemen at the time of his retirement.

== Retirement and personal life ==
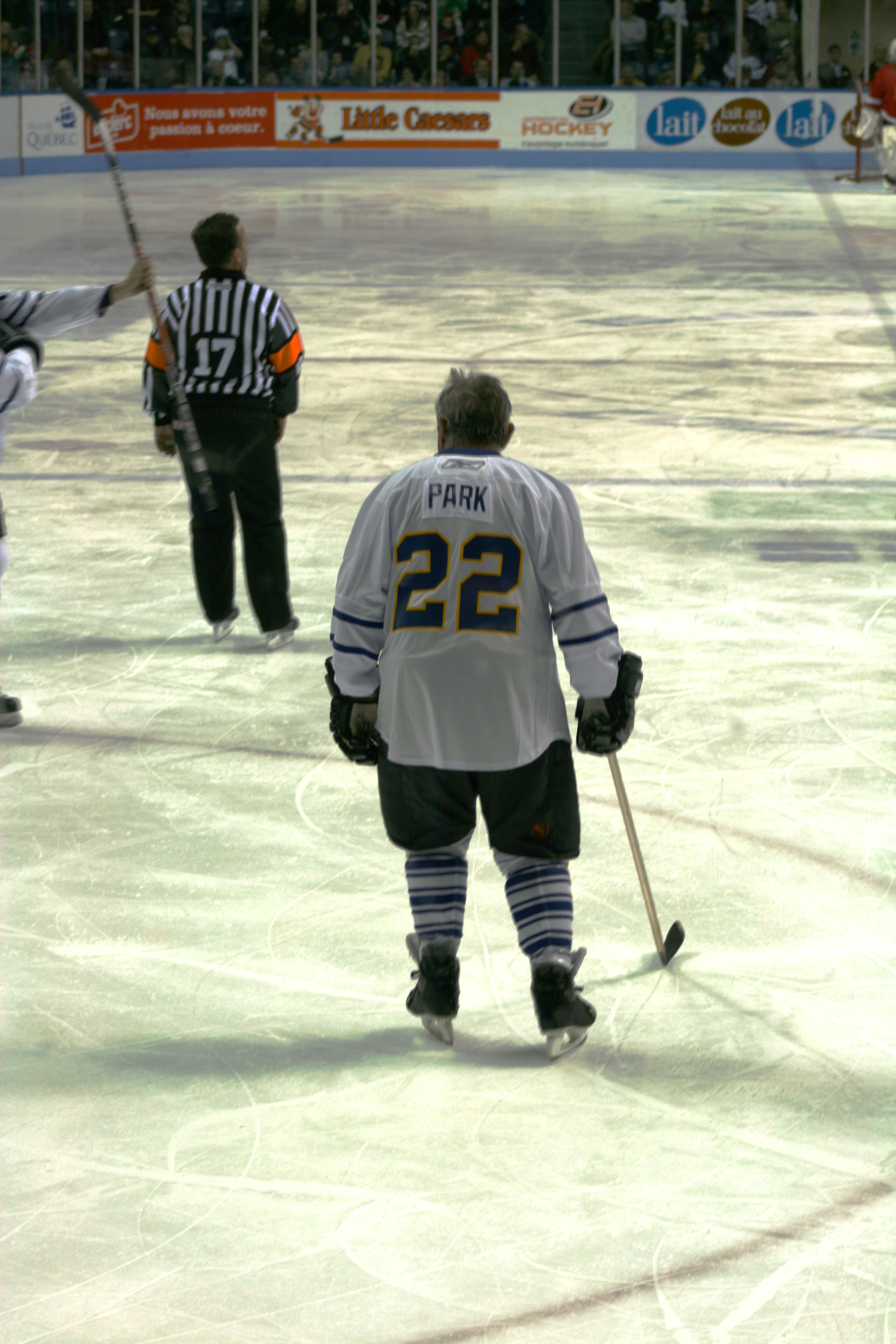
Park playing at the Legends Games for the 50th edition of the Quebec International Pee-Wee Tournament in 2009

In 1971, during his playing days, Park released his first autobiography Play The Man alongside Stan Fischler. The book covers his 1970-1971 season with the Rangers.

Soon after his retirement and before he coached the Red Wings, he served as a color commentator and studio analyst for CTV and ESPN NHL broadcasts in between.

In 1988, Park was elected in his first year of eligibility to the Hockey Hall of Fame in his hometown of Toronto.

Park was one of five plaintiffs along with Dave Forbes, Rick Middleton, Ulf Nilsson and Doug Smail in Forbes v. Eagleson, a class action lawsuit filed in 1995 on behalf of about 1,000 NHL players who were employed by NHL teams between 1972 and 1991 against Alan Eagleson, the league and its member clubs. The players alleged that the NHL and its teams violated the Racketeer Influenced and Corrupt Organizations (RICO) Act by colluding with Eagleson to enable him to embezzle from the National Hockey League Players' Association (NHLPA) and that the four-year statute of limitations in civil racketeering cases began when Eagleson was indicted in 1994. The lawsuit was dismissed on August 27, 1998, in United States District Court for the Eastern District of Pennsylvania by Thomas Newman O'Neill Jr. who ruled that the statute of limitations expired because it had begun in 1991 when the players were made aware of the allegations against Eagleson. O'Neill's decision was upheld in the United States Court of Appeals for the Third Circuit on October 17, 2000.

In 2001, Park returned to the Rangers as a pro scout holding the position until 2004.

Park was later inducted into the Canada sports hall of fame in 2005.

In 2010 Park would lace up his skates more time to play in the Boston Bruins Legends classic at Fenway Park.

In 2012, Park received the NHL Alumni Association's Man of the Year award for his work with former players. He also received the award a second time in 2025, as a member of the 1972 Team Canada that competed in the Summit Series.

Park's name was enshrined on the Canada walk of fame as a member of the 1972 Summit Series team in 2012.

Park has resided on the North Shore of Massachusetts and on Sebago Lake in Maine for 50 years, with his wife Gerry. He has five children and eight grandchildren. His autobiography, Straight Shooter: The Brad Park Story, was published in August 2012. The book is a full insight of Park's life and career while also having additional interviews with players, family members, and key figures from the hockey world.

In 2022, Park was inducted into the Ontario sports Hall of Fame.

In 2024, Park was honored by the sports museum tradition event at the TD Garden, and was given the hockey legacy award.

== Career statistics ==
=== Regular season and playoffs ===
			Regular season					Playoffs
Season	Team	League	GP	G	A	Pts	PIM	GP	G	A	Pts	PIM
1965–66	Toronto Marlboros	OHA	33	0	14	14	48	14	1	0	1	38
1966–67	Toronto Marlboros	OHA	28	4	15	19	73	8	4	3	7	17
1967–68	Toronto Marlboros	OHA	51	10	33	43	120	5	0	6	6	37
1968–69	New York Rangers	NHL	54	3	23	26	70	4	0	2	2	7
1968–69	Buffalo Bisons	AHL	17	2	12	14	49	—	—	—	—	—
1969–70	New York Rangers	NHL	60	11	26	37	98	5	1	2	3	11
1970–71	New York Rangers	NHL	68	7	37	44	114	13	0	4	4	42
1971–72	New York Rangers	NHL	75	24	49	73	130	16	4	7	11	21
1972–73	New York Rangers	NHL	52	10	43	53	51	10	2	5	7	8
1973–74	New York Rangers	NHL	78	25	57	82	148	13	4	8	12	38
1974–75	New York Rangers	NHL	65	13	44	57	104	3	1	4	5	2
1975–76	New York Rangers	NHL	13	2	4	6	23	—	—	—	—	—
1975–76	Boston Bruins	NHL	43	16	37	53	95	11	3	8	11	14
1976–77	Boston Bruins	NHL	77	12	55	67	67	14	2	10	12	4
1977–78	Boston Bruins	NHL	80	22	57	79	79	15	9	11	20	14
1978–79	Boston Bruins	NHL	40	7	32	39	10	11	1	4	5	8
1979–80	Boston Bruins	NHL	32	5	16	21	27	10	3	6	9	4
1980–81	Boston Bruins	NHL	78	14	52	66	111	3	1	3	4	11
1981–82	Boston Bruins	NHL	75	14	42	56	82	11	1	4	5	4
1982–83	Boston Bruins	NHL	76	10	26	36	82	16	3	9	12	18
1983–84	Detroit Red Wings	NHL	80	5	53	58	85	3	0	3	3	0
1984–85	Detroit Red Wings	NHL	67	13	30	43	53	3	0	0	0	11
NHL totals			1,113	213	683	896	1,429	161	35	90	125	217

=== International ===
Year	Team	Event	GP	G	A	Pts	PIM
1972	Canada	SS	8	1	4	5	2
Senior totals			8	1	4	5	2

== Coaching statistics ==
Team	Year	Regular season						Postseason
Team	Year	G	W	L	T	Pts	Finish	Result
Detroit Red Wings	1985–86	45	9	34	2	40	5th in Norris	Missed playoffs

== Honours and achievements ==
- 1960 Quebec International Pee-Wee Hockey Tournament champion
- 1967 Memorial Cup champion
- OHA first All-Star team in 1968
- Named to the first All-Star team in 1970, 1972, 1974, 1976 and 1978
- Named to the second All-Star team in 1971 and 1973
- Runner up in Norris Trophy voting in 1970, 1971, 1972, 1974, 1976 and 1978
- Received both the most First Team All-Star nominations (other than Earl Seibert, who retired before the trophy was awarded) and was runner-up for the Norris more times without winning the Norris than any other defenceman in NHL history
- Played in the NHL All-Star Game in 1970, 1971, 1972, 1973, 1974, 1975, 1976, 1977 and 1978
- Bruins Three Stars Awards: 1977, 1978
- Won the Elizabeth C. Dufresne Trophy in 1978
- Won the Charlie Conacher Humanitarian Award in 1983
- Won the Bill Masterton Memorial Trophy in 1984
- Retired as the leading defence scorer in Rangers' history and the second leading defence scorer in Bruins' history to Bobby Orr
- At the time of his retirement, had played the most seasons in league history for a player never missing the playoffs
- Currently 13th all-time in NHL history in defence scoring
- Elected to the Hockey Hall of Fame in 1988, in his first year of eligibility
- Along with Butch Goring, one of the last two active players who had played in the 1960s
- In 1998, was ranked number 49 on The Hockey News' list of the 100 Greatest Hockey Players
- Inducted into the Canada sports hall of fame in 2005
- In the 2009 book 100 Ranger Greats, was ranked No. 11 all-time of the 901 New York Rangers who had played during the team's first 82 seasons
- In January 2017, Park was part of the first group of players to be named one of the '100 Greatest NHL Players' in history by the National Hockey League.
- Inducted into the Ontario sports Hall of Fame in 2022
- In 2023, was ranked number 53 in The Athletic’s list of the 100 greatest hockey players of all time
- Named one of the Top 100 Best Bruins Players of All Time
- Named to the Boston Bruins All-Centennial Team

== See also ==
- List of members of the Hockey Hall of Fame
- List of NHL players with 1,000 games played

Awards and achievements
Preceded by André Veilleux	New York Rangers first-round draft pick 1966	Succeeded by Bob Dickson
Preceded by Lanny McDonald	Bill Masterton Trophy winner 1984	Succeeded by Anders Hedberg
Sporting positions
Preceded by Vic Hadfield	New York Rangers captain 1974–75	Succeeded by Phil Esposito
Preceded by Harry Neale	Head coach of the Detroit Red Wings; 1985–86	Succeeded by Jacques Demers
Preceded by Mickey Redmond and Gary Dornhoefer	Canadian television color commentator 1984–85; 1985–86	Succeeded by Harry Neale
