= Jim Malone (ice hockey) =

Canadian ice hockey player (born 1962)

- Born: February 20, 1962 (age 64) Chatham, New Brunswick, Canada
- Height: 6 ft 1 in (185 cm)
- Weight: 190 lb (86 kg; 13 st 8 lb)
- Position: Centre
- Played for: Moncton Alpines; Tulsa Oilers; Fredericton Express; Salt Lake Golden Eagles
- NHL draft: 14th overall, 1980; New York Rangers
- Playing career: 1980–1985

James Edward Malone (born February 20, 1962) is a Canadian retired professional ice hockey centre.

== Career ==
Malone was an outstanding junior hockey player with the Toronto Marlboros of the (OMJHL/OHL), racking up 48 points with the Marlboros in his rookie season 1979–80. He was picked in the 1st round, 14th overall, in the 1980 NHL entry draft by the New York Rangers. He continued to play with the Marlboros until 1982. Malone then moved on and played with the Tulsa Oilers of the Central Hockey League (CHL) in 1982–83, where he had 15 points in 29 games. In December 1982, Malone suffered a knee injury. Malone came back from the injury to play with the Moncton Alpines of the American Hockey League (AHL) for the rest of the 1982–83 season. He returned to the Tulsa Oilers for the 1983–84 season and went on to win the league's playoff title that year. Malone later played with the Salt Lake Golden Eagles of the International Hockey League (IHL) and the Fredericton Express of the AHL for the 1984–85 season. It was after the 84–85 season that Malone's knee injury forced him to end his career.

== Championships ==
He won the 1983-84 CHL Championship (Adams Cup) as a member of the Tulsa Oilers team coached by Tom Webster.

== Family ==
Jim Malone is the younger brother of former NHL player and current Tampa Bay Lightning scout Greg Malone, as well as the uncle to former NHL player Ryan Malone (Greg's son). His son Brad Malone was a 4th round pick of the Colorado Avalanche in 2007, and currently plays for the AHL Bakersfield Condors, in the Edmonton Oilers organization.

== Career statistics ==
			Regular season					Playoffs
Season	Team	League	GP	G	A	Pts	PIM	GP	G	A	Pts	PIM
1979–80	Toronto Marlboros	OMJHL	67	24	24	48	68	—	—	—	—	—
1980–81	Toronto Marlboros	OHL	57	11	41	52	174	—	—	—	—	—
1981–82	Toronto Marlboros	OHL	53	24	28	52	127	10	4	5	9	34
1982–83	Moncton Alpines	AHL	10	3	2	5	10	—	—	—	—	—
1982–83	Tulsa Oilers	CHL	29	5	10	15	45	—	—	—	—	—
1983–84	Tulsa Oilers	CHL	57	16	11	27	58	7	1	1	2	0
1984–85	Fredericton Express	AHL	10	0	2	2	9	—	—	—	—	—
1984–85	Salt Lake Golden Eagles	IHL	40	4	13	17	39	—	—	—	—	—
AHL totals			20	3	4	7	19	—	—	—	—	—
CHL totals			86	21	21	42	103	7	1	1	2	0
IHL totals			40	4	13	17	39	—	—	—	—	—

Preceded by Doug Sulliman	New York Rangers first-round draft pick 1980	Succeeded by James Patrick
