= Brad Malone =

Canadian ice hockey player (born 1989)

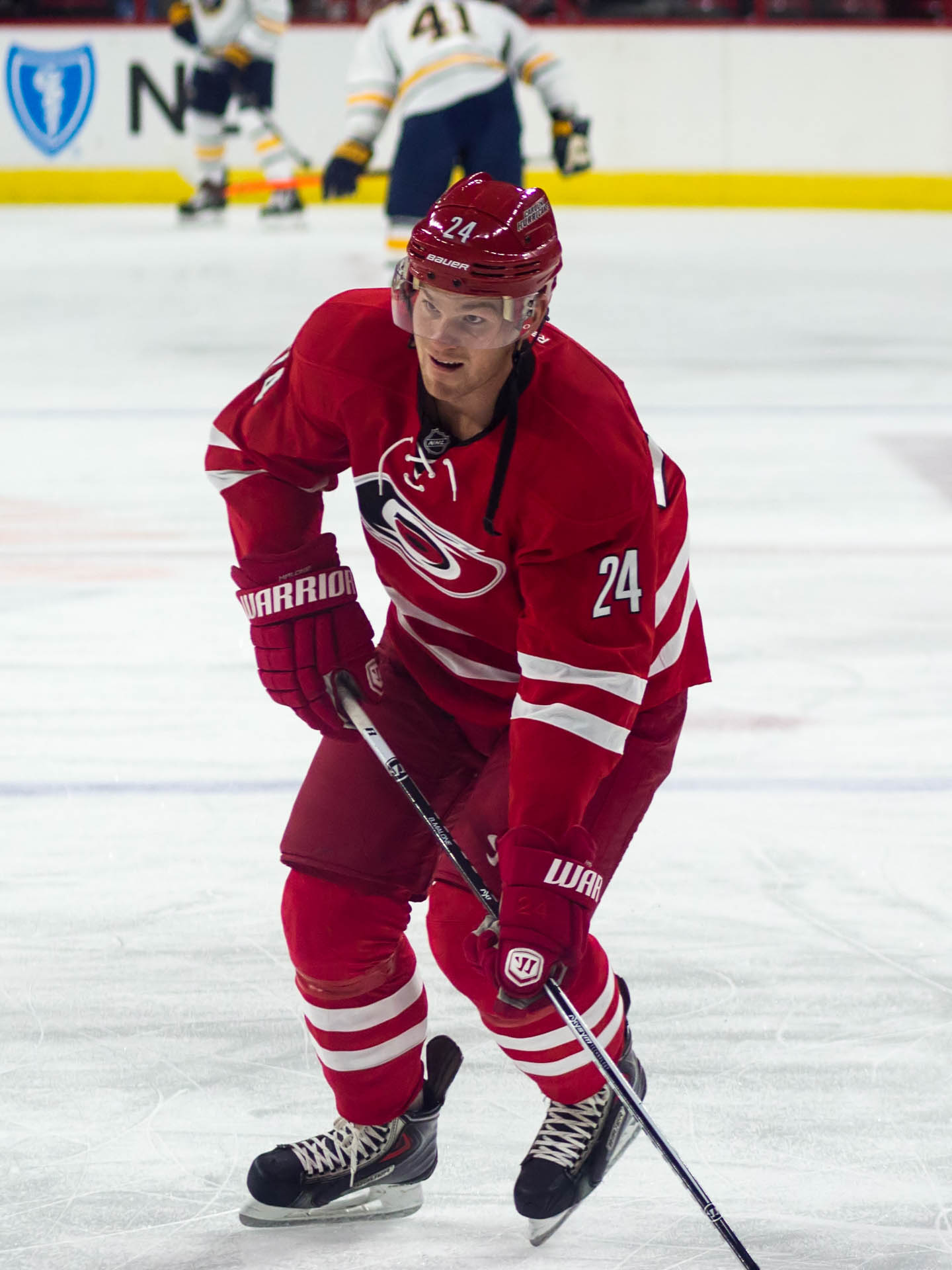
- Malone with the Carolina Hurricanes in 2014
- Born: May 20, 1989 (age 37) Chatham, New Brunswick, Canada
- Height: 6 ft 2 in (188 cm)
- Weight: 217 lb (98 kg; 15 st 7 lb)
- Position: Left wing
- Shot: Left
- Played for: Colorado Avalanche; Carolina Hurricanes; Edmonton Oilers
- NHL draft: 105th overall, 2007; Colorado Avalanche
- Playing career: 2011–2024

Bradley Malone (born May 20, 1989) is a Canadian former professional ice hockey forward. He played with the Colorado Avalanche, with whom he was drafted, the Carolina Hurricanes and Edmonton Oilers in the National Hockey League (NHL). He is currently an assistant coach with the AHL's Wilkes-Barre/Scranton Penguins.

== Playing career ==
Malone was born in Chatham, New Brunswick, where he played hockey as a youth. Malone left home at age 15 to begin his hockey career at Cushing Academy, a small prep school located in Ashburnham, Massachusetts. At 17 Malone joined the USHL and played with the Sioux Falls Stampede, scoring 33 points in 57 games, after which he was drafted 105th overall by the Colorado Avalanche in the 2007 NHL entry draft. Malone then attended the University of North Dakota, where he had 85 points in his 4 years in the WCHA. In completing his collegiate career, Malone was signed by the Avalanche to a two-year entry-level contract on April 12, 2011. Malone's entry into pro hockey immediately began in the 2010–11 season when he was then signed to an amateur try-out with the Lake Erie Monsters of the American Hockey League during their playoff run. Malone had 1 point in 3 games.

After attending his first Avalanche training camp he was reassigned and returned to AHL affiliate, Lake Erie, for the beginning of the 2011–12 season. Malone established himself within the Monsters in a physical checking role on the third line. In contributing offensively with 13 points in 24 games, Malone was recalled by the Avalanche upon a suspension to depth Avalanche forward Kevin Porter. Malone made his NHL debut with the Avalanche the following day on December 9, 2011, in a 4-1 defeat against the Edmonton Oilers. He recorded his first NHL point, an assist, in his fifth career game in a 3-2 shoot-out victory over the Philadelphia Flyers on December 19, before playing his first professional game against his cousin Ryan Malone and the Tampa Bay Lightning on Christmas Eve. Malone contributed with 2 assists in 9 games before he was returned to Lake Erie for the duration of the year to finish second on the team and first as a rookie in scoring with 36 points in 67 games.

In attaining free agent status from the Avalanche, due to a lack of NHL games from his entry-level contract, Malone signed a two-year contract with the Carolina Hurricanes on July 1, 2014. In the 2014–15 season, completed his fourth NHL season and first with the Hurricanes, he established career highs with goals (7), assists (8), points (15) and games played (65). He recorded a team-high 74 penalty minutes, including six fighting majors, the most on the team while leading the team with 162 hits. He was selected as the club's winner of the Josef Vasicek Award for cooperation with the local media by the Carolina chapter of the Professional Hockey Writers' Association

In the 2015–16 season, Malone played in 57 games, recording two goals and six assists for eights points. Malone for a second consecutive year led the Hurricanes in penalty minutes, which included 9 fighting majors, placing second amongst the club with 142 hits.

At the conclusion of his contract with the Hurricanes, Malone left as a free agent and signed a one-year, two-way deal with the Washington Capitals on July 2, 2016. After attending the Capitals 2016 training camp, Malone failed to make the club's opening night roster and was waived and reassigned to begin the 2016–17 season in the AHL with the Hershey Bears. Used in multiple roles in the Bears lineup, Malone responded offensively with 20 points in 52 games before he was included by the Capitals to the St. Louis Blues in a package deal in exchange for Kevin Shattenkirk and Pheonix Copley on February 27, 2017.

Having left the Blues as a free agent, Malone signed a two-year, two-way contract with the Edmonton Oilers on July 3, 2017.

In the final year of his contract with the Oilers in the 2019–20 season, Malone was in the midst of his best AHL season, posting 31 points in 49 games before the season was abruptly ended due to COVID-19. On April 29, 2020, Malone agreed to remain with the Condors, agreeing to a two-year AHL contract to begin the following season.

On February 10, 2022, the Oilers signed Malone to a one-year two-way contract. He made his season debut with the Oilers on March 1 against the Philadelphia Flyers. On March 9, Malone scored his first goal since 2015 in a matchup against the Washington Capitals. He registered a goal and an assist for his first points for the Edmonton Oilers.

On April 18, 2024, Malone announced he would retire following the 2024 Calder Cup playoffs.

On October 13, 2024, the Eastern Ontario Senior Hockey League announced that he had joined the Ganonoque Islanders for the 2024-25 season.

== Personal life ==
Brad comes from a long line of hockey players. His father, Jim Malone, was a first round pick of the New York Rangers. His uncle, Greg Malone, played 12 seasons in the NHL. Brad's first cousin, Ryan Malone, played over 600 games in the NHL, and his younger brother, Brett Malone, played 3 seasons in the QMJHL with the Moncton Wildcats, Cape Breton Screaming Eagles and the Saint John Sea Dogs and 2 seasons with the Miramichi Timberwolves of the MHL. Brad's cousin, Cole Huckins, was drafted 77th overall to Calgary Flames in 2021 NHL entry draft. Brad is married to Bryelle Muller, daughter of former NHL player and former Montreal Canadiens associate coach Kirk Muller.

== Career statistics ==
=== Regular season and playoffs ===
			Regular season					Playoffs
Season	Team	League	GP	G	A	Pts	PIM	GP	G	A	Pts	PIM
2005–06	Cushing Academy	HS-MA	29	9	34	43	24	—	—	—	—	—
2006–07	Sioux Falls Stampede	USHL	57	14	19	33	134	8	3	1	4	24
2007–08	University of North Dakota	WCHA	34	1	2	3	44	—	—	—	—	—
2008–09	University of North Dakota	WCHA	41	5	12	17	75	—	—	—	—	—
2009–10	University of North Dakota	WCHA	43	11	14	25	102	—	—	—	—	—
2010–11	University of North Dakota	WCHA	43	16	24	40	108	—	—	—	—	—
2010–11	Lake Erie Monsters	AHL	—	—	—	—	—	3	0	1	1	2
2011–12	Lake Erie Monsters	AHL	67	11	25	36	89	—	—	—	—	—
2011–12	Colorado Avalanche	NHL	9	0	2	2	0	—	—	—	—	—
2012–13	Lake Erie Monsters	AHL	63	10	14	24	99	—	—	—	—	—
2012–13	Colorado Avalanche	NHL	13	1	1	2	16	—	—	—	—	—
2013–14	Lake Erie Monsters	AHL	35	8	7	15	75	—	—	—	—	—
2013–14	Colorado Avalanche	NHL	32	3	2	5	23	6	0	0	0	2
2014–15	Carolina Hurricanes	NHL	65	7	8	15	74	—	—	—	—	—
2015–16	Carolina Hurricanes	NHL	57	2	4	6	75	—	—	—	—	—
2016–17	Hershey Bears	AHL	52	7	13	20	66	—	—	—	—	—
2016–17	Chicago Wolves	AHL	19	4	4	8	6	—	—	—	—	—
2017–18	Bakersfield Condors	AHL	56	13	20	33	49	—	—	—	—	—
2017–18	Edmonton Oilers	NHL	7	0	0	0	6	—	—	—	—	—
2018–19	Bakersfield Condors	AHL	43	8	17	25	45	10	5	8	13	16
2018–19	Edmonton Oilers	NHL	16	0	0	0	4	—	—	—	—	—
2019–20	Bakersfield Condors	AHL	49	13	18	31	88	—	—	—	—	—
2020–21	Bakersfield Condors	AHL	26	10	11	21	35	6	2	1	3	4
2021–22	Bakersfield Condors	AHL	52	14	25	39	65	5	2	2	4	4
2021–22	Edmonton Oilers	NHL	8	1	1	2	2	2	0	0	0	12
2022–23	Edmonton Oilers	NHL	10	0	0	0	6	—	—	—	—	—
2022–23	Bakersfield Condors	AHL	41	4	17	21	40	2	0	0	0	2
2023–24	Bakersfield Condors	AHL	49	3	15	18	89	2	0	1	1	4
NHL totals			217	14	18	32	206	8	0	0	0	14

=== International ===
Year	Team	Event	Result	GP	G	A	Pts	PIM
2006	Canada Atlantic	U17	6th	5	4	1	5	36
Junior totals				5	4	1	5	36

== Awards and honours ==
Award	Year
USHL
Clark Cup	2007
College
WHCA All-Academic Team	2011
