= Greg Malone (ice hockey) =

Canadian ice hockey player

- Born: March 8, 1956 (age 70) Chatham, New Brunswick, Canada
- Height: 6 ft 0 in (183 cm)
- Weight: 190 lb (86 kg; 13 st 8 lb)
- Position: Centre
- Shot: Left
- Played for: Pittsburgh Penguins; Hartford Whalers; Quebec Nordiques
- NHL draft: 19th overall, 1976; Pittsburgh Penguins
- WHA draft: 76th overall, 1976; Indianapolis Racers
- Playing career: 1976–1987

William Gregory Malone (born March 8, 1956) is a Canadian former professional ice hockey centre and former scout for the Pittsburgh Penguins, Phoenix Coyotes, and Tampa Bay Lightning.

== Career ==
Malone was a scoring star in Fredericton, New Brunswick, before moving on to the Oshawa Generals of the OHA. After recording consecutive 30-goal seasons, the Pittsburgh Penguins selected him in the second round, 19th overall in the 1976 NHL entry draft. He went on to spend the majority of his career with the Penguins, followed by three productive years with the Hartford Whalers. Malone was traded from Hartford to the Quebec Nordiques for Wayne Babych but never produced with his new team and retired in 1987. During his career, Malone scored a total of 501 points (191 goals and 310 assists) in 704 career games.

A year after his retirement, the general manager Tony Esposito hired Malone to the Penguins' scouting staff. He won two Stanley Cups with the Penguins in 1991 and 1992 when he was serving as the head scout for the team. Malone was the chief scout for the Penguins until the offseason in 2006, when he became a scout with the Phoenix Coyotes.

Malone currently coaches youth hockey at the Baierl Ice Complex in Warrendale, Pennsylvania.

== Personal life ==
Malone's younger brother Jim Malone was a first-round pick of the New York Rangers. He is the father of former Pittsburgh Penguins and Tampa Bay Lightning forward Ryan Malone and uncle of Carolina Hurricanes forward Brad Malone. He is also the uncle of the MJAHL's Miramichi Timberwolves current captain Brett Malone.

== Career statistics ==
=== Regular season and playoffs ===
			Regular season					Playoffs
Season	Team	League	GP	G	A	Pts	PIM	GP	G	A	Pts	PIM
1971–72	Fredericton Black Kats	CAHS	21	26	21	47	28	4	6	7	13	4
1972–73	Fredericton Black Kats	CAHS	23	35	41	76	79	8	17	10	27	37
1973–74	Oshawa Generals	OHA	62	11	45	56	63	—	—	—	—	—
1974–75	Oshawa Generals	OHA	68	37	41	78	86	—	—	—	—	—
1975–76	Oshawa Generals	OHA	61	36	36	72	75	—	—	—	—	—
1976–77	Pittsburgh Penguins	NHL	66	18	19	37	43	3	1	1	2	2
1977–78	Pittsburgh Penguins	NHL	78	18	43	61	80	—	—	—	—	—
1978–79	Pittsburgh Penguins	NHL	80	35	30	65	52	7	0	1	1	10
1979–80	Pittsburgh Penguins	NHL	51	19	32	51	46	—	—	—	—	—
1980–81	Pittsburgh Penguins	NHL	62	21	29	50	68	5	2	3	5	16
1981–82	Pittsburgh Penguins	NHL	78	15	24	39	125	3	0	0	0	4
1982–83	Pittsburgh Penguins	NHL	80	17	44	61	82	—	—	—	—	—
1983–84	Hartford Whalers	NHL	78	17	37	54	56	—	—	—	—	—
1984–85	Hartford Whalers	NHL	76	22	39	61	67	—	—	—	—	—
1985–86	Hartford Whalers	NHL	22	6	7	13	24	—	—	—	—	—
1985–86	Quebec Nordiques	NHL	27	3	5	8	18	1	0	0	0	0
1986–87	Fredericton Express	AHL	49	13	22	35	50	—	—	—	—	—
1986–87	Quebec Nordiques	NHL	6	0	1	1	0	1	0	0	0	0
NHL totals			704	191	310	501	661	20	3	5	8	32
