= Emile Francis Award =

Emile Francis Award is an award established by the New York Rangers ice hockey club in 2008 which is given to supporters of youth hockey. It is named after the former Rangers coach and general manager Emile Francis.
