= Doug Sulliman =

Canadian ice hockey player

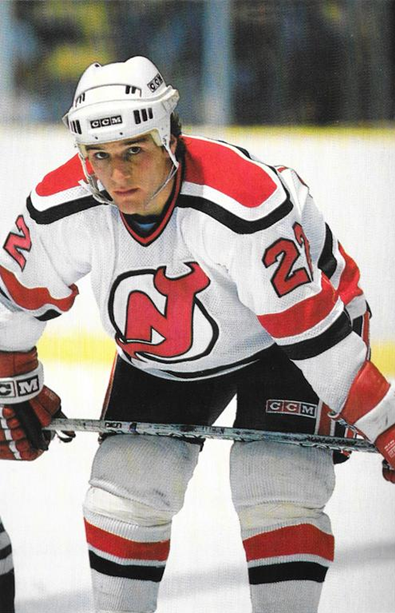
- Born: August 29, 1959 (age 66) Glace Bay, Nova Scotia, Canada
- Height: 6 ft 2 in (188 cm)
- Weight: 209 lb (95 kg; 14 st 13 lb)
- Position: Right wing
- Shot: Left
- Played for: New York Rangers; Hartford Whalers; New Jersey Devils; Philadelphia Flyers
- NHL draft: 13th overall, 1979; New York Rangers
- Playing career: 1979–1990

Simon Douglas Sulliman (born August 29, 1959) is a Canadian former professional ice hockey player. He played 11 seasons in the National Hockey League from 1979–80 until 1989–90.

== Playing career ==
Sulliman was drafted 13th overall by the New York Rangers in the 1979 NHL entry draft, after a standout junior career with the Kitchener Rangers. He played 631 career NHL games, scoring 160 goals and 168 assists for 328 points.

In 1981–82, Sulliman enjoyed a career year for the Hartford Whalers, establishing career highs in goals (29), assists (40), points (69), PIM (39) and games played (77). Following the 1986–87 season, he received several team awards from the New Jersey Devils, including the Players’ MVP, Fan Club MVP, Good Guy Award, and was the team's Masterton Trophy nominee, awarded to the player who best exemplifies "perseverance, sportsmanship, and dedication" to hockey. He also won the team's Three Star award in 1984–85. Notably, he logged his only hat trick on January 22, 1987 for the Devils against the Calgary Flames at Brendan Byrne Arena in a game where a massive snowstorm meant that only 334 attended the game, making it the lowest-attended game in league history.

== Coaching career ==
Upon retirement, Sulliman served as an assistant coach with the Devils from 1990 to 1993, including one season as an assistant under Herb Brooks during the 1992–93 season. During Sulliman's tenure as a coach with the Devils, the team posted a regular-season record of 110-101-33 and qualified for the playoffs each year.

After coaching for the Devils, Sulliman spent the next decade and a half working on Wall Street and in the insurance industry. He also worked with Mike Emrick from 1995 to 1996 as a broadcast analyst with the New Jersey Devils. On July 10, 2008, the Phoenix Coyotes announced that Sulliman had been hired as an assistant coach on head coach Wayne Gretzky's staff.

== Career statistics ==
			Regular season					Playoffs
Season	Team	League	GP	G	A	Pts	PIM	GP	G	A	Pts	PIM
1975–76	Glace Bay Metros	NSAHA	35	44	53	97	42	—	—	—	—	—
1976–77	Kitchener Rangers	OMJHL	65	30	41	71	123	3	0	2	2	2
1977–78	Kitchener Rangers	OMJHL	68	50	39	89	87	9	5	7	12	24
1978–79	Kitchener Rangers	OMJHL	68	38	77	115	88	10	5	7	12	7
1979–80	New York Rangers	NHL	31	4	7	11	2	—	—	—	—	—
1979–80	New Haven Nighthawks	AHL	31	9	7	16	9	—	—	—	—	—
1980–81	New York Rangers	NHL	32	4	1	5	32	3	1	0	1	0
1980–81	New Haven Nighthawks	AHL	45	10	16	26	18	1	0	0	0	0
1981–82	Hartford Whalers	NHL	77	29	40	69	39	—	—	—	—	—
1982–83	Hartford Whalers	NHL	77	22	19	41	14	—	—	—	—	—
1983–84	Hartford Whalers	NHL	67	6	13	19	20	—	—	—	—	—
1984–85	New Jersey Devils	NHL	57	22	16	38	4	—	—	—	—	—
1985–86	New Jersey Devils	NHL	73	21	22	43	20	—	—	—	—	—
1986–87	New Jersey Devils	NHL	78	27	26	53	14	—	—	—	—	—
1987–88	New Jersey Devils	NHL	59	16	14	30	22	9	0	3	3	2
1988–89	Philadelphia Flyers	NHL	52	6	6	12	8	4	0	0	0	0
1989–90	Philadelphia Flyers	NHL	28	3	4	7	0	—	—	—	—	—
NHL totals			631	160	168	328	175	16	1	3	4	2

Preceded by Ron Duguay	New York Rangers first-round draft pick 1979	Succeeded by Jim Malone
