= Ryan Malone =

American ice hockey player (born 1979)

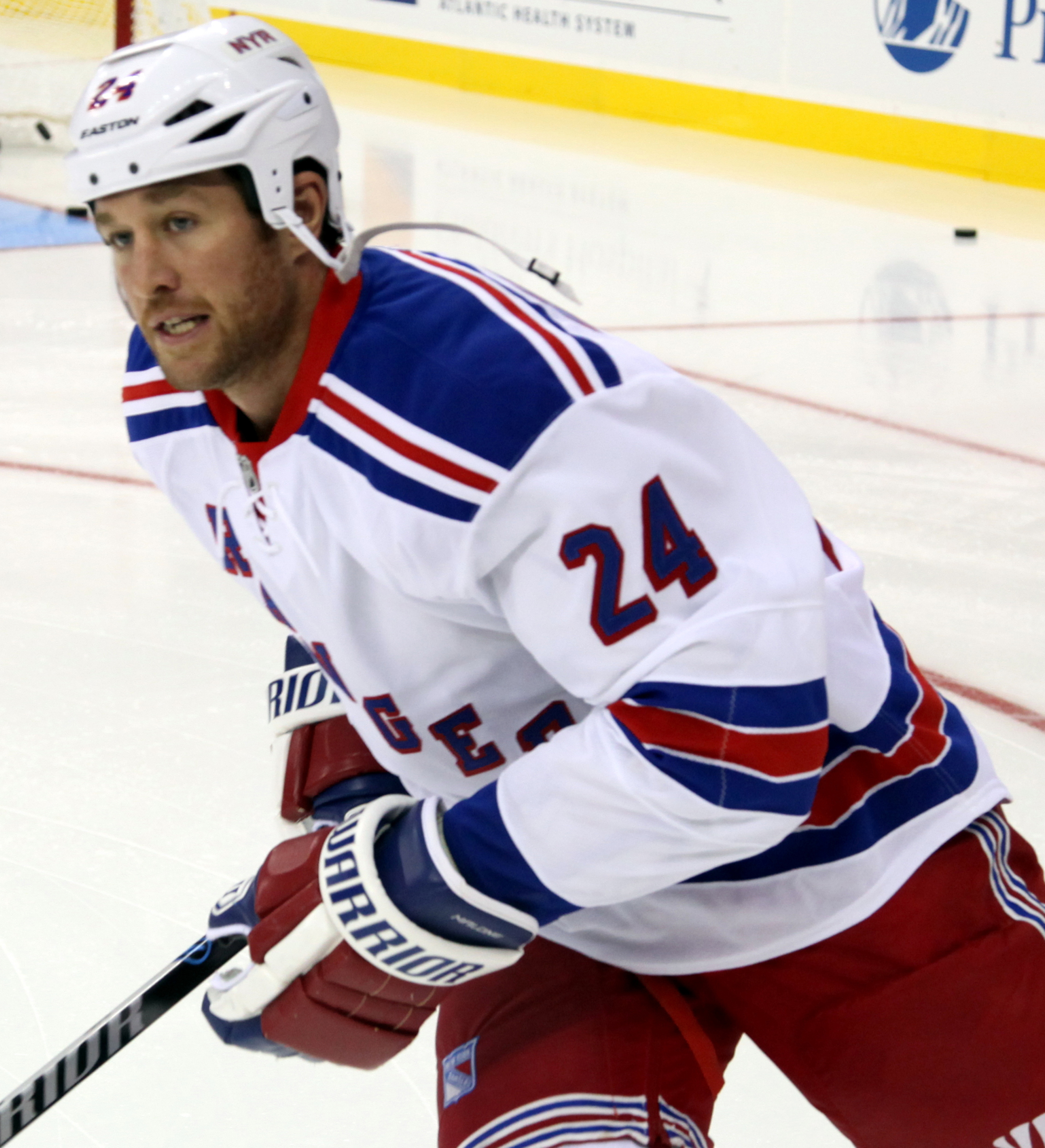
- Malone with the New York Rangers in October 2014
- Born: December 1, 1979 (age 46) Pittsburgh, Pennsylvania, U.S.
- Height: 6 ft 4 in (193 cm)
- Weight: 219 lb (99 kg; 15 st 9 lb)
- Position: Left wing
- Shot: Left
- Played for: Pittsburgh Penguins; Tampa Bay Lightning; New York Rangers
- National team: United States
- NHL draft: 115th overall, 1999; Pittsburgh Penguins
- Playing career: 2003–2018/2022

Ryan Gregory Malone (born December 1, 1979), nicknamed "Bugsy", is an American former professional ice hockey forward. He played in the National Hockey League (NHL) with the Pittsburgh Penguins, Tampa Bay Lightning and New York Rangers. In 2003, he became the first Pittsburgh-born and trained player to suit up for the Penguins in an NHL game.

== Playing career ==
=== Pittsburgh Penguins ===
Malone was drafted in the fourth round, 115th overall, by his hometown team, the Pittsburgh Penguins in the 1999 NHL entry draft.

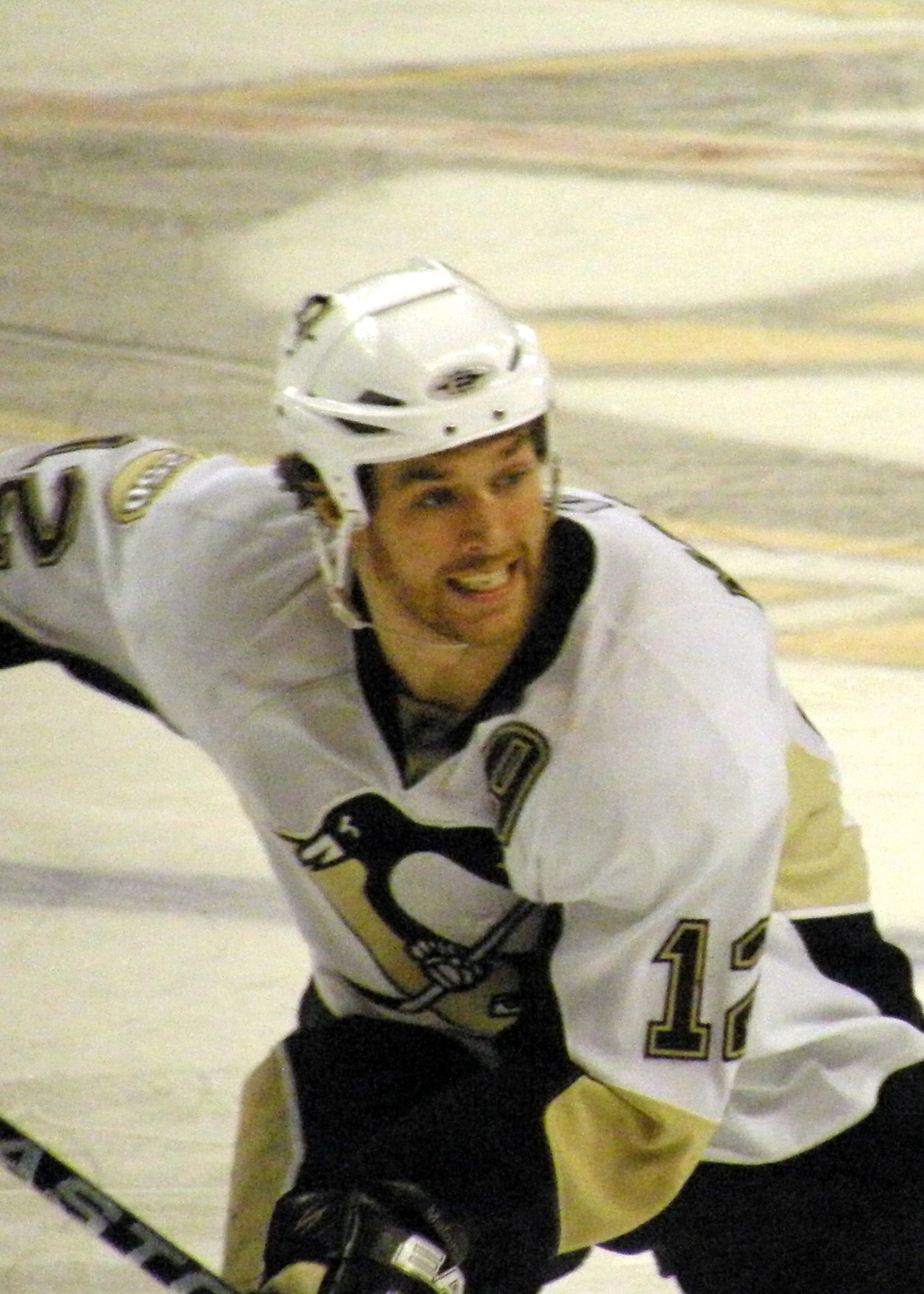
Malone in January 2008 as a member of the Penguins

Malone was born near Pittsburgh, where he attended Upper St. Clair High School in suburban Pittsburgh for two years. He played hockey during his junior year at Shattuck-St. Mary's in Faribault, Minnesota, a school later attended by Zach Parise and Sidney Crosby. During his senior year, Malone played with the Omaha Lancers of the United States Hockey League (USHL) and attended Millard North High School.

Malone was drafted shortly after graduating high school, and went on to play at St. Cloud State University for four seasons. Malone played three games of the 2002–03 with the American Hockey League (AHL)'s Wilkes-Barre/Scranton Penguins after his last season at St. Cloud State. He played 81 games of his rookie season with the Pittsburgh Penguins during the 2003–04 season. Malone finished third on the team in scoring behind Dick Tärnström and Aleksey Morozov. He did not play with the Penguins again until the 2005–06 season, spending time during the 2004–05 lockout in Finland, Italy and Switzerland.

Playing on a line with Sidney Crosby and Mark Recchi during the 2006–07 season, Malone notched his first four-point NHL game on December 13, 2006, against the Philadelphia Flyers. Two days later, he scored his first NHL hat-trick, against the New York Islanders. With this feat, Malone and his father (Greg Malone) became only the second father-son duo in NHL history to score hat-tricks for the same team, along with Ken Hodge, Sr. and Ken Hodge, Jr.

Malone achieved another career oddity against the Islanders on February 19, 2007, when he recorded his second career hat-trick by scoring a goal in the first minute of all three periods.

In January 2008, Malone and defenceman Darryl Sydor were named as alternate captains for the Penguins, following the departure of Mark Recchi and a long-term injury to Gary Roberts.

In Game 1 of the 2008 Stanley Cup Finals, Niklas Kronwall checked Malone and broke his nose. In Game 5, Malone took a Hal Gill slapshot in the face, opening a gash on his cheek and damaging his nose again. He returned for the rest of the game.

=== Tampa Bay Lightning ===
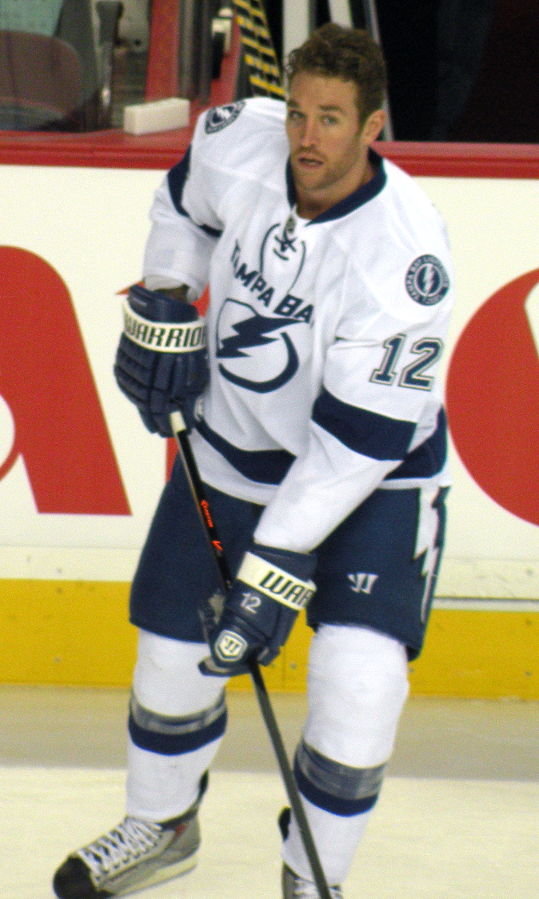
Malone in January 2014 as a member of the Lightning

On June 28, 2008, the Tampa Bay Lightning acquired exclusive negotiation rights with Malone and Gary Roberts from the Penguins in exchange for a third-round pick in the 2009 NHL entry draft. One day later, the Lightning signed Malone to a seven-year, $31.5 million contract that paid him $6 million for the first season. Roberts signed a one-year contract the next day.

On January 1, 2010, Malone was named to the United States Olympic ice hockey team, and went on to win a silver medal at the 2010 Winter Olympics.

On April 11, 2014, Malone was arrested for DUI and cocaine possession in Tampa, Florida. The arrest occurred with one game left in the regular season.

On June 25, 2014, the Tampa Bay Lightning exercised their final compliance buyout to buy out the final year of Malone's contract, making him an unrestricted free agent. While a free agent, Malone told his agent not to field any free agent offers from the Philadelphia Flyers, out of respect to the Penguins organization due to their rivalry with the Flyers.

On August 18, 2014, Malone pleaded no contest to the charges stemming from his arrest in April.

=== New York Rangers ===
On September 11, 2014, the New York Rangers announced they had signed Malone to a one-year, two-way contract worth $700,000. On November 2, 2014, the Rangers placed Malone on waivers. Due to an injury to Mats Zuccarello, the Rangers were able to avoid an emergency call-up and use Malone for another game. The Rangers had 30 days before Malone must be placed on waivers again. On November 10, 2014, Malone was officially assigned to the Rangers' AHL affiliate, the Hartford Wolf Pack. In six games with the Rangers, Malone recorded six shots on goal and was credited with 14 hits.

On February 3, 2015, after Malone told the Rangers he was no longer interested in playing professionally, the Rangers placed Malone on waivers for the purpose of terminating his contract. He cleared waivers on February 4 and his contract was terminated, making him a free agent.

=== Return to ice hockey ===
On August 31, 2017, Malone attempted a comeback to professional ice hockey after signing a professional try-out (PTO) contract with the Minnesota Wild to attend their training camp. He last played professionally during the 2014–15 season, but opted to return with hope of making the U.S. Olympic team for the 2018 Winter Olympics. After a successful camp with the Wild, Malone was released from his PTO and joined the Wild's AHL affiliate, the Iowa Wild, on a PTO to begin the 2017–18 season on October 5, 2017. He played in 12 games with Iowa, collecting 2 assists, before he was released after missing selection to the U.S. Olympic team on December 21, 2017.

== Personal life ==
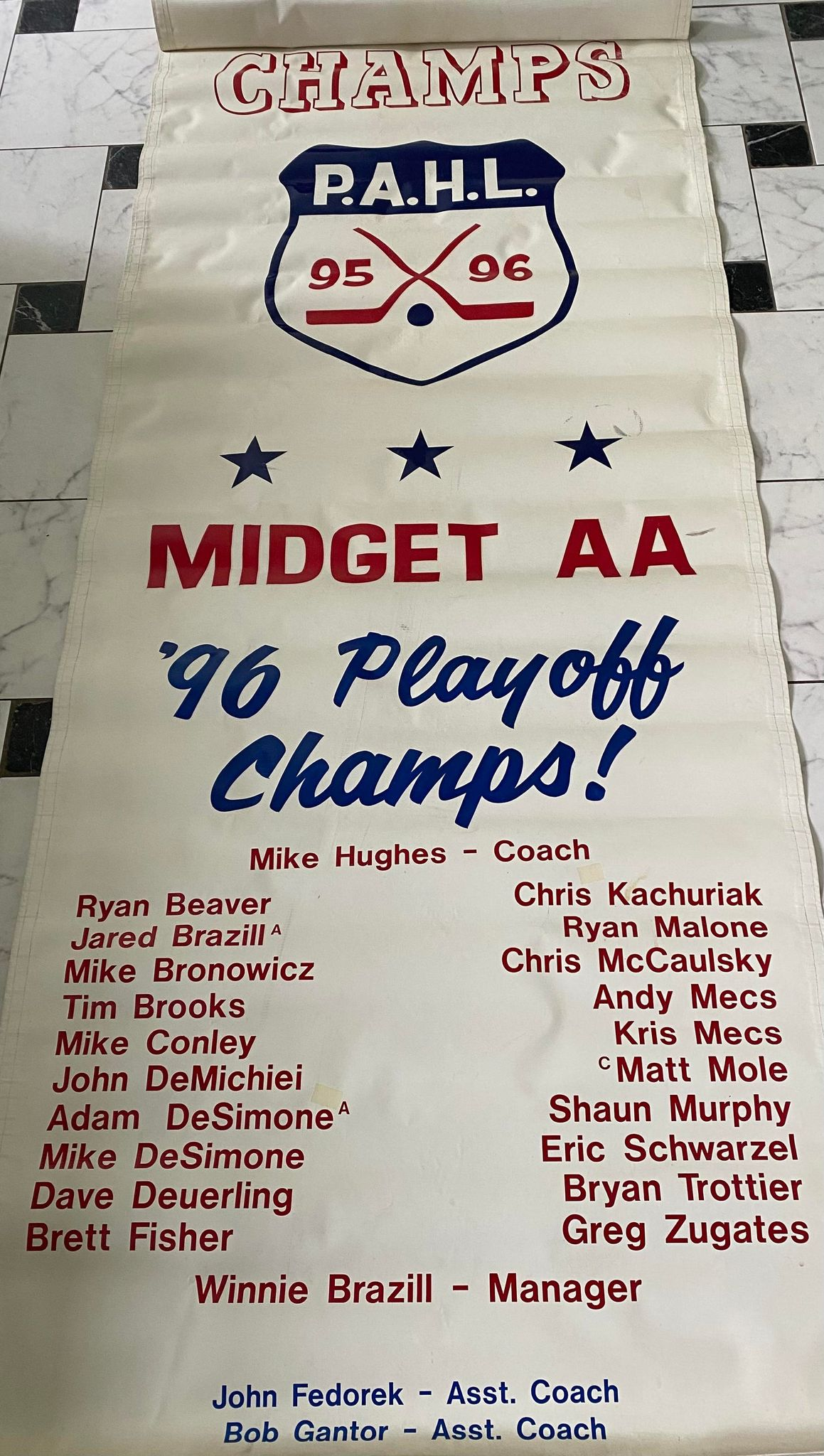
1995-96 MLHA PAHL Midget AA Playoff Championship Banner

Malone is the son of former Penguins forward Greg Malone and is the first Pittsburgh area native to play for the Penguins. Ryan's jersey number was #12 in tribute to his father Greg, who wore that number for Pittsburgh. Before the 2010–11 season, he relinquished his #12 jersey to the incoming Simon Gagné, and began wearing #6. Prior to Ryan Malone signing with Tampa Bay in the 2008 off-season, the Lightning hired Greg Malone as their head scout for professional talent. His cousin Brad Malone is also a professional hockey forward, currently playing for the Edmonton Oilers organization.

Malone has two sons from a previous marriage. He currently resides in Minnesota.

In 1996, Ryan's Midget AA team won the PAHL Playoffs.

=== Arrest ===
On April 12, 2014, Malone was arrested by Tampa police and charged with driving under the influence and cocaine possession after he was pulled over in an early-morning traffic stop when police allegedly saw him make a left turn from the center lane and strike a curb. According to the arrest report, Malone had 1.3 grams of cocaine in a pocket. He was released from jail after posting a $2,500 bond. On May 1, 2014, Malone's attorney, Wes Trombley, entered a plea of not guilty to the charges. On August 19, 2014, Malone pleaded no contest to the DUI charge and agreed to a pretrial diversion program on a drug charge.

== Career statistics ==
=== Regular season and playoffs ===
| | | | Regular season | | | | | Playoffs |
| Season | Team | League | GP | G | A | Pts | PIM | GP | G | A | Pts | PIM |
|---|---|---|---|---|---|---|---|---|---|---|---|---|
| 1995–96 | Upper St. Clair High School | HS–PA | — | — | — | — | — | — | — | — | — | — |
| 1996–97 | Upper St. Clair High School | HS–PA | — | — | — | — | — | — | — | — | — | — |
| 1997–98 | Shattuck–Saint Mary's | HS–Prep | 50 | 41 | 44 | 85 | 69 | — | — | — | — | — |
| 1998–99 | Omaha Lancers | USHL | 51 | 14 | 22 | 36 | 81 | 12 | 2 | 4 | 6 | 23 |
| 1999–00 | St. Cloud State University | WCHA | 38 | 9 | 21 | 30 | 68 | — | — | — | — | — |
| 2000–01 | St. Cloud State University | WCHA | 36 | 7 | 18 | 25 | 52 | — | — | — | — | — |
| 2001–02 | St. Cloud State University | WCHA | 41 | 24 | 25 | 49 | 76 | — | — | — | — | — |
| 2002–03 | St. Cloud State University | WCHA | 27 | 16 | 20 | 36 | 85 | — | — | — | — | — |
| 2002–03 | Wilkes–Barre/Scranton Penguins | AHL | 3 | 0 | 1 | 1 | 2 | — | — | — | — | — |
| 2003–04 | Pittsburgh Penguins | NHL | 81 | 22 | 21 | 43 | 64 | — | — | — | — | — |
| 2004–05 | Blues | SM-l | 9 | 2 | 1 | 3 | 36 | — | — | — | — | — |
| 2004–05 | Ritten Sport | ITA | 10 | 6 | 1 | 7 | 20 | 6 | 4 | 4 | 8 | 36 |
| 2004–05 | HC Ambrì–Piotta | NLA | — | — | — | — | — | 1 | 0 | 0 | 0 | 2 |
| 2005–06 | Pittsburgh Penguins | NHL | 77 | 22 | 22 | 44 | 63 | — | — | — | — | — |
| 2006–07 | Pittsburgh Penguins | NHL | 64 | 16 | 15 | 31 | 71 | 5 | 0 | 0 | 0 | 0 |
| 2007–08 | Pittsburgh Penguins | NHL | 77 | 27 | 24 | 51 | 103 | 20 | 6 | 10 | 16 | 25 |
| 2008–09 | Tampa Bay Lightning | NHL | 70 | 26 | 19 | 45 | 98 | — | — | — | — | — |
| 2009–10 | Tampa Bay Lightning | NHL | 69 | 21 | 26 | 47 | 68 | — | — | — | — | — |
| 2010–11 | Tampa Bay Lightning | NHL | 54 | 14 | 24 | 38 | 51 | 18 | 3 | 3 | 6 | 24 |
| 2011–12 | Tampa Bay Lightning | NHL | 68 | 20 | 28 | 48 | 82 | — | — | — | — | — |
| 2012–13 | Tampa Bay Lightning | NHL | 24 | 6 | 2 | 8 | 22 | — | — | — | — | — |
| 2013–14 | Tampa Bay Lightning | NHL | 57 | 5 | 10 | 15 | 67 | — | — | — | — | — |
| 2014–15 | New York Rangers | NHL | 6 | 0 | 0 | 0 | 4 | — | — | — | — | — |
| 2014–15 | Hartford Wolf Pack | AHL | 24 | 4 | 5 | 9 | 29 | — | — | — | — | — |
| 2017–18 | Iowa Wild | AHL | 12 | 0 | 2 | 2 | 16 | — | — | — | — | — |
| 2022 | Team Fuhr | 3ICE | 10 | 4 | 1 | 5 | — | — | — | — | — | — |
| NHL totals | | | 647 | 179 | 191 | 370 | 693 | 43 | 9 | 13 | 22 | 49 |

=== International ===
Medal record

Representing United States

Winter Olympics
| Silver medal – second place | 2010 Vancouver | |

World Championships
| Bronze medal – third place | 2004 Czech Republic | |

| Year | Team | Event | Result | GP | G | A | Pts | PIM |
|---|---|---|---|---|---|---|---|---|
| 2004 | United States | WC | 3rd place, bronze medalist(s) | 9 | 3 | 0 | 3 | 2 |
| 2006 | United States | WC | 7th | 7 | 2 | 2 | 4 | 12 |
| 2010 | United States | OG | 2nd place, silver medalist(s) | 6 | 3 | 2 | 5 | 6 |
| Senior totals | | | | 22 | 8 | 4 | 12 | 20 |

== Awards ==
| Award | Year |
NHL
| All-Rookie Team | 2004 |
