= New York Rangers =

National Hockey League team in New York City

- 2026–27 New York Rangers season
- Conference: Eastern
- Division: Metropolitan
- Founded: 1926
- History: New York Rangers; 1926–present
- Home arena: Madison Square Garden
- City: New York City, New York
- Team colors: Royal blue, red, white
- Media: MSG Network; MSG Sportsnet; 880 ESPN New York
- Owner(s): Madison Square Garden Sports (James L. Dolan, chairman)
- General manager: Chris Drury
- Head coach: Mike Sullivan
- Captain: J. T. Miller
- Minor league affiliates: Hartford Wolf Pack (AHL)
- Stanley Cups: 4 (1927–28, 1932–33, 1939–40, 1993–94)
- Conference championships: 2 (1993–94, 2013–14)
- Presidents' Trophies: 4 (1991–92, 1993–94, 2014–15, 2023–24)
- Division championships: 8 (1926–27, 1931–32, 1989–90, 1991–92, 1993–94, 2011–12, 2014–15, 2023–24)
- Official website: nhl.com/rangers

The New York Rangers are a professional ice hockey team based in New York City. The Rangers compete in the National Hockey League (NHL) as a member of the Metropolitan Division in the Eastern Conference. The team plays its home games at Madison Square Garden, an arena they share with the New York Knicks of the National Basketball Association (NBA). They are one of three NHL franchises located in the New York metropolitan area; the others are the New Jersey Devils and New York Islanders.

Founded in 1926 by Tex Rickard, the Rangers are one of the Original Six teams that competed in the NHL before its 1967 expansion, along with the Boston Bruins, Chicago Blackhawks, Detroit Red Wings, Montreal Canadiens and Toronto Maple Leafs. The team attained success early on under the guidance of Lester Patrick, who coached a team containing Frank Boucher, Murray Murdoch, and Bun and Bill Cook to win the Stanley Cup in only their second season. In 1928, they became the first NHL franchise in the United States to win the trophy, and are still the fastest true expansion team in NHL history to do so. The team won two more Stanley Cups in 1933 and 1940.

Following this initial grace period, the franchise struggled between the 1940s and 1960s, where playoff appearances and successes were infrequent. The team enjoyed a mini-renaissance in the 1970s, making the Stanley Cup Final twice, losing to the Bruins in 1972 and the Canadiens in 1979. The Rangers subsequently embraced a rebuild for much of the 1980s and early 1990s, which eventually paid dividends in 1994, when the team, led by Mark Messier, Brian Leetch, Adam Graves, and Mike Richter, captured their fourth Stanley Cup.

The team was unable to duplicate that success in the years that followed, and entered into another period of mediocrity, enduring a franchise-record seven-year postseason drought from 1998 to 2005. After the arrival of goaltender Henrik Lundqvist in 2006, the Rangers thrived, missing the playoffs just once between 2006 and 2017. The Rangers returned to the Stanley Cup Final in 2014, falling to the Los Angeles Kings in five games. Between 2012 and 2024, they reached the Eastern Conference finals five times.

== History ==
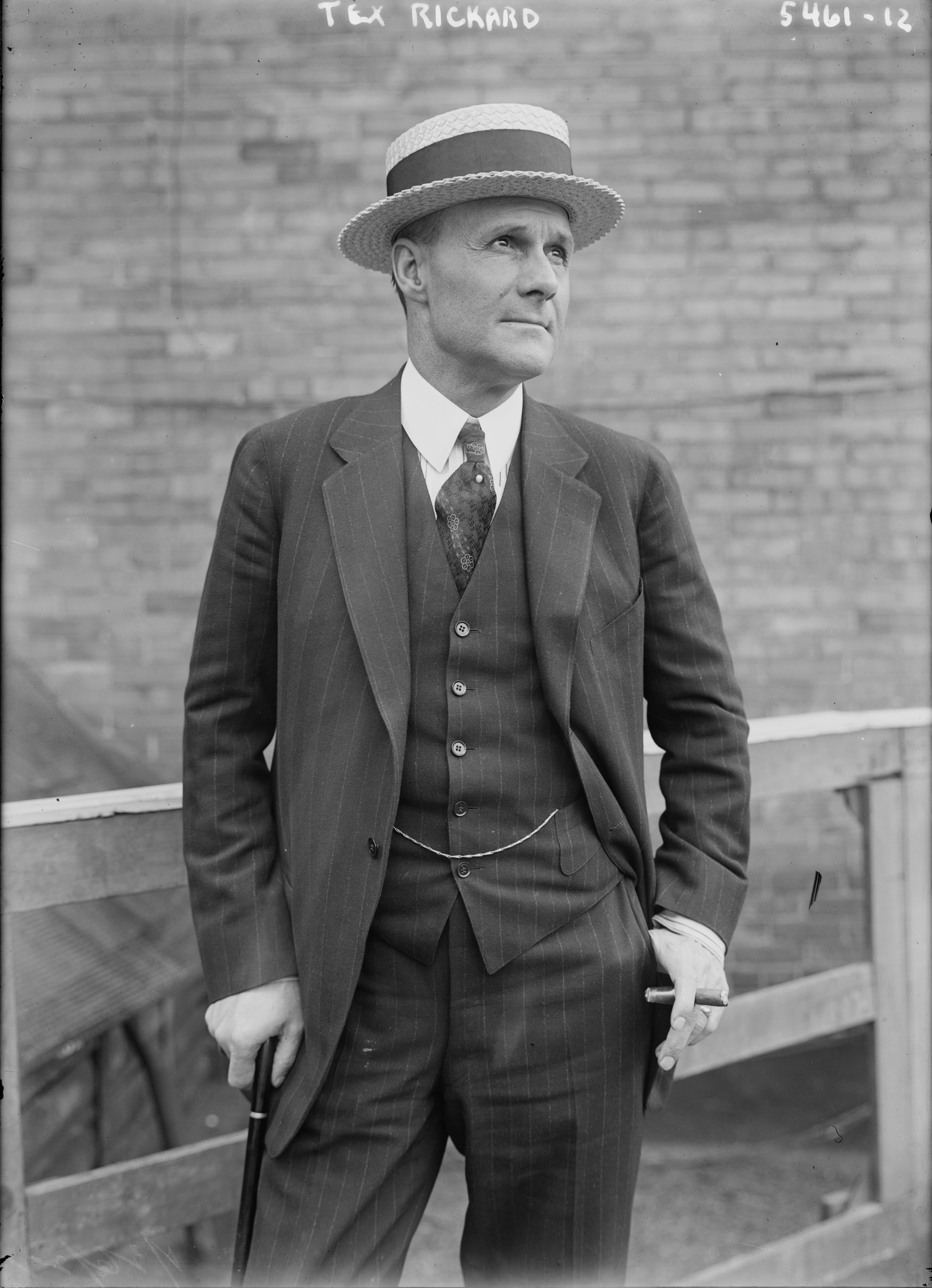
Tex Rickard, president of Madison Square Garden, was awarded the Rangers in 1926.

=== Early years (1926–1942) ===
George Lewis "Tex" Rickard, president of Madison Square Garden, was awarded an NHL franchise for the 1926–27 season to compete with the New York Americans, who had begun play at the Garden the previous season. The Americans' early success in their inaugural season exceeded expectations, leading Rickard to pursue a second team for the Garden despite promising the Americans that they were going to be the only ice hockey team to play there. The team was originally incorporated under the name "New York Giants Professional Hockey Club" during a league meeting with NHL president Frank Calder on April 17, 1926, but during the meeting the name was then changed to "New York Rangers Hockey Club." The franchise's nickname is attributed to sports editor of the New York Herald Tribune, George Haley, who referred to the new team as "Tex's Rangers" because of Rickard's decision to bring a new NHL team to New York.

Rickard's franchise began play in the 1926–27 season. The first team crest played on the club's name with a rearing horse sketched in blue carrying a cowboy waving a hockey stick aloft, with the word "TEX'S" in a crescent at the top of the emblem with "RANGERS" below it. Rickard rejected that design, and management settled on a crest similar to the Americans, a "shield" shape with "NEW YORK" horizontally across the top of the shield and "RANGERS" written diagonally from the top left to bottom right. The diagonal positioning of "RANGERS" carried over to the front of the solid blue jerseys. Future Toronto Maple Leafs owner Conn Smythe was hired to assemble the team. However, he had a falling-out with Rickard's associate, John S. Hammond, and was fired as manager-coach on the eve of the first season – he was paid a then-hefty $2,500 to leave. Smythe was replaced by Pacific Coast Hockey Association co-founder Lester Patrick. The new team Smythe assembled turned out to be a winner. The Rangers won the American Division title their first year but lost to the Boston Bruins in the playoffs.

The team's early success led to players becoming minor celebrities and fixtures in New York City's Roaring Twenties nightlife. It was during this time, playing at the Garden on 49th Street, blocks away from Times Square, that the Rangers obtained their nickname "The Broadway Blueshirts". On December 13, 1929, the Rangers became the first team in the NHL to travel by plane when they hired the Curtiss-Wright Corporation to fly them to Toronto for a game against the Maple Leafs, which they lost 7–6.

==== Stanley Cup success (1927–1942) ====
In only their second season, they won the 1928 Stanley Cup, defeating the Montreal Maroons in five games. One of the most memorable stories that emerged from the Cup Final series involved Patrick playing in goal at the age of 44. At the time, teams were not required to dress a backup goaltender. When the Rangers' starting goaltender, Lorne Chabot, left a game with an eye injury, Maroons head coach Eddie Gerard vetoed Patrick's original choice for an emergency replacement, Alex Connell of the Ottawa Senators, who was in attendance. An angry Patrick lined up between the pipes for two periods in game two of the Stanley Cup Final, allowing one goal to Maroons center Nels Stewart. Frank Boucher scored the game-winning goal in overtime for New York.

After a loss to the Bruins in the 1929 Stanley Cup Final, the Rangers, led by brothers Bill and Bun Cook on the right and left wings, respectively, and Frank Boucher at center, defeated the Maple Leafs in the 1933 Stanley Cup Final to win their second Stanley Cup. Lester Patrick stepped down as head coach and was replaced by Frank Boucher.

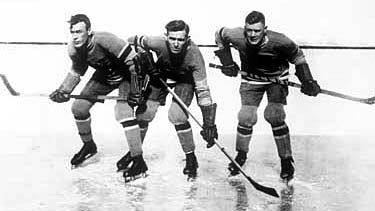
The Bread Line was the Rangers' first notable line. Consisting of Bill Cook, Bun Cook and Frank Boucher, they played together from 1926 to 1937.

In the 1939–40 season, the Rangers finished the regular season in second place behind Boston. The two teams then met in the first round of the playoffs. The Bruins gained a 2–1 series lead on New York, but the Rangers recovered to win three straight games, defeating the first-place Bruins four games to two. The Rangers' first-round victory advanced them to the Stanley Cup Final, where the Rangers defeated the Toronto Maple Leafs in six games. Following the Brooklyn Americans fold in 1942, and the league reneging on Red Dutton's promise to have the Americans return, Dutton swore a curse on the Rangers.

=== Original Six era (1942–1967) ===
The Rangers collapsed by the mid-1940s, losing games by scores as lopsided as 15–0. In 1943–44, goaltender Ken McAuley led the league with 39 losses and 310 goals allowed in 50 games played; his 6.24 goals-against average that year remains the worst in NHL history by a goaltender playing at least 25 games in a season. They missed the playoffs for five consecutive seasons before earning the fourth and final playoff spot in 1947–48, losing in the first round. In December 1948, Boucher resigned as head coach while remaining general manager, giving control to Lynn Patrick, the son of Lester Patrick. In the 1950 Stanley Cup Final, the Rangers were forced to play all of their games, including "home" games, in Toronto, while the circus was held at the Garden. They lost to the Detroit Red Wings in overtime in the seventh game of the series.

During this time, Red Wings owner James E. Norris became the largest stockholder in the Garden. However, he did not buy controlling interest in the arena, which would have violated the NHL's rule against one person owning more than one team. Nonetheless, he had enough support on the board to exercise de facto control. The Rangers missed the playoffs 12 of the next 16 years within the remainder of the Original Six era. Boucher, who had been general manager of the squad, resigned citing depression over the team's inability to be a contender. His successor, Muzz Patrick, the younger brother of Lynn Patrick, did not fare well either, resigning in 1964 following criticism about management's unwillingness to improve the team by spending money. Emile Francis took over as both coach and general manager. After a five-year absence, the team made the playoffs, aided by goaltender Eddie Giacomin and 37-year-old former Montreal Canadiens right wing Bernie "Boom Boom" Geoffrion, who signed out of retirement in 1966.

=== Post-Original Six era (1967–1993) ===
==== GAG line and championship appearances (1967–1980) ====
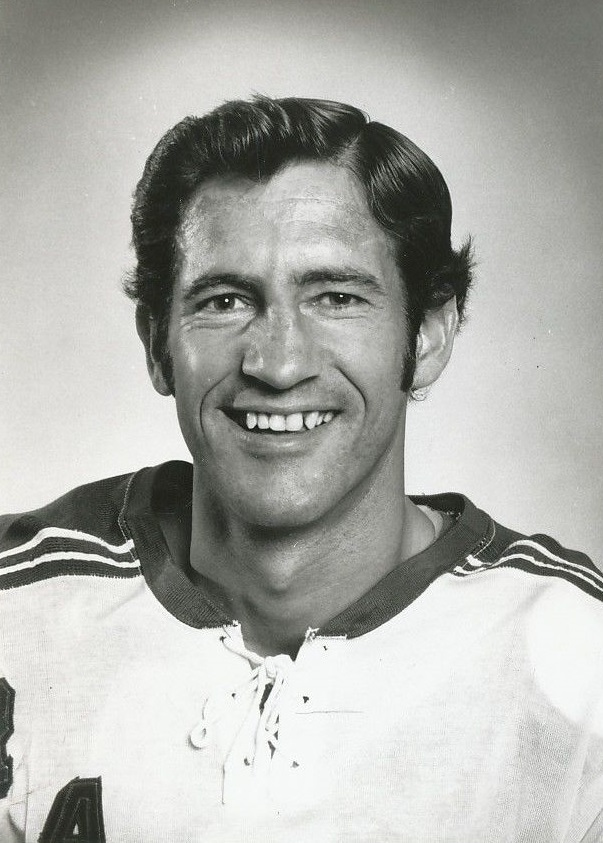
Jean Ratelle played with the Rangers from 1960 to 1975.

In 1968, the Rangers moved into the fourth version of Madison Square Garden. During the 1969–70 season, the Rangers acquired veteran goaltender Terry Sawchuk, playing his final season with New York.

In 1971–72, the Rangers reached the 1972 Stanley Cup Final despite losing high-scoring center Jean Ratelle to injury during the last half of the regular season. The strength of players such as Brad Park, Jean Ratelle, Vic Hadfield and Rod Gilbert (the last three constructing the famed "GAG line", standing for "goal-a-game") carried them through the playoffs. They defeated the defending-champion Canadiens in the first round and the Chicago Black Hawks in the second, but lost to the Bruins in the Cup Final.

The following season in 1972–73, the team made the semifinals against the Black Hawks again, but lost in five games. The Rangers' conference semifinals series against the Philadelphia Flyers in the 1974 playoffs, which they lost in seven games became the first Original Six club to lose a playoff series to a 1967 expansion team. This series was noted for a game seven fight between Dale Rolfe of the Rangers and Dave Schultz of the Flyers. The Rangers' new rivals, the New York Islanders, who entered the League in 1972–73 after paying a territorial fee – $4 million – to the Rangers, were their first-round opponents in the 1975 playoffs. After splitting the first two games, the Islanders defeated the Rangers 11 seconds into overtime of the deciding game three.

In a blockbuster trade with the Boston Bruins, the Rangers acquired Esposito and Carol Vadnais from the Bruins for Park, Ratelle and Joe Zanussi in 1975–76. On January 8, 1976, Emile Francis was fired after the team got to a bad start. Ron Stewart who was coaching the team was also fired. John Ferguson Sr. took over as both coach and general manager for the remainder of the season. To assist in Ferguson's contention building, the team acquired Ken Hodge from the Bruins in exchange for Rick Middleton. However, the team failed to make a playoff push and Ferguson was fired in 1978. Madison Square Garden's new owner, Sonny Werblin, hired Fred Shero to take over as head coach and general manager. In the 1979 Stanley Cup playoffs, the Rangers defeated the Islanders in the semifinals and advanced to the 1979 Stanley Cup Final, losing to the Canadiens.

==== Playoff struggles (1980–1993) ====
In four consecutive playoffs (1981–1984), the Rangers were eliminated by the rival Islanders, who went on to win the Stanley Cup in 1981, 1982, and 1983.

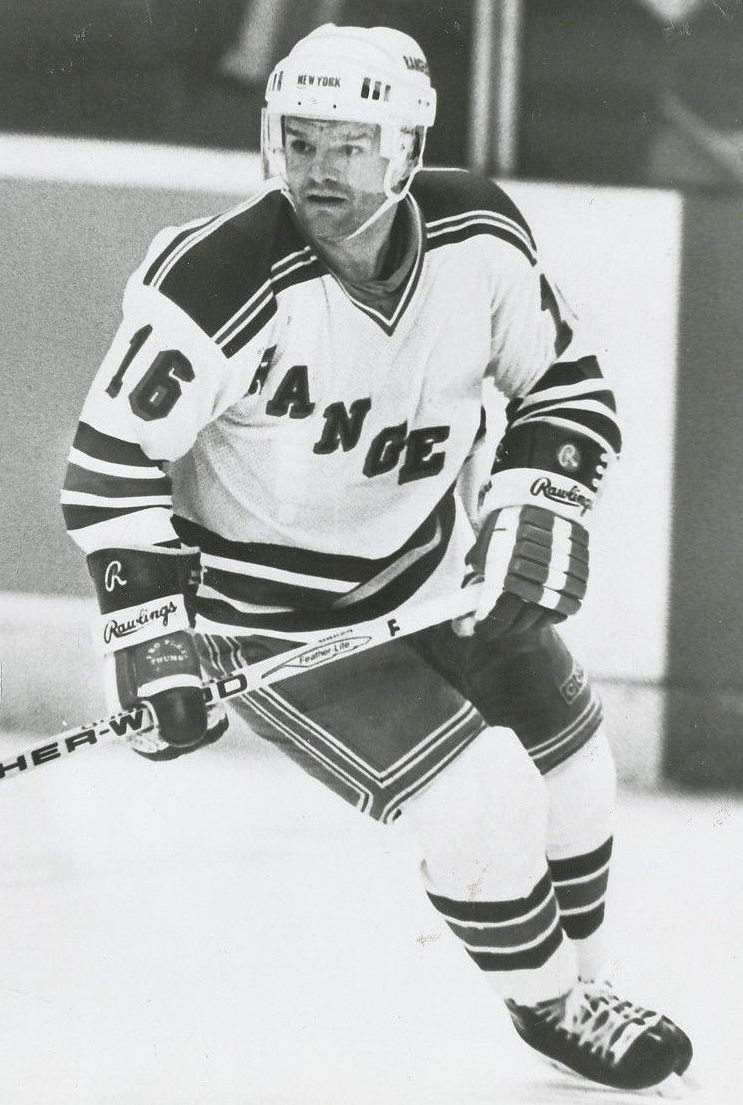
Marcel Dionne, acquired by the Rangers in 1987

The Rangers stayed competitive through the 1980s and early 1990s, making the playoffs each year. In the 1986 Stanley Cup playoffs, the Rangers, behind the play of rookie goaltender John Vanbiesbrouck, upended the Patrick Division-winning Flyers in five games followed by a six-game win over the Washington Capitals in the Patrick Division finals. Montreal disposed of the Rangers in the Wales Conference finals behind a rookie goaltender of their own, Patrick Roy. During the 1986–87 season, the team acquired superstar center Marcel Dionne after almost 12 years with the Los Angeles Kings.

Frustration was at its peak when the 1991–92 Rangers captured the Presidents' Trophy. They took a 2–1 series lead on the defending champion Pittsburgh Penguins and then faltered in three straight (some observers note a Ron Francis slapshot from outside the blue line that eluded goaltender Mike Richter as the series' turning point). The following year, they missed the playoffs and head coach Roger Neilson was fired and replaced by Ron Smith mid-season. Smith was dismissed at the conclusion of the season.

During this period, the Rangers were owned by Gulf+Western, which was renamed to Paramount Communications in 1989.

=== Ending the curse (1993–94) ===
The 1993–94 season was the Rangers' most successful in 54 years. With several transactions up to this point, the Rangers had acquired seven players who had been part of the Edmonton Oilers' Cup-winning teams: Oilers captain (and new Rangers captain) Mark Messier, Adam Graves, Kevin Lowe, Jeff Beukeboom, Esa Tikkanen, Craig MacTavish, and Glenn Anderson. Graves set a team record with 52 goals, breaking the prior record of 50 held by Vic Hadfield. The Rangers clinched the Presidents' Trophy by finishing with the best record in the NHL at 52–24–8, setting a franchise record with 112 points earned. The Rangers advanced through the first two rounds of the playoffs, sweeping the New York Islanders, and then defeating the Washington Capitals in five games. However, in the conference finals against the third-seeded New Jersey Devils, with the Rangers down 3–2 in the series and heading back to the Meadowlands for the sixth game, Messier guaranteed a win to the press. During the game he scored a hat trick in the third period to lead the Rangers to a 4–2 win, setting up a seventh game back at Madison Square Garden. The Rangers won game seven, 2–1, when Stéphane Matteau scored a goal in double overtime, leading the team to the Cup Final for the first time since 1979. In the Final, the Rangers led the series 3–1, but the Canucks won the next two games to force a seventh game. In the seventh game, the Rangers took a 2–0 first period lead, with Messier scoring later to put the Rangers up 3–1, the eventual Cup-winning goal, as the Rangers won 3–2. Defenceman Brian Leetch became the first American-born player to win the Conn Smythe Trophy as playoff MVP, while Alexander Karpovtsev, Alexei Kovalev, Sergei Nemchinov and Sergei Zubov became the first Russians to have their names engraved on the Cup.

=== Expensive acquisitions and postseason drought (1994–2005) ===
Despite coaching the Rangers to a regular season first-place finish and the Stanley Cup victory, head coach Mike Keenan left after a dispute with general manager Neil Smith. Paramount Communications, the owners of the Rangers, were acquired by Viacom who then sold the team to ITT Corporation and Cablevision in August 1994. During the lockout-shortened 1994–95 season, the Rangers won their first-round series with the Quebec Nordiques, but lost in the second round of the playoffs to the Philadelphia Flyers in four games with succeeding head coach Colin Campbell. Neil Smith orchestrated a deal that sent Sergei Zubov and center Petr Nedvěd to Pittsburgh in exchange for defenseman Ulf Samuelsson and left-winger Luc Robitaille in the summer of 1995. The Rangers defeated the Canadiens in six games in the 1996 playoffs, but lost their second-round series to the Penguins in five games.

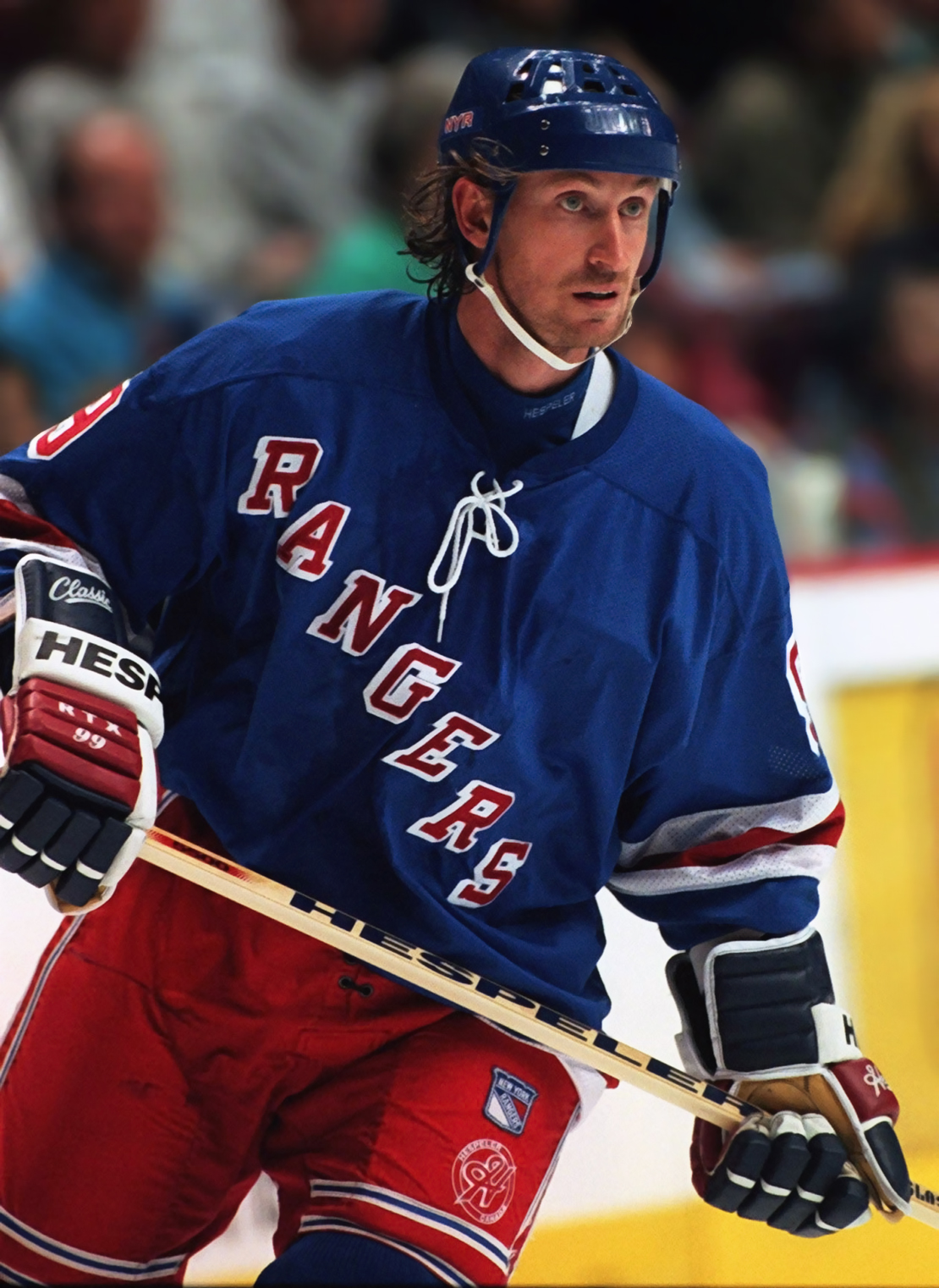
The Rangers acquired Wayne Gretzky as a free agent in the 1996 offseason.

The Rangers then acquired Wayne Gretzky in 1996. With Gretzky, the team went to the conference finals in 1997, where they lost 4–1 to the Flyers. During the season, ITT sold their stake of the Rangers to Cablevision. Mark Messier, a former Oiler teammate of Gretzky's, left in the summer of 1997 and the team failed in a bid to replace him with Colorado Avalanche superstar Joe Sakic. Robitaille was also traded during the summer for Kevin Stevens. The Rangers missed the playoffs for seven consecutive seasons, finishing no higher than fourth in their division. Gretzky retired at the end of the 1998–99 season.

In March 2000, Smith was fired along with head coach John Muckler, and that summer, Cablevision CEO and owner James Dolan hired Glen Sather as general manager. By the end of the 2000–01 season, the Rangers had acquired some veterans. Messier returned to New York, Theoren Fleury joined the Rangers after spending most of his career with the Calgary Flames and Eric Lindros was traded to the Rangers by the Flyers. The Rangers also acquired Pavel Bure late in 2001–02 from the Florida Panthers. Approaching the 2004–05 NHL lockout, they also acquired Alexei Kovalev, Jaromír Jágr, Martin Ručinský, and Bobby Holík. However, none of the acquisitions helped them obtain a playoff spot. Towards the end of the 2003–04 season, general manager Glen Sather traded away Brian Leetch, Kovalev, Rucinsky, and Nedved.

=== Henrik Lundqvist era (2005–2020) ===
==== Return to the playoffs (2005–2011) ====
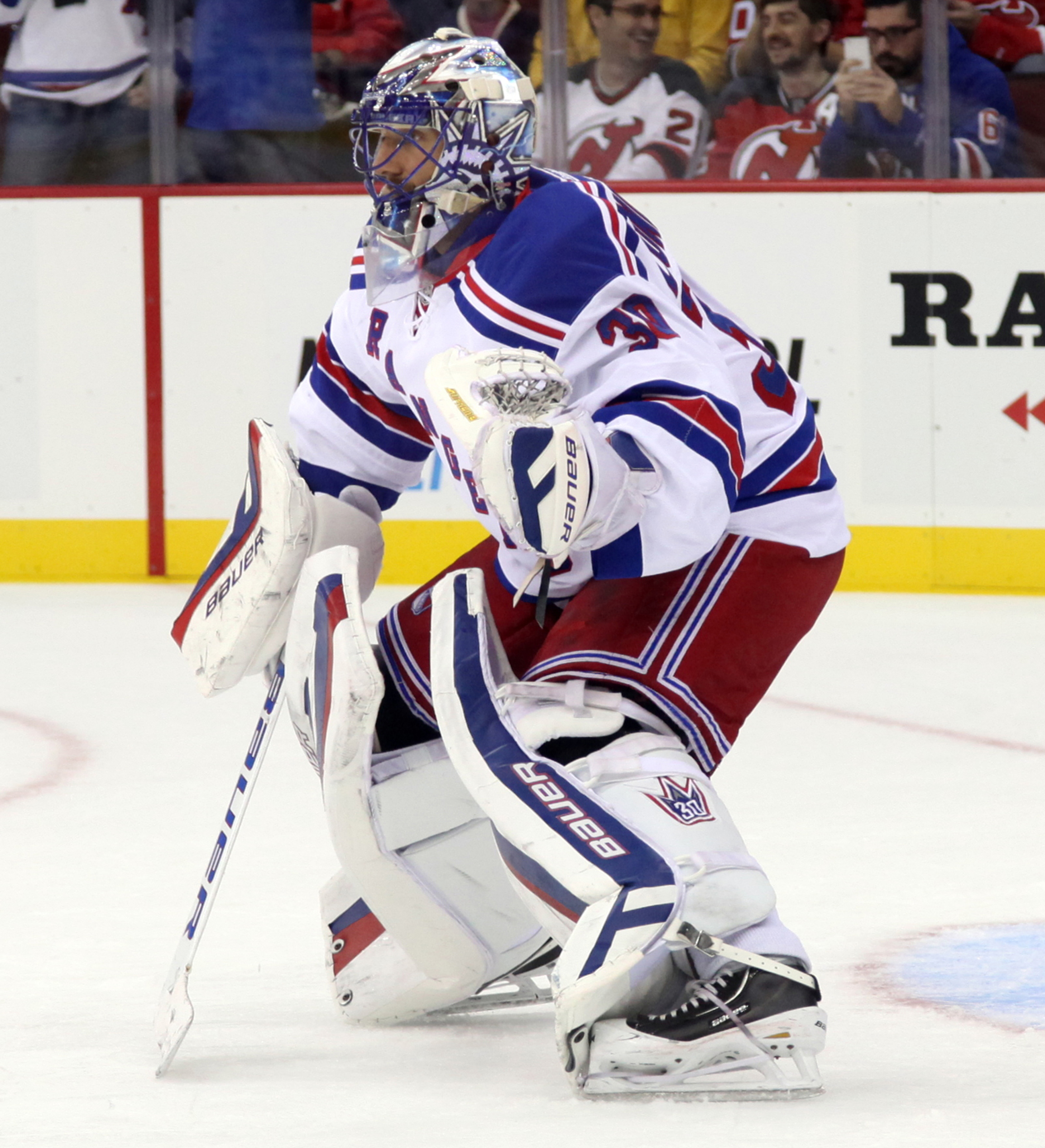
Stellar performances by rookie goaltender Henrik Lundqvist during the 2005–06 season led to the Rangers' best record since 1993–94.

With the emergence of Swedish rookie goaltender Henrik Lundqvist during the 2005–06 season, the Rangers finished the season with a record of 44–26–12, their best record since 1993–94. Jagr broke the Rangers' single-season points record with a first-period assist in a 5–1 win against the New York Islanders on March 29, 2006. The assist gave him 110 points on the season, breaking Jean Ratelle's record. Less than two weeks later, on April 8, Jagr scored his 53rd goal of the season against the Boston Bruins, breaking the club record previously held by Adam Graves. Two games prior, on April 4, the Rangers defeated the Philadelphia Flyers 3–2, in a shootout, to clinch a playoff spot for the first time since 1996–97. In the 2006 conference quarterfinals, the Rangers faced off against the Devils and were defeated in a four-game sweep. Jagr fell two points short of winning his sixth Art Ross Trophy as scoring champion in 2005–06, but did win his third Pearson Award as the players' choice for the most outstanding player.

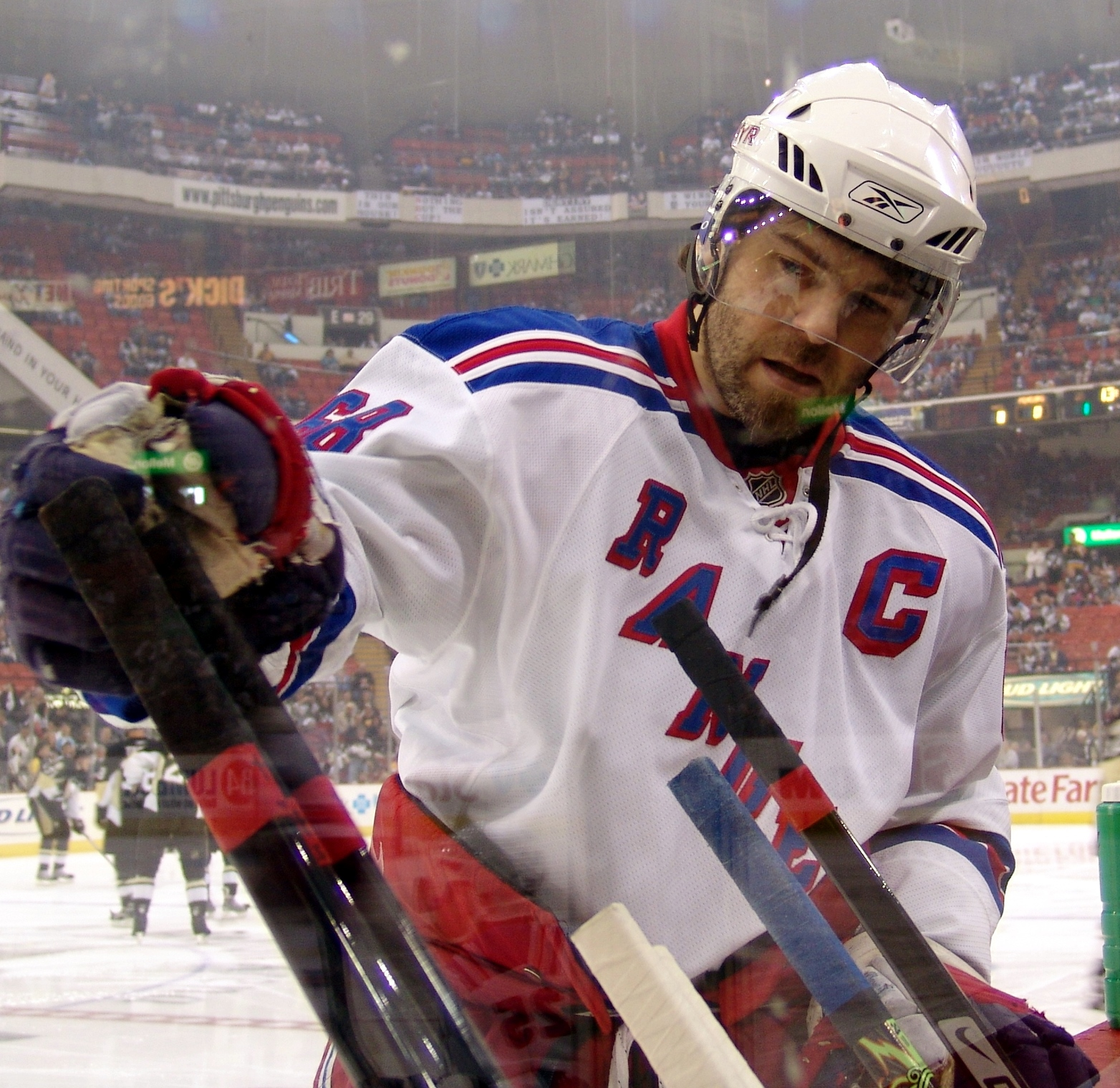
Jaromír Jágr was named team captain at the start of the 2006–07 NHL season.

In the 2006–07 offseason, the Rangers signed Triple Gold Club winner and 12-time 30-goal scorer Brendan Shanahan to a one-year contract. On October 5, 2006, Jagr was named the first team captain since Mark Messier's retirement. On February 5, 2007, the Rangers acquired forward Sean Avery in a trade with the Los Angeles Kings. The Rangers swept the Atlanta Thrashers in the first round of the 2007 playoffs. However, they were eliminated in the next round by the Buffalo Sabres.

At the 2007 NHL entry draft, the Rangers chose Alexei Cherepanov 17th overall; he had been ranked by the NHL Central Scouting Bureau as the number one European skater. In the 2007 offseason, they signed Scott Gomez to a seven-year contract, as well as Chris Drury to a five-year deal. The Rangers made the playoffs for the third consecutive season and the second round for the second consecutive season. In the first round against the New Jersey Devils, in game three, Sean Avery positioned himself facing Devils goaltender Martin Brodeur and moved his arms and stick in an attempt to screen any shots from the Rangers. After the game, the league made it an unsportsmanlike conduct penalty to purposefully screen a goaltender by waving one's arms and stick. Following their first-round victory, they lost to the Pittsburgh Penguins in the second round. The following offseason saw the departures of captain Jaromír Jágr to the Kontinental Hockey League (KHL) and Martin Straka, who left to play in the Czech Republic.

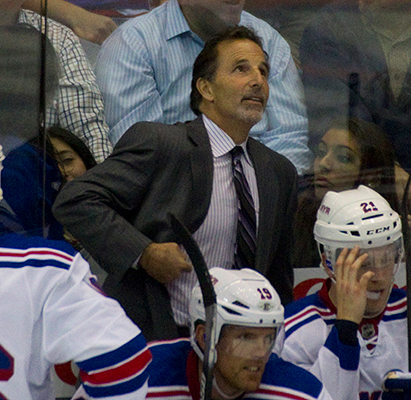
John Tortorella was named the team's head coach in 2009, maintaining the position until 2013.

Following Jagr's departure, Chris Drury was named captain on October 3, 2008. The Rangers were one of four NHL teams to open the 2008–09 season in Europe, being featured in the Victoria Cup final, defeating the European Champions Cup winner Metallurg Magnitogorsk in Bern, Switzerland. This was followed by two NHL regular season games against Tampa Bay in Prague on October 4 and 5; the Rangers won both games. However, on October 13, Alexei Cherepanov, who was New York's 2007 first-round pick, collapsed and died during a KHL game in Russia. After the Rangers went 2–7–3 in 12 games, coach Tom Renney was fired, with 2004 Stanley Cup and Jack Adams Award winner John Tortorella named as his replacement. The Rangers made the 2009 playoffs, but gave up a 3–1 series lead to the Washington Capitals to lose in seven games.

On June 30, 2009, the Rangers traded Scott Gomez, Tom Pyatt, and Michael Busto to the Montreal Canadiens for Ryan McDonagh, Chris Higgins, Pavel Valentenko, and Doug Janik. The Rangers also signed Marián Gáborík on the first day of free agency. In the 2009–10 season, the Rangers failed to make the playoffs for the first time in five years, losing the final game in a shootout against the Philadelphia Flyers.

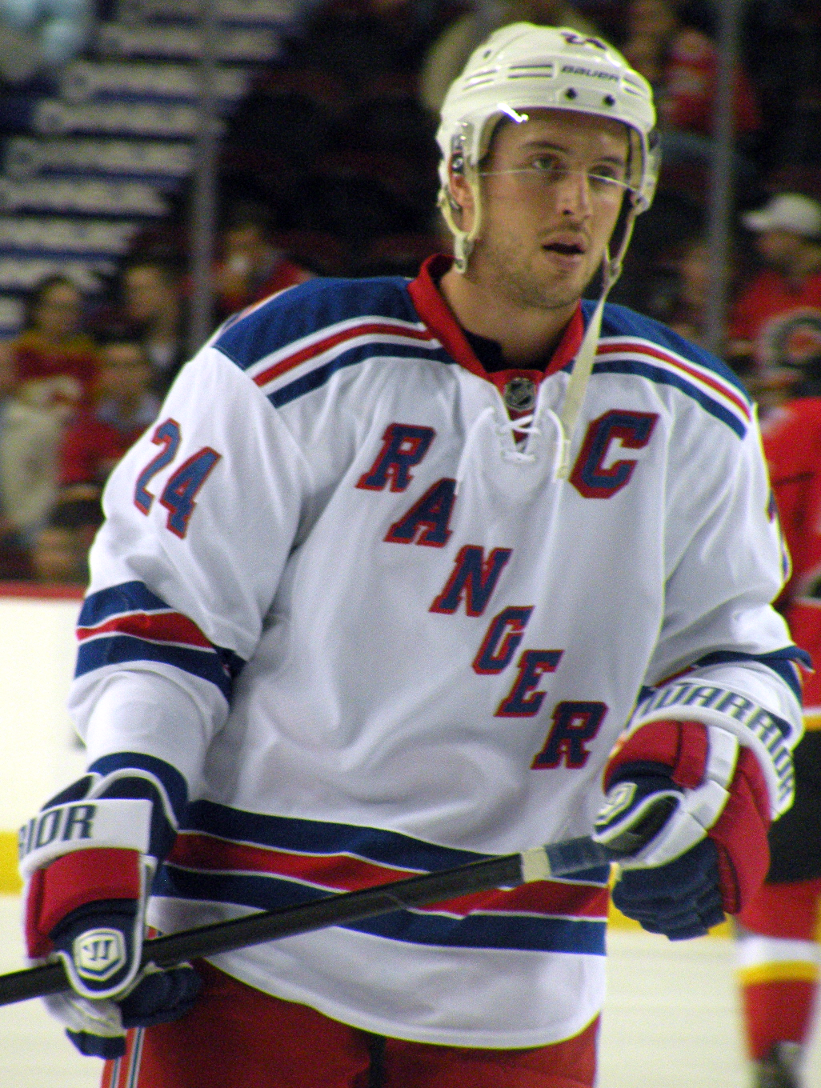
On September 12, 2011, Ryan Callahan was named the 26th captain in Rangers history.

For the 2010–11 season, the team signed Norwegian forward Mats Zuccarello. The Rangers' playoff chances came down to the final day of the regular season for the second consecutive year. The team defeated the New Jersey Devils and passed the Carolina Hurricanes in the standings, putting the Rangers in the playoffs. The Rangers faced Washington in the first round and lost the series in five games.

On May 13, 2011, Rangers forward Derek Boogaard was found dead in his Minnesota apartment. On June 29, the Rangers bought out captain Chris Drury's contract. On July 3, the Rangers signed free agent Brad Richards to a nine-year contract. On September 12, Ryan Callahan was named the 26th captain in the Rangers' history.

==== Return to the Stanley Cup Final and third Presidents' Trophy (2011–2016) ====
In the 2011–12 season, the team finished as the top seed in the Eastern Conference, recording 51 wins and 109 points. Lundqvist was awarded the Vezina Trophy for the League's best goaltender. In the playoffs, they defeated both the Senators and Capitals in seven games respectively. In the conference finals, they faced the New Jersey Devils. After leading the series 2–1, the Rangers lost the next three games, losing game six to New Jersey in overtime.

On July 23, 2012, the Rangers traded Brandon Dubinsky, Artem Anisimov, Tim Erixon and a 2013 first-round draft pick to the Columbus Blue Jackets in exchange for Rick Nash, Steven Delisle, and a 2013 conditional third-round pick. At the 2013 trade deadline on April 3, the Rangers traded Marián Gáborík and Steven Delisle to Columbus for Derick Brassard, Derek Dorsett, John Moore, and a 2014 sixth-round draft pick. After the Rangers were eliminated in the second round of the playoffs by Boston, management fired head coach John Tortorella. On June 21, 2013, general manager Glen Sather formally introduced former Canucks head coach Alain Vigneault as Tortorella's replacement.

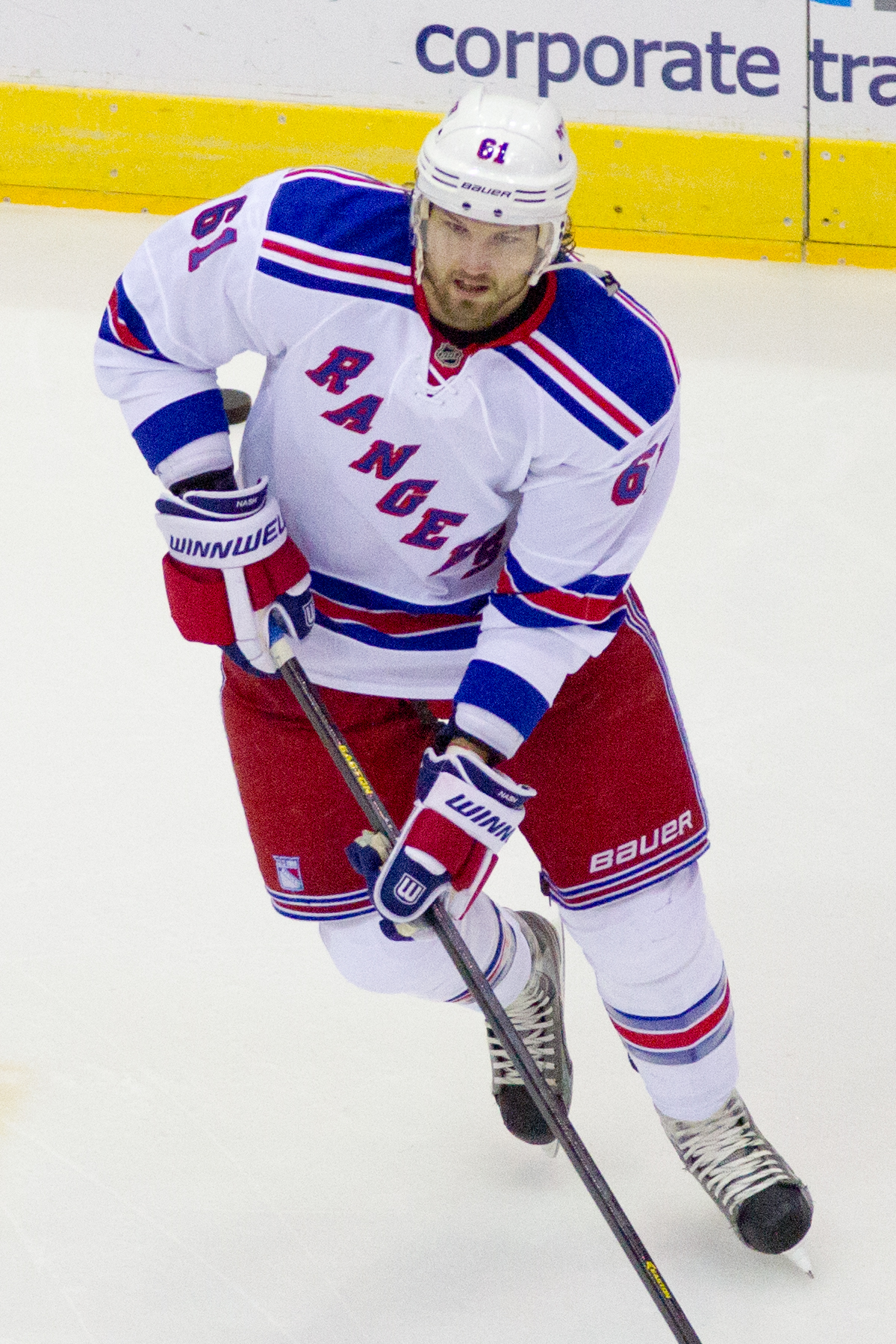
The Rangers acquired Rick Nash in a multi-player trade with the Columbus Blue Jackets in 2012.

On March 5, 2014, the Rangers traded their captain Ryan Callahan, along with a first-round draft pick in 2015, a conditional second-round pick in 2014, and a conditional seventh-round pick in 2015, for Tampa Bay captain Martin St. Louis. The trade occurred both due to the Rangers' and Callahan's inability to reach a contract extension, as well as St. Louis' growing tension with the Lightning organization and subsequent request to be traded to New York. The 2013–14 Rangers set a new franchise record of 25 road game wins. New York defeated Philadelphia in seven games in the first round of the 2014 playoffs, and in the next round rallied from a 3–1 series deficit to defeat Pittsburgh in seven games. They then defeated the Montreal Canadiens in six games to move onto the Cup Final to face the Los Angeles Kings. The Rangers lost the series in five games.

On June 20, 2014, a week after their season ended, the Rangers bought out the remaining six years of Brad Richards' contract. On October 6, defenseman Ryan McDonagh was named the Rangers' 27th captain in team history. In 2014–15, the Rangers won the Presidents' Trophy for the third time in franchise history by finishing with the best record in the NHL at 53–22–7. The 53 wins and 113 points both set franchise records. In the 2015 Stanley Cup playoffs, the Rangers dispatched the Pittsburgh Penguins in five games in the first round. The Rangers then came back from a 3–1 series deficit to win their second-round series against the Capitals in seven games, becoming the first team in NHL history to battle back from a 3–1 deficit in back-to-back seasons and sending the Rangers to the conference finals for the third time in four years. However, the Lightning shutout the Rangers 2–0 in game seven, ending the Rangers' season and marking the first occasion the Rangers had ever lost a game seven at home in franchise history.

On June 27, 2015, the Rangers traded Carl Hagelin to the Anaheim Ducks, Cam Talbot and a draft pick to the Edmonton Oilers, and prospect Ryan Haggerty to the Chicago Blackhawks for goaltender Antti Raanta. On July 1, Glen Sather resigned as the general manager, with Jeff Gorton taking his place. On July 2, Martin St. Louis announced his retirement. The team then re-signed Jesper Fast, J. T. Miller, and Derek Stepan.

The Rangers started the 2015–16 season with a 14–2–2 record after 18 games, including a nine-game winning streak. The Rangers finished the season with 101 points. In the 2016 playoffs, the Rangers were eliminated in the first round by the Pittsburgh Penguins.

==== Rebuilding (2016–2020) ====
On July 18, 2016, the Rangers traded Derick Brassard and a 2018 seventh-round draft pick in exchange for Mika Zibanejad and a 2018 second-round draft pick. The team also signed Michael Grabner to a two-year deal and Jimmy Vesey to a two-year entry-level contract. The Rangers finished 2016–17 in fourth place in the Metropolitan Division with 102 points. In the first round of the 2017 Stanley Cup playoffs, they won their series with the Montreal Canadiens in six games. They lost in the second round to the Ottawa Senators in six games.

On June 14, 2017, the Rangers announced a buyout of Dan Girardi's contract. Just over a week later, the Rangers traded Derek Stepan and Antti Raanta to the Arizona Coyotes in exchange for a first-round draft pick (seventh overall) and former first-round pick Tony DeAngelo. Rangers' management also signed top free agent defenseman Kevin Shattenkirk to a four-year deal. By February 8, 2018, the team had a 25–24–5 record, leading the front office to issue a social media post to fans announcing the Rangers would be committing to a rebuild and may "lose some familiar faces" in the process. Rick Nash was traded the day before the 2018 NHL trade deadline to the Bruins for a 2018 first-round pick, a 2019 seventh-round pick, Matt Beleskey, Ryan Spooner and Ryan Lindgren. The following day, the Rangers traded captain Ryan McDonagh and J. T. Miller to the Tampa Bay Lightning for picks and prospects. With the team missing the playoffs for the first time since 2010 and placing last in the Metropolitan Division, head coach Vigneault was fired at the conclusion of the season.

On May 23, David Quinn was hired as the team's new head coach. During the offseason, Hayes, Vesey, Brady Skjei and Spooner all filed for salary arbitration and all were re-signed. Gorton and his team remained committed to a rebuild in the 2018–19 season; the Rangers traded away veteran players at the deadline, including Kevin Hayes and Mats Zuccarello, who was sent to the Dallas Stars in exchange for two draft picks.

The Rangers received the second overall pick in the 2019 NHL entry draft, and used it to select forward Kaapo Kakko. On May 17, 2019, former Ranger goaltender and broadcaster John Davidson resigned from his position as president of the Columbus Blue Jackets and returned to New York to become the organization's new president. The Rangers then acquired prospect Adam Fox from the Carolina Hurricanes for a pair of picks, and also traded with the Winnipeg Jets for defenseman Jacob Trouba. The team also signed free agent Artemi Panarin to a seven-year deal on July 1.

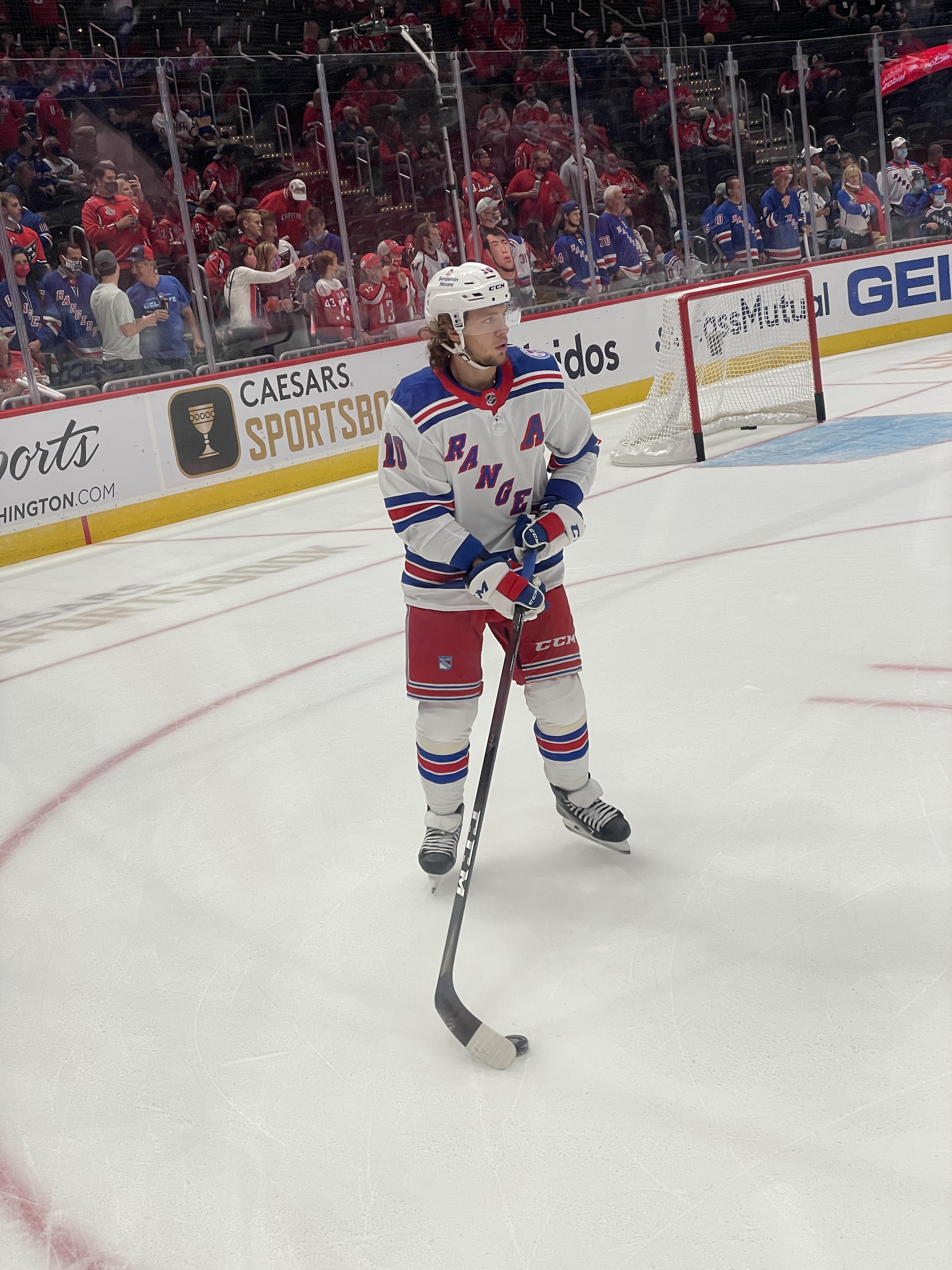
Artemi Panarin signed with the Rangers in July 2019.

The 2019–20 season saw improvement as Panarin earned a Hart Trophy nomination, Chris Kreider signed a seven-year contract extension, and Mika Zibanejad recorded a five-goal game against Washington on March 5 and ended up with 41 goals in 57 games played. By early March 2020, the Rangers were within striking distance of the second wild card position when the coronavirus pandemic halted the regular season. In May 2020, the league announced a 24-team playoff tournament to complete the season, where the Rangers were seeded 11th and faced the Carolina Hurricanes; the Hurricanes swept the Rangers. After being eliminated from the playoffs the Rangers were entered into the second phase of the NHL draft lottery where the team won the lottery and were awarded the first pick in the 2020 NHL entry draft, which Gorton used to select Alexis Lafrenière. Later in the offseason, the team traded veteran defenseman Marc Staal to the Red Wings.

In September 2020, the Rangers bought out the final year of Henrik Lundqvist's contract, ending his tenure in New York after 15 years.

=== The Drury years (2020–present) ===
==== Struggles, playoff return, and fourth Presidents' Trophy (2020–2024) ====
On January 31, 2021, defenseman Tony DeAngelo was placed on waivers following reports that he had an altercation with teammate Alexandar Georgiev following an overtime loss. According to The Athletic, his continued "maturity" issues, combined with a marked decline in his play, led the Rangers to put him on the market; there were no takers. In a game against the Washington Capitals on May 3, 2021, Capitals forward Tom Wilson cross-checked Pavel Buchnevich in the head and slammed Artemi Panarin into the ice, ending his season. Wilson, a repeat offender, was fined the league maximum of $5,000 for the incident. The Rangers organization released a statement expressing disappointment in this decision, calling head of player safety George Parros "unfit to continue in his current role". The NHL subsequently fined the Rangers $250,000 for their comments. Two days later, Rangers owner James Dolan fired president John Davidson and general manager Jeff Gorton. Despite the timing, Dolan stated the firings were not related to the Wilson incident and statement, citing "culture" issues within the organization. Chris Drury was then announced as the Rangers' new president and general manager. On May 12, Drury fired head coach David Quinn and replaced him with Gerard Gallant. Despite a tumultuous season, a major bright spot was the play of Adam Fox; he led NHL defensemen with 42 assists, finished second in points with 47, and won the James Norris Memorial Trophy.

The Rangers finished the 2021–22 season with a record of 52–24–6. For the third time in franchise history, the Rangers overcame a 3–1 series deficit, this time against the Pittsburgh Penguins in a first round matchup that concluded with a game-winning overtime goal from Artemi Panarin. After defeating the Carolina Hurricanes in seven games, they faced the back-to-back defending champions, the Tampa Bay Lightning, and lost the series in six games. Igor Shesterkin was named the Vezina Trophy winner following the season's conclusion. By the end of the following season, the Rangers had acquired Vladimir Tarasenko and Niko Mikkola from the St. Louis Blues and Patrick Kane from the Blackhawks, but lost to their river rivals, the New Jersey Devils, in the first round of the playoffs. Gallant was then fired as head coach and replaced with Peter Laviolette.

In the 2023–24 season, the Rangers clinched their fourth Presidents' Trophy, and in the first round of the 2024 playoffs swept the Washington Capitals. After defeating the Carolina Hurricanes in the second round, they lost to the eventual Stanley Cup champion Florida Panthers in the conference finals.

==== Retooling (2024–present) ====
The 2024–25 season was disastrous, as the Rangers became just the fourth team to miss the playoffs the year following a Presidents' Trophy win. Veteran players, such as Chris Kreider and Mika Zibanejad, received criticism throughout the season, captain Jacob Trouba, Kaapo Kakko, and Filip Chytil were traded, and Laviolette was fired at the end of the season. J. T. Miller was also reacquired during the Chytil trade.

On May 2, 2025, Mike Sullivan was named head coach. Later that offseason, Chris Kreider was traded to the Anaheim Ducks after a 13-year career with the Rangers. The following season would also prove to be disastrous, as by January 16, 2026, the team had a 20–22–6 record with a 5–14–3 home record. That day, Drury declared that the team would retool, stating, "it will be built around our core players and prospects." Near the trade deadline, the Rangers traded Panarin to the Los Angeles Kings for prospect Liam Greentree, a conditional third-round pick in 2026 and a fourth-round pick in 2028.

The Rangers finished the 2025–26 season with a 34–39–9 record, finishing last in the Eastern Conference and missing the playoffs for the second consecutive season. During the 2026 offseason, the team continued its retool by acquiring forward Pavel Dorofeyev, defensemen Sean Durzi and Marcus Pettersson, and several other players. The Rangers also selected Latvian defenseman Alberts Šmits fifth overall in the 2026 NHL entry draft.

== Uniforms ==
The classic Rangers sweater has been in use since the franchise's foundation, with several alterations along the way. The current blue uniform has the serifed word "RANGERS" in red and white drop shadow arranged diagonally, with red and white stripes on the sleeves and tail. Originally, the uniform was light blue, before it switched to a darker classic Rangers "Broadway Blue" in 1929. In addition, the original versions neither had a drop shadow nor were serifed. During the 1946–47 season, the word "RANGERS" was arranged in an arch form above the sweater number. It adopted its current form the next season, along with dropshadowed numbers, except for a brief period where the city name was used, a tie-down collar was not used and the tail and sleeve stripes were separated by thin blue stripes. Red pants have been used with the uniform since the 1929–30 season.

The white jerseys were first unveiled in the 1951–52 season. The serifed word "RANGERS" is also arranged diagonally, but in blue with red drop shadow. The white sweaters, with minor changes such as a tie-down collar and arched player names, have remained virtually unchanged since.

During the tenure of general manager John Ferguson Sr., he sought to modernize the Rangers sweater by featuring rounded numbers, a darker shade of blue and the shield logo, which was unveiled in the 1976–77 season. A blue and red stripe (white and red stripe in the blue sweaters) extends from the yoke to the sleeves, while blue pants were used. However, it proved unpopular with the fans, and following the 1977–78 season it was replaced by an updated version of their classic uniforms. Ferguson used this similar design when he became general manager of the original Winnipeg Jets.

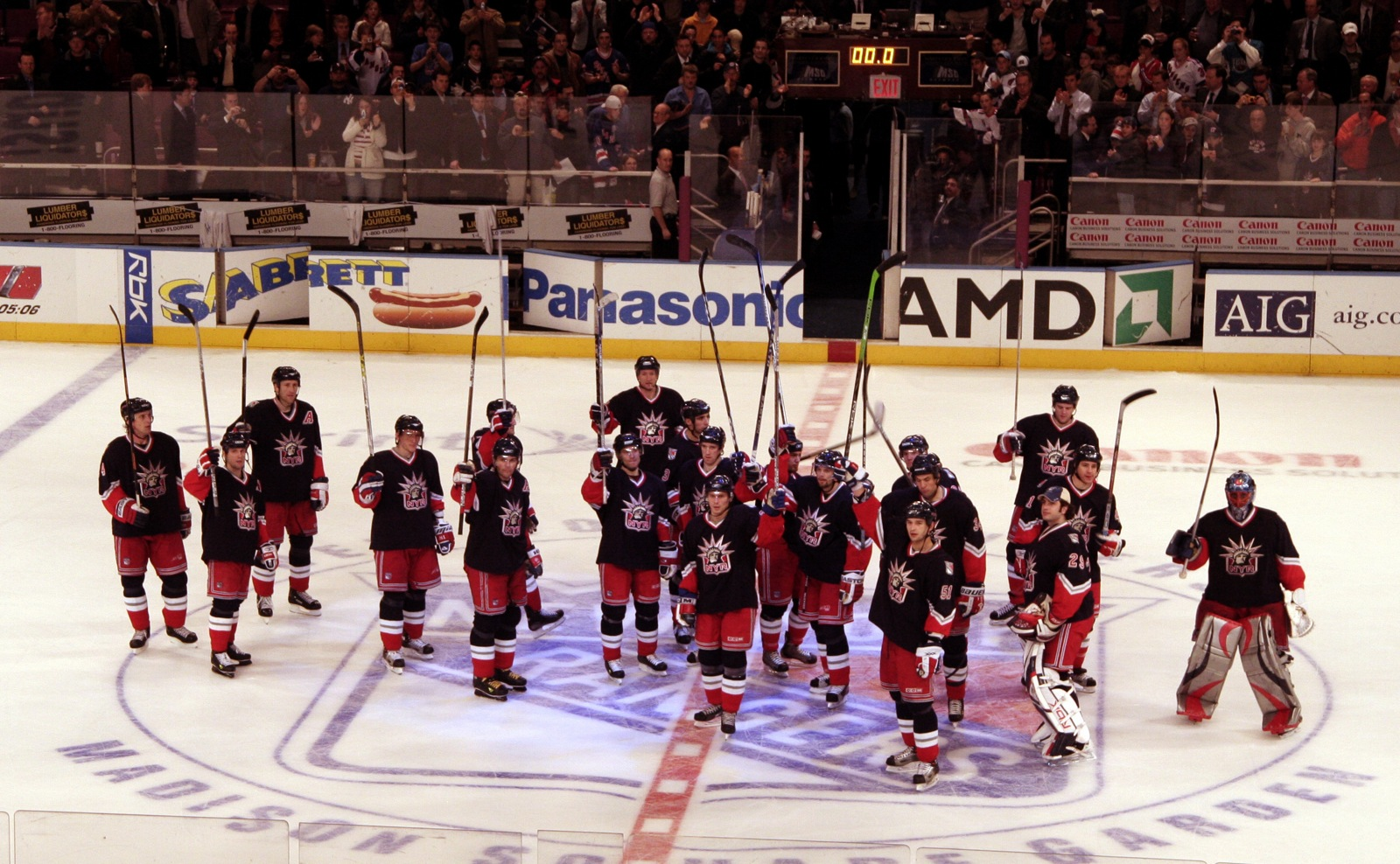
From 1996 to 2007 the Rangers' alternate jersey featured the head of the Statue of Liberty with the team abbreviation below it.

The modernized classic uniforms introduced in 1978 featured some subtle changes. Both jerseys featured a V-neck collar in a red-white-red pattern, and bolder stripes on the sleeves and waistline. On the blue jersey, the red and white stripes were separated by thin blue stripes, along with the waistline stripes being raised above the hemline so that the patterns on both jerseys matched. From 1978 to 1987, the blue jersey (then the road jersey) featured "NEW YORK" diagonally across the front instead of the traditional "RANGERS" wordmark, similar to their 2010s heritage alternate jerseys. In 1997, the Rangers reverted the blue jersey's design, restoring the old striping pattern, and becoming the first team to re-introduce lace-up collars. The design was carried over to the Reebok Edge template in 2007.

On October 7, 2001, the Rangers wore a modified version of their blue jerseys in a home game against the Buffalo Sabres. This design combined the current/traditional striping with the "NEW YORK" wordmark of the 1978–1987 uniforms. The uniforms were worn in the wake of the September 11 attacks.

The Rangers previously had a navy alternate jersey featuring the head of the Statue of Liberty with the team abbreviation (NYR) below in a futuristic script. Silver was used as an accent color, but the player names and numbers retained the same color schemes as the regular jerseys, except for a darker shade of blue. Other than a white version used in the 1998–99 season, this jersey was used from 1996 to 2007.

During the 2010–11 season, the Rangers debuted a heritage blue jersey as their new alternate uniform. The jersey featured a darker shade of blue, as well as a cream trim. Unlike the regular jerseys, the font of the alternate was sans-serif and did not feature a drop-shadow, much like the original Rangers jersey. The Rangers wore the jerseys at home on Saturdays and when they played against Original Six teams.

In the 2012 Winter Classic, the Rangers wore a cream jersey combining classic and current styles. A different version of the shield logo was used, while the player names were arranged in a straight line. The stripes were also lessened, giving it a minimalist, vintage look, as most Winter Classic jerseys are.

For the 2014 Stadium Series, the Rangers used white jerseys with the city name in navy, silver and red. In addition, they feature diagonal stripes and sleeve numbers, and enlarged numbers on the back to make them more readable to spectators. The chrome version of the shield logo is placed in the left shoulder. Like the Winter Classic sweaters, player names are in a straight position.

The 2018 Winter Classic saw the Rangers wear a navy jersey with a combination of elements from prior uniform designs. The striping design was inspired from their current uniforms, while the white "RANGERS" wordmark was a nod from the team's late 1920s jerseys. A white silhouette of the Rangers' shield logo contained either the abbreviation "N.Y." or the alternate captain "A" and captain "C" designations. Player names are arranged in a straight position.

During the 2020–21 season, the Rangers released a "Reverse Retro" alternate uniform in collaboration with Adidas. The uniform featured the "Lady Liberty" design worn from 1996 to 2007, but with a few changes in the striping. This same design was again used for their 2022–23 "Reverse Retro" uniform, but the lighter Broadway Blue served as the base color while the lower sleeves were recolored red with white and navy stripes.

Introduced in the 2023–24 season, the Rangers began wearing a new third jersey, bringing back the shield logo as the main crest for the first time since the 1976–1978 redesign. The navy blue-based jersey features thin white, red and Broadway blue stripes on the sleeves, waist and socks, along with white letters. This uniform was deactivated during the 2025–26 season in favor of their centennial edition alternate (see below), but returned in the 2026–27 season.

For the 2024 Stadium Series, the Rangers wore white jerseys with an enlarged "NYR" diagonal lettering in red with blue drop shadows. Enlarged numbers also employ the same color scheme as the "NYR" wordmark, along with thick alternating blue and red sleeve stripes.

The Rangers unveiled their centennial edition jersey ahead of the 2025–26 season. Based on their inaugural 1926–27 uniform, it featured a light blue base with the traditional red and cream stripes, and cream letters featuring the sans-serif "RANGERS" written diagonally in white. The 100th anniversary patch was placed on the left shoulder, and a sponsor patch featuring sports and entertainment brand "Game 7" was placed on the right shoulder. A cream variation with a diagonal sans-serif "NEW YORK" wordmark serves as their uniform for the 2026 NHL Winter Classic.

During the 2026–27 season, the Rangers unveiled a "Hometown Remix" uniform as a nod to the city's first responders. The predominantly navy blue jersey featured the diagonal "NEW YORK" crest similar to their 1978–1987 road uniform, along with the alternate "Lady Liberty" crest near the left shoulder and the captain patches written like a nameplate used by New York City's police and fire departments.

== Season-by-season record ==
This is a partial list of the last five seasons completed by the Rangers. For the full season-by-season history, see List of New York Rangers seasons.

Note: GP = Games played, W = Wins, L = Losses, T = Ties, OTL = Overtime/shootout losses, Pts = Points, GF = Goals for, GA = Goals against

| Season | GP | W | L | OTL | Pts | GF | GA | Finish | Playoffs |
|---|---|---|---|---|---|---|---|---|---|
| 2021–22 | 82 | 52 | 24 | 6 | 110 | 254 | 207 | 2nd, Metropolitan | Lost in conference finals, 2–4 (Lightning) |
| 2022–23 | 82 | 47 | 22 | 13 | 107 | 277 | 219 | 3rd, Metropolitan | Lost in first round, 3–4 (Devils) |
| 2023–24 | 82 | 55 | 23 | 4 | 114 | 282 | 229 | 1st, Metropolitan | Lost in conference finals, 2–4 (Panthers) |
| 2024–25 | 82 | 39 | 36 | 7 | 85 | 256 | 255 | 5th, Metropolitan | Did not qualify |
| 2025–26 | 82 | 34 | 39 | 9 | 77 | 238 | 250 | 8th, Metropolitan | Did not qualify |

== Players and personnel ==
=== Current roster ===
Updated November 16, 2026

| No. | Nat | Player | Pos | S/G | Age | Acquired | Birthplace |
|---|---|---|---|---|---|---|---|
| 28 | (Denmark) | Oliver Bjorkstrand | RW | R | 31 | 2026 | Herning, Denmark |
| 49 | (Czech Republic) | Jaroslav Chmelař | RW | R | 23 | 2021 | Nové Město nad Metují, Czech Republic |
| 50 | (Canada) | Will Cuylle | LW | L | 24 | 2020 | Toronto, Ontario |
| 16 | (Russia) | Pavel Dorofeyev | RW | L | 26 | 2026 | Nizhny Tagil, Russia |
| 5 | (Canada) | Sean Durzi | D | R | 28 | 2026 | Toronto, Ontario |
| 23 | (United States) | Adam Fox (A) | D | R | 28 | 2019 | Jericho, New York |
| 33 | (Canada) | Dylan Garand | G | L | 24 | 2020 | Victoria, British Columbia |
| 44 | (Russia) | Vladislav Gavrikov | D | L | 31 | 2025 | Yaroslavl, Russia |
| 15 | (Canada) | Glenn Gawdin | C | R | 29 | 2026 | Richmond, British Columbia |
| 43 | (United States) | Luke Glendening | C | R | 37 | 2026 | East Grand Rapids, Michigan |
| 24 | (Canada) | Tye Kartye | LW | L | 25 | 2026 | Kingston, Ontario |
| 70 | (Finland) | Joonas Korpisalo | G | L | 32 | 2026 | Pori, Finland |
| 42 | (United States) | Noah Laba | C | R | 23 | 2022 | Northville, Michigan |
| 13 | (Canada) | Alexis Lafrenière | LW | L | 25 | 2020 | Saint-Eustache, Quebec |
| 10 | (United States) | J. T. Miller (C) | C | L | 33 | 2025 | East Palestine, Ohio |
| 60 | (United States) | Scott Morrow | D | R | 24 | 2025 | Darien, Connecticut |
| 94 | (United States) | Gabe Perreault | RW | R | 21 | 2023 | Sherbrooke, Quebec |
| 26 | (Sweden) | Marcus Pettersson | D | L | 30 | 2026 | Skellefteå, Sweden |
| 14 | (Canada) | Taylor Raddysh | RW | R | 28 | 2025 | Caledon, Ontario |
| 73 | (Canada) | Matt Rempe | C | R | 24 | 2020 | Calgary, Alberta |
| 29 | (Canada) | Matthew Robertson | D | L | 25 | 2019 | Edmonton, Alberta |
| — | (United States) | Max Sasson | C | L | 26 | 2026 | Birmingham, Michigan |
| 4 | (Canada) | Braden Schneider | D | R | 25 | 2020 | Prince Albert, Saskatchewan |
| 31 | (Russia) | Igor Shesterkin | G | L | 30 | 2014 | Moscow, Russia |
| 38 | (Slovakia) | Adam Sýkora | LW | L | 22 | 2022 | Piešťany, Slovakia |
| 12 | (Latvia) | Alberts Šmits | D | L | 18 | 2026 | Valmiera, Latvia |
| 17 | (Finland) | Eeli Tolvanen | RW | L | 27 | 2026 | Vihti, Finland |
| 90 | (Canada) | Joe Veleno | C | L | 26 | 2026 | Montreal, Quebec |
| 93 | (Sweden) | Mika Zibanejad (A) | C | R | 33 | 2016 | Huddinge, Sweden |

=== Team captains ===
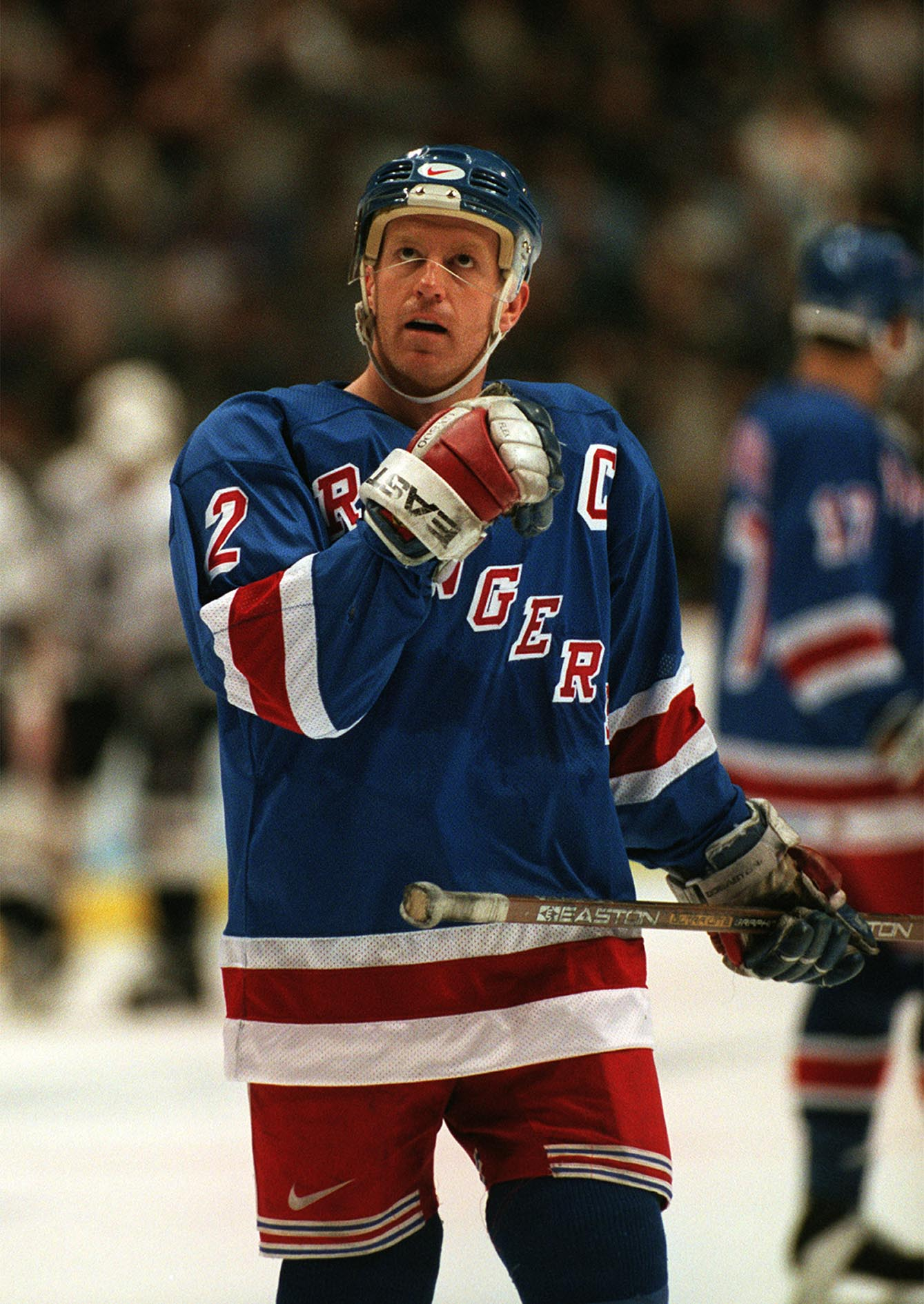
Brian Leetch was the 23rd captain in Rangers history, maintaining the position from 1997 to 2000.

- Bill Cook, 1926–1937
- Art Coulter, 1937–1942
- Ott Heller, 1942–1945
- Neil Colville, 1945–1948
- Buddy O'Connor, 1949–1950
- Frank Eddolls, 1950–1951
- Allan Stanley, 1951–1953
- Don Raleigh, 1953–1955
- Harry Howell, 1955–1957
- George Sullivan, 1957–1961
- Andy Bathgate, 1961–1964
- Camille Henry, 1964–1965
- Bob Nevin, 1965–1971
- Vic Hadfield, 1971–1974
- Brad Park, 1974–1975
- Phil Esposito, 1975–1978
- Dave Maloney, 1978–1980
- Walt Tkaczuk, 1980–1981
- Barry Beck, 1981–1986
- Ron Greschner, 1986–1987
- Kelly Kisio, 1987–1991
- Mark Messier, 1991–1997
- Brian Leetch, 1997–2000
- Mark Messier, 2000–2004
- Jaromír Jágr, 2006–2008
- Chris Drury, 2008–2011
- Ryan Callahan, 2011–2014
- Ryan McDonagh, 2014–2018
- Jacob Trouba, 2022–2024
- J. T. Miller, 2025–present

=== General managers ===
The current general manager is Chris Drury who had been named on May 5, 2021.

=== Head coaches ===
The current head coach is Mike Sullivan who was hired on May 2, 2025.

== Team and league honors ==
=== Awards and trophies ===
The following lists the league awards which have been won by the Rangers team and its players and alumni:

Stanley Cup

- 1927–28, 1932–33, 1939–40, 1993–94

Victoria Cup

- 2008 Victoria Cup

Presidents' Trophy

- 1991–92, 1993–94, 2014–15, 2023–24

Prince of Wales Trophy

- 1931–32, 1941–42, 1993–94, 2013–14

O'Brien Cup

- 1949–50

Bill Masterton Memorial Trophy

- Jean Ratelle: 1970–71
- Rod Gilbert: 1975–76
- Anders Hedberg: 1984–85
- Adam Graves: 2000–01
- Dominic Moore: 2013–14

Calder Memorial Trophy

- Kilby MacDonald: 1939–40
- Grant Warwick: 1941–42
- Edgar Laprade: 1945–46
- Pentti Lund: 1948–49
- Gump Worsley: 1952–53
- Camille Henry: 1953–54
- Steve Vickers: 1972–73
- Brian Leetch: 1988–89

Conn Smythe Trophy

- Brian Leetch: 1993–94

Hart Memorial Trophy

- Buddy O'Connor: 1947–48
- Chuck Rayner: 1949–50
- Andy Bathgate: 1958–59
- Mark Messier: 1991–92

James Norris Memorial Trophy

- Doug Harvey: 1961–62
- Harry Howell: 1966–67
- Brian Leetch: 1991–92, 1996–97
- Adam Fox: 2020–21

King Clancy Memorial Trophy

- Adam Graves: 1993–94

Lady Byng Memorial Trophy

- Frank Boucher: 1927–28, 1928–29, 1929–30, 1930–31, 1932–33, 1933–34, 1934–35
- Clint Smith: 1938–39
- Buddy O'Connor: 1947–48
- Edgar Laprade: 1949–50
- Andy Hebenton: 1956–57
- Camille Henry: 1957–58
- Jean Ratelle: 1971–72, 1975–76
- Wayne Gretzky: 1998–99

Lester Patrick Trophy

- John Kilpatrick and Tommy Lockhart: 1967–68
- William M. Jennings and Terry Sawchuk: 1970–71
- Murray Murdoch: 1973–74
- Bill Chadwick: 1974–75
- Phil Esposito: 1977–78
- Fred Shero: 1979–80
- Emile Francis: 1981–82
- Lynn Patrick: 1988–89
- Rod Gilbert: 1990–91
- Frank Boucher: 1992–93
- Brian Mullen: 1994–95
- Craig Patrick: 1999–2000
- Herb Brooks and Larry Pleau: 2001–02
- John Davidson: 2003–04
- Red Berenson and Marcel Dionne: 2005–06
- Brian Leetch and John Halligan: 2006–07
- Mark Messier and Mike Richter: 2008–09
- Bob Crocker: 2014–15
- Jack Blatherwick: 2018–19

Lester B. Pearson Award

- Jean Ratelle: 1971–72
- Mark Messier: 1991–92
- Jaromír Jágr: 2005–06

NHL Plus-Minus Award

- Michal Rozsíval: 2005–06 (shared with Wade Redden of the Ottawa Senators)

Vezina Trophy

- Dave Kerr: 1939–40
- Eddie Giacomin and Gilles Villemure: 1970–71
- John Vanbiesbrouck: 1985–86
- Henrik Lundqvist: 2011–12
- Igor Shesterkin: 2021–22

=== First-round draft picks ===
- 1963: Al Osborne (4th overall)
- 1964: Bob Graham (3rd overall)
- 1965: André Veilleux (1st overall)
- 1966: Brad Park (2nd overall)
- 1967: Bob Dickson (6th overall)
- 1969: André Dupont (8th overall), Pierre Jarry (12th)
- 1970: Norm Gratton (11th overall)
- 1971: Steve Vickers (10th overall), Steve Durbano (13th)
- 1972: Al Blanchard (10th overall), Bob MacMillan (15th)
- 1973: Rick Middleton (14th overall)
- 1974: Dave Maloney (14th overall)
- 1975: Wayne Dillon (12th overall)
- 1976: Don Murdoch (6th overall)
- 1977: Lucien DeBlois (8th overall), Ron Duguay (13th)
- 1979: Doug Sulliman (13th overall)
- 1980: Jim Malone (14th overall)
- 1981: James Patrick (9th overall)
- 1982: Chris Kontos (15th overall)
- 1983: Dave Gagner (12th overall)
- 1984: Terry Carkner (14th overall)
- 1985: Ulf Dahlén (7th overall)
- 1986: Brian Leetch (9th overall)
- 1987: Jayson More (10th overall)
- 1989: Steven Rice (20th overall)
- 1990: Michael Stewart (13th overall)
- 1991: Alexei Kovalev (15th overall)
- 1992: Peter Ferraro (24th overall)
- 1993: Niklas Sundström (8th overall)
- 1994: Dan Cloutier (26th overall)
- 1996: Jeff Brown (22nd overall)
- 1997: Stefan Cherneski (19th overall)
- 1998: Manny Malhotra (7th overall)
- 1999: Pavel Brendl (4th overall), Jamie Lundmark (9th)
- 2001: Dan Blackburn (10th overall)
- 2003: Hugh Jessiman (12th overall)
- 2004: Al Montoya (6th overall), Lauri Korpikoski (19th)
- 2005: Marc Staal (12th overall)
- 2006: Bob Sanguinetti (21st overall)
- 2007: Alexei Cherepanov (17th overall)
- 2008: Michael Del Zotto (20th overall)
- 2009: Chris Kreider (19th overall)
- 2010: Dylan McIlrath (10th overall)
- 2011: J. T. Miller (15th overall)
- 2012: Brady Skjei (28th overall)
- 2017: Lias Andersson (7th overall), Filip Chytil (21st)
- 2018: Vitali Kravtsov (9th overall), K'Andre Miller (22nd), Nils Lundkvist (28th)
- 2019: Kaapo Kakko (2nd overall)
- 2020: Alexis Lafrenière (1st overall), Braden Schneider (19th)
- 2021: Brennan Othmann (16th overall)
- 2023: Gabe Perreault (23rd overall)
- 2024: E. J. Emery (30th overall)
- 2026: Alberts Šmits (5th overall)

=== Hall of Famers ===
The New York Rangers acknowledge an affiliation with a number of inductees to the Hockey Hall of Fame. Rangers inductees include 53 former players and ten builders of the sport. The nine individuals recognized as builders by the Hall of Fame includes former Rangers executives, general managers, head coaches, and owners. In addition to players and builders, several broadcasters were also awarded the Foster Hewitt Memorial Award from the Hockey Hall of Fame. Sal Messina, a color commentator, was the first Rangers broadcaster to be awarded the Foster Hewitt Memorial Award. Other Rangers broadcasters awarded the Foster Hewitt Memorial Award include John Davidson (awarded in 2009), and Sam Rosen (awarded in 2016).

Players

- Glenn Anderson
- Andy Bathgate
- Doug Bentley
- Max Bentley
- Frank Boucher
- Johnny Bower
- Pavel Bure
- Neil Colville
- Bill Cook
- Bun Cook
- Art Coulter
- Marcel Dionne
- Dick Duff
- Phil Esposito
- Bill Gadsby
- Mike Gartner
- Bernie Geoffrion
- Eddie Giacomin
- Rod Gilbert
- Wayne Gretzky
- Doug Harvey
- Bryan Hextall
- Tim Horton
- Harry Howell
- Ching Johnson
- Jari Kurri
- Guy Lafleur
- Pat LaFontaine
- Edgar Laprade
- Brian Leetch
- Eric Lindros
- Kevin Lowe
- Harry Lumley
- Henrik Lundqvist
- Mark Messier
- Howie Morenz
- Vaclav Nedomansky
- Buddy O'Connor
- Brad Park
- Lynn Patrick
- Jacques Plante
- Babe Pratt
- Jean Ratelle
- Chuck Rayner
- Luc Robitaille
- Earl Seibert
- Brendan Shanahan
- Allan Stanley
- Babe Siebert
- Clint Smith
- Terry Sawchuk
- Martin St. Louis
- Gump Worsley
- Sergei Zubov

Builders

- Herb Brooks
- Colin Campbell
- Emile Francis
- William M. Jennings
- Roger Neilson
- Craig Patrick
- Lester Patrick
- Lynn Patrick
- Glen Sather
- Fred Shero

=== Retired numbers ===
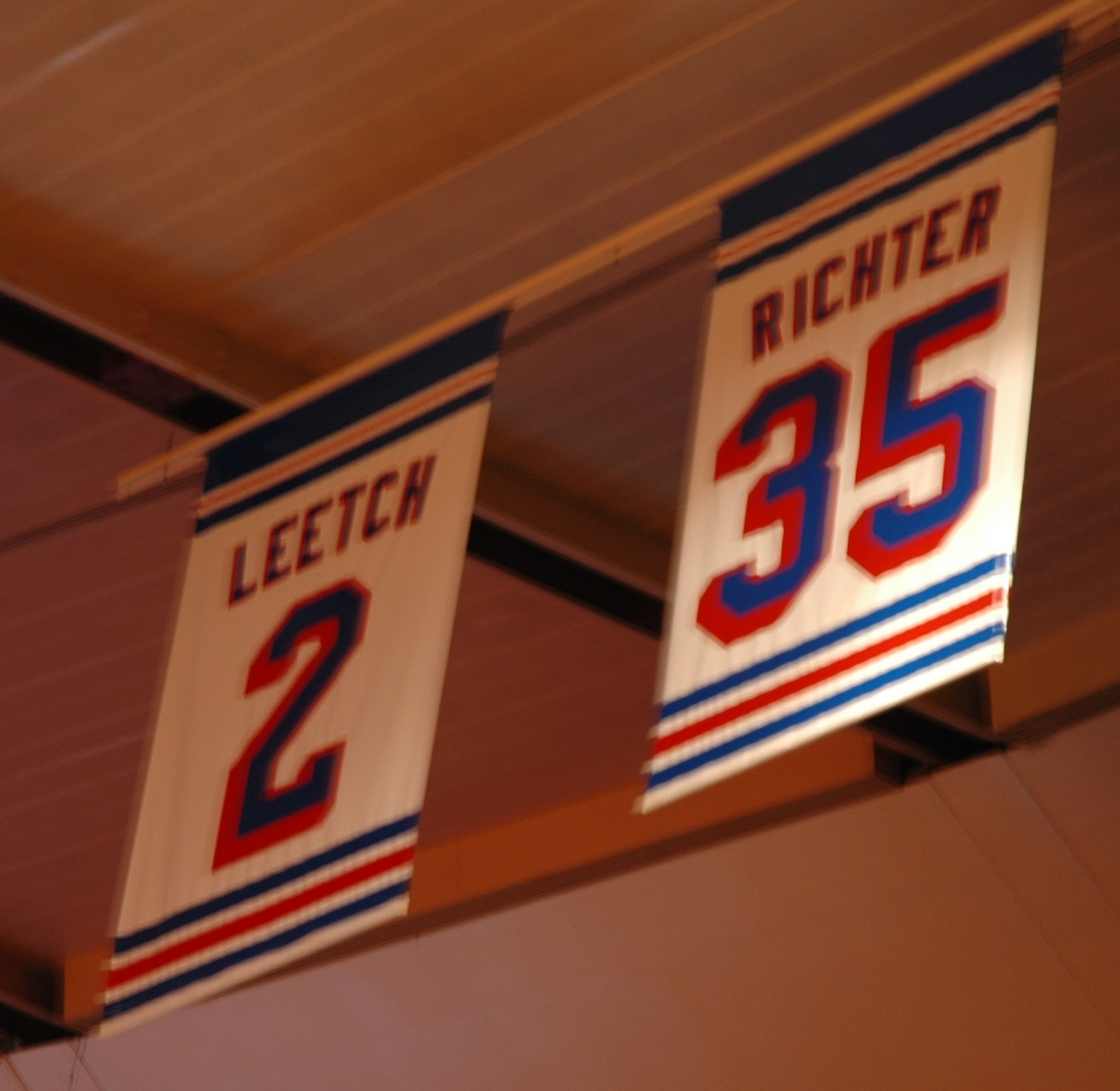
Retired numbers hang from the rafters of Madison Square Garden.

The Rangers have retired nine numbers for eleven players in their history, and the NHL retired Wayne Gretzky's No. 99 for all its member teams at the 2000 NHL All-Star Game.

New York Rangers retired numbers
| No. | Player | Position | Career | Date No. retired |
|---|---|---|---|---|
| 1 | Eddie Giacomin | G | 1965–1976 | March 15, 1989 |
| 2 | Brian Leetch | D | 1987–2004 | January 24, 2008 |
| 3 | Harry Howell | D | 1952–1969 | February 22, 2009 |
| 7 | Rod Gilbert | RW | 1960–1978 | October 14, 1979 |
| 9 ^{1} | Andy Bathgate | RW | 1952–1964 | February 22, 2009 |
| 9 ^{1} | Adam Graves | LW | 1991–2001 | February 3, 2009 |
| 11^{1} | Vic Hadfield | LW | 1959–1974 | December 2, 2018 |
| 11^{1} | Mark Messier | C | 1991–1997; 2000–2004 | January 12, 2006 |
| 19 | Jean Ratelle | C | 1960–1976 | February 25, 2018 |
| 30 | Henrik Lundqvist | G | 2005–2020 | January 28, 2022 |
| 35 | Mike Richter | G | 1990–2003 | February 4, 2004 |

Notes:

- ^{1} The number was retired in honor of two different players.

== Franchise records ==
=== Scoring leaders ===
These are the top-ten-point-scorers in franchise history. Figures are updated after each completed NHL regular season.

- * – current Rangers player

Note: Pos = Position; GP = Games played; G = Goals; A = Assists; Pts = Points; P/G = Points per game average

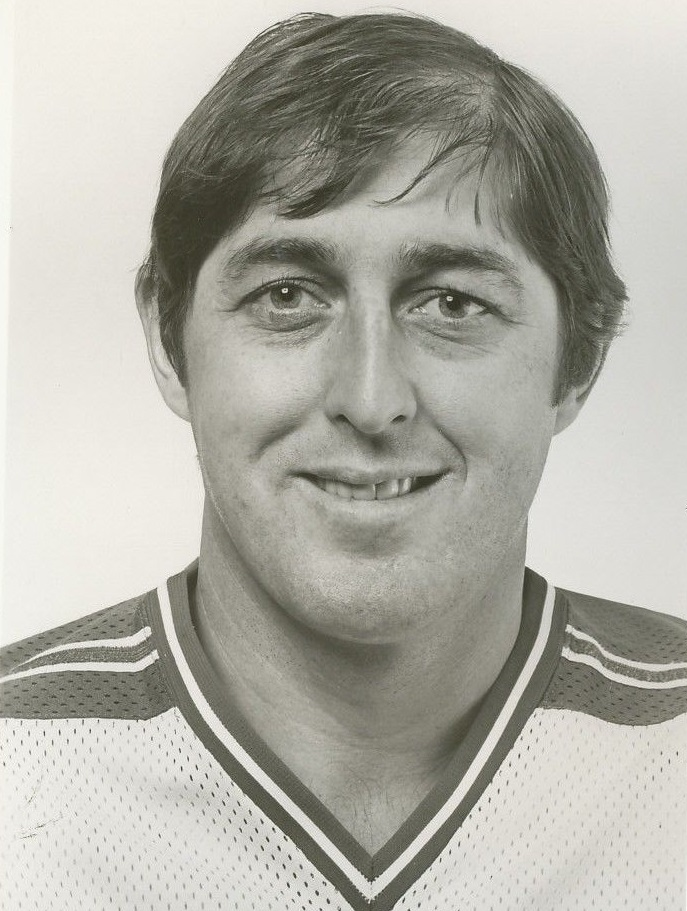
Playing with the Rangers from 1968 to 1981, Walt Tkaczuk scored the sixth most points in the franchise (678 points).

Points
| Player | Pos | GP | G | A | Pts | P/G |
|---|---|---|---|---|---|---|
| Rod Gilbert | RW | 1,065 | 406 | 615 | 1,021 | .96 |
| Brian Leetch | D | 1,129 | 240 | 741 | 981 | .87 |
| Jean Ratelle | C | 861 | 336 | 481 | 817 | .95 |
| Andy Bathgate | RW | 719 | 272 | 457 | 729 | 1.01 |
| Mark Messier | C | 698 | 250 | 441 | 691 | .99 |
| Walt Tkaczuk | C | 945 | 227 | 451 | 678 | .72 |
| Mika Zibanejad* | C | 730 | 284 | 383 | 667 | .91 |
| Ron Greschner | D | 981 | 179 | 431 | 610 | .62 |
| Artemi Panarin | LW | 482 | 205 | 402 | 607 | 1.26 |
| Steve Vickers | LW | 698 | 246 | 340 | 586 | .85 |

Goals
| Player | Pos | G |
|---|---|---|
| Rod Gilbert | RW | 406 |
| Jean Ratelle | C | 336 |
| Chris Kreider | LW | 326 |
| Mika Zibanejad* | C | 284 |
| Adam Graves | LW | 280 |
| Andy Bathgate | RW | 272 |
| Vic Hadfield | LW | 262 |
| Camille Henry | LW | 256 |
| Mark Messier | C | 250 |
| Steve Vickers | LW | 246 |

Assists
| Player | Pos | A |
|---|---|---|
| Brian Leetch | D | 741 |
| Rod Gilbert | RW | 615 |
| Jean Ratelle | C | 481 |
| Andy Bathgate | RW | 457 |
| Walt Tkaczuk | C | 451 |
| Mark Messier | C | 441 |
| Ron Greschner | D | 431 |
| Artemi Panarin | LW | 402 |
| Mika Zibanejad* | C | 383 |
| James Patrick | D | 363 |

=== Goaltending leaders ===
These goaltenders rank in the top ten in franchise history for wins. Figures are updated after each completed NHL season.

- * – current Rangers player

Note: GP = Games played; W = Wins; L = Losses; T/O = Ties/Overtime losses; GA = Goal against; GAA = Goals against average; SA = Shots against; SV% = Save percentage; SO = Shutouts

Goaltenders
| Player | GP | W | L | T/O | GA | GAA | SA | SV% | SO |
|---|---|---|---|---|---|---|---|---|---|
| Henrik Lundqvist | 887 | 459 | 310 | 96 | 2,101 | 2.43 | 25,610 | .918 | 64 |
| Mike Richter | 666 | 301 | 258 | 73 | 1,840 | 2.89 | 19,219 | .904 | 24 |
| Eddie Giacomin | 539 | 267 | 172 | 89 | 1,438 | 2.74 | 15,130 | .905 | 49 |
| Gump Worsley | 582 | 204 | 271 | 101 | 1,758 | 3.04 | 16,150 | — | 24 |
| John Vanbiesbrouck | 449 | 200 | 177 | 47 | 1,457 | 3.45 | 13,190 | .890 | 16 |
| Igor Shesterkin* | 325 | 187 | 107 | 28 | 796 | 2.52 | 9,534 | .917 | 22 |
| Dave Kerr | 324 | 157 | 110 | 57 | 697 | 2.07 | — | — | 40 |
| Chuck Rayner | 377 | 123 | 179 | 73 | 1,118 | 2.98 | — | — | 24 |
| Gilles Villemure | 184 | 98 | 53 | 23 | 457 | 2.62 | 4,773 | .904 | 12 |
| John Davidson | 222 | 93 | 90 | 25 | 742 | 3.58 | 6,380 | .884 | 7 |

=== Single-season records ===
- Points – Jaromír Jágr, 123 (2005–06)
- Goals – Jaromír Jágr, 54 (2005–06)
- Assists – Brian Leetch, 80 (1991–92)
- Power play goals – Chris Kreider, 26 (2021–22)
- Power play points – Brian Leetch, 53 (1993–94)
- Power play assists – Brian Leetch, 45 (1990–91)
- Short-handed goals – Theoren Fleury, 7 (2000–01)
- Short-handed points – Mark Messier, 11 (1996–97)
- Short-handed assists – Mark Messier, 7 (1993–94)
- Even strength goals – Jean Ratelle, 40 (1971–72)
- Even strength points – Jean Ratelle, 82 (1971–72)
- Even strength assists – 46, Mark Messier (1991–92), Wayne Gretzky (1996–97), and Artemi Panarin (2019–20)
- Game-winning goals – Chris Kreider, 11 (2021–22)
- Overtime goals – 3, Tomas Sandström (1986–87), Adam Graves (1998–99), Marián Gáborík (2011–12), and J. T. Miller (2025–26)
- Empty net goals – Michael Grabner, 7 (2017–18)
- Plus/minus – Brad Park, +63 (1971–72); Ron Greschner, –50 (1975–76)
- Shots on goal – Jaromír Jágr, 368 (2005–06)
- Penalty minutes – Troy Mallette, 305 (1989–90)
- Hat-tricks – Tomas Sandström, 4 (1986–87)
- Goaltending wins – Mike Richter, 42 (1993–94)
- Goaltending shutouts – John Ross Roach, 13 (1928–1929)
- Goaltending saves – Gump Worsley, 2,376 (1955–1956)

== See also ==
- Emile Francis Award
- Ice Hockey in Harlem

| Preceded by Ottawa Senators | Stanley Cup champions 1927–28 | Succeeded by Boston Bruins |
| Preceded by Toronto Maple Leafs | Stanley Cup champions 1932–33 | Succeeded by Chicago Black Hawks |
| Preceded by Boston Bruins | Stanley Cup champions 1939–40 | Succeeded by Boston Bruins |
| Preceded by Montreal Canadiens | Stanley Cup champions 1993–94 | Succeeded by New Jersey Devils |
