= List of New York Rangers records =

This is a list of franchise records for the New York Rangers of the National Hockey League.

Bold indicates active.

== Team records ==
=== Single season ===
Stat	Total	Season
Most points	114	2023–24
Most wins	55	2023–24
Most losses	44	1984–85
Most ties	21	1950–51
Most wins in regulation	49	1993–94
Most shootouts played	17	2007–08
Most shootout wins	10	2008–09
Most shootout losses	9	2007–08
Most goals for	321	1991–92
Most goals against	345	1984–85
Most shootout goals	19	2008–09
Most shootout goals against	16	2007–08
Most assists	540	1988–89
Most scoring points	855	1978–79
Most penalty minutes	2021	1989–90
Most penalties taken	718	1995–96
Most shutouts	13	1928–29
Most consecutive shutouts	4	1927–28
Most times shut-out	10	1928–29
Most comeback wins	28	2023–24
Most empty net goals	19	2023–24
Most hat-tricks	10	1986–87
Most 40-goal scorers	3	1971–72
Most 30-goal scorers	5	1991–92
Most 100-point scorers	2	1971–72, 1991–92
Most 90-point scorers	3	1971–72
Most 80-point scorers	3	1971–72, 1974–75, 1991–92, 1995–96
Fewest points	17	1943–44
Fewest wins	6	1943–44
Fewest losses	11	1939–40
Fewest ties	2	1941–42
Fewest wins in regulation	6	1943–44
Fewest shootouts played	1	2024–25
Fewest shootout wins	1	2019–20, 2020–21, 2024–25
Fewest shootout losses	0	2024–25
Fewest goals for	72	1928–29
Fewest goals against	65	1928–29
Fewest shootout goals	1	2024–25
Fewest shootout goals against	0	2024–25
Fewest assists	45	1926–27
Fewest scoring points	140	1926–27
Fewest penalty minutes	253	1943–44
Fewest penalties taken	113	1943–44
Highest points percentage	0.699%	1970–71, 1971–72
Highest wins percentage	0.671%	2023–24
Highest shootout wins percentage	1.000%	2024–25
Highest goals for per game	4.06	1971–72
Highest goals against per game	6.2	1943–44
Lowest points percentage	0.17%	1943–44
Lowest wins percentage	0.12%	1943–44
Lowest shootout wins percentage	0.333%	2019–20, 2020–21
Lowest goals for per game	1.64	1928–29
Lowest goals against per game	1.48	1928–29

== All-time regular season leaders ==
=== Most goals ===
- Rod Gilbert – 406
- Jean Ratelle – 336
- Chris Kreider – 326
- **Mika Zibanejad – 284**
- Adam Graves – 280
- Andy Bathgate – 272
- Vic Hadfield – 262
- Camille Henry – 256
- Mark Messier – 250
- Steve Vickers – 246

=== Most points ===
- Rod Gilbert – 1021
- Brian Leetch – 981
- Jean Ratelle – 817
- Andy Bathgate – 729
- Mark Messier – 691
- Walt Tkaczuk – 678
- **Mika Zibanejad – 667**
- Ron Greschner – 610
- Artemi Panarin – 607
- Steve Vickers – 586

=== Most assists ===
- Brian Leetch – 741
- Rod Gilbert – 615
- Jean Ratelle – 481
- Andy Bathgate – 457
- Walt Tkaczuk – 451
- Mark Messier – 441
- Ron Greschner – 431
- Artemi Panarin – 402
- **Mika Zibanejad – 383**
- James Patrick – 363

=== Most power play goals ===
- **Mika Zibanejad – 124**
- Camille Henry – 116
- Chris Kreider – 116
- Rod Gilbert – 108
- Brian Leetch – 106
- Adam Graves – 100
- Vic Hadfield – 83
- Phil Esposito – 82
- Jean Ratelle – 82
- Mark Messier – 72

=== Most power play points ===
- Brian Leetch – 514
- Rod Gilbert – 323
- **Mika Zibanejad – 248**
- James Patrick – 237
- Mark Messier – 232
- Jean Ratelle – 223
- Ron Greschner – 222
- Andy Bathgate – 221
- Camille Henry – 210
- Artemi Panarin – 202

=== Most power play assists ===
- Brian Leetch – 408
- Rod Gilbert – 215
- James Patrick – 187
- Ron Greschner – 171
- Andy Bathgate – 162
- Mark Messier – 160
- **Adam Fox – 157**
- Artemi Panarin – 155
- Jean Ratelle – 141
- **Mika Zibanejad – 124**

=== Most even strength goals ===
- Rod Gilbert – 298
- Jean Ratelle – 252
- Andy Bathgate – 207
- Chris Kreider – 197
- Vic Hadfield – 179
- Steve Vickers – 176
- Walt Tkaczuk – 175
- Adam Graves – 164
- Bryan Hextall Sr. – 160
- Artemi Panarin – 158

=== Most even strength points ===
- Rod Gilbert – 698
- Jean Ratelle – 592
- Walt Tkaczuk – 535
- Andy Bathgate – 499
- Brian Leetch – 446
- Steve Vickers – 416
- Mark Messier – 408
- Vic Hadfield – 407
- Artemi Panarin – 404
- Chris Kreider – 386

=== Most even strength assists ===
- Rod Gilbert – 400
- Walt Tkaczuk – 360
- Jean Ratelle – 340
- Brian Leetch – 320
- Andy Bathgate – 292
- Ron Greschner – 255
- Mark Messier – 253
- Artemi Panarin – 246
- Steve Vickers – 240
- **Mika Zibanejad – 239**

=== Most short-handed goals ===
- Mark Messier – 23
- Adam Graves – 16
- Don Maloney – 14
- **Mika Zibanejad – 13**
- Chris Kreider – 13
- Bill Fairbairn – 12
- Walt Tkaczuk – 11
- Mike Rogers – 10
- Cecil Dillon – 10
- Ron Duguay – 10

=== Most short-handed points ===
- Mark Messier – 51
- **Mika Zibanejad – 33**
- Walt Tkaczuk – 29
- Adam Graves – 27
- Don Maloney – 21
- Brian Leetch – 21
- Bill Fairbairn – 17
- Jan Erixon – 17
- Derek Stepan – 16
- Chris Kreider – 16

=== Most short-handed assists ===
- Mark Messier – 28
- **Mika Zibanejad – 20**
- Walt Tkaczuk −18
- Brian Leetch – 13
- Adam Graves – 11
- James Patrick – 10
- Dan Girardi – 10
- **Adam Fox – 9**
- Derek Stepan – 9
- Jan Erixon – 9
- Marc Staal – 9

=== Most game-winning goals ===
- Rod Gilbert – 52
- Chris Kreider – 50
- Jean Ratelle – 46
- Bill Cook – 42
- Mark Messier – 41
- Vic Hadfield – 40
- **Mika Zibanejad – 38**
- Brian Leetch – 37
- Adam Graves – 36
- Steve Vickers – 35

=== Most overtime goals ===
- **Mika Zibanejad – 8**
- **J.T. Miller – 7**
- Brian Leetch – 7
- Butch Keeling – 7
- Cecil Dillon – 7
- Marian Gaborik – 5
- Adam Graves – 5
- Theoren Fleury – 5
- Bill Cook – 5
- Frank Boucher – 5

=== Most overtime points ===
- **Mika Zibanejad – 19**
- Artemi Panarin – 18
- Mark Messier – 15
- Frank Boucher – 14
- Brian Leetch – 14
- Cecil Dillon – 13
- **J.T. Miller – 12**
- Ryan McDonagh – 10
- Theoren Fleury – 9
- Lynn Patrick – 9
- Bill Cook – 9
- **Adam Fox – 9**
- Derek Stepan – 9
- Chris Kreider – 9

=== Most overtime assists ===
- Artemi Panarin – 15
- Mark Messier – 12
- **Mika Zibanejad – 11**
- Frank Boucher – 9
- Ryan McDonagh – 8
- Michal Rozsival – 7
- Derek Stepan – 7
- Brian Leetch – 7
- Cecil Dillon – 6
- Lynn Patrick – 6
- **Adam Fox – 6**
- Phil Watson – 6
- Dan Girardi – 6
- Chris Kreider – 6

=== Most empty net goals ===
- Artemi Panarin – 19
- Michael Grabner – 11
- Mark Messier −11
- Ryan Strome – 10
- Rick Nash – 10
- **Mika Zibanejad – 10**
- Chris Kreider – 10
- Jimmy Vesey – 9
- Ryan Callahan – 9
- **J.T. Miller – 7**
- **Adam Fox – 7**

=== Most empty net points ===
- **Mika Zibanejad – 32**
- Artemi Panarin – 30
- **Adam Fox – 21**
- Chris Kreider – 18
- Mark Messier – 17
- Ryan Strome – 16
- Vincent Trocheck – 16
- Jimmy Vesey – 15
- Michael Grabner – 14
- Rick Nash – 14
- Jesper Fast – 14
- **J.T. Miller – 14**
- Ryan Callahan – 14
- Adam Graves – 14

=== Most empty net assists ===
- **Mika Zibanejad – 22**
- **Adam Fox – 14**
- Vincent Trocheck – 11
- Artemi Panarin – 11
- Jacob Trouba – 10
- Jesper Fast – 10
- Brian Leetch – 10
- K'Andre Miller – 9
- Mats Zuccarello – 9
- Ryan McDonagh – 9

=== Most shootout goals ===
- Mats Zuccarello – 25
- **Mika Zibanejad – 18**
- Artemi Panarin – 15
- Michael Nylander – 10
- Brendan Shanahan −8
- Erik Christensen – 7
- Derek Stepan – 7
- Kevin Shattenkirk – 6
- Vincent Trocheck – 6
- Nigel Dawes – 6
- Rick Nash – 6
- Ryan Callahan – 6

=== Most penalty minutes ===
- Ron Greschner – 1226
- Jeff Beukeboom – 1157
- Harry Howell – 1147
- Dave Maloney – 1113
- Vic Hadfield – 1041
- Nick Fotiu – 970
- Lou Fontinato – 940
- Ivan "Ching" Johnson – 826
- Adam Graves – 810
- Barry Beck – 775

=== Most penalties taken ===
- Harry Howell – 555
- Ron Greschner – 477
- Dave Maloney – 440
- Vic Hadfield – 400
- Ivan "Ching" Johnson – 398
- Jeff Beukeboom – 397
- Lou Fontinato – 364
- Jim Neilson – 338
- Adam Graves – 326
- Jack Evans – 311

=== Most games played ===
- Harry Howell – 1160
- Brian Leetch – 1129
- Rod Gilbert – 1065
- Ron Greschner – 981
- Walt Tkaczuk – 945
- Marc Staal – 892
- Henrik Lundqvist – 887
- Chris Kreider – 883
- Jean Ratelle – 861
- Vic Hadfield – 841

=== Most hat-tricks ===
- Bill Cook – 9
- **Mika Zibanejad — 9**
- Rod Gilbert – 7
- Artemi Panarin – 6
- Jean Ratelle – 6
- Frank Boucher – 6
- Camille Henry – 6
- Chris Kreider – 6
- Mark Messier – 6
- Steve Vickers – 6
- Petr Nedved – 6
- Phil Esposito – 6

=== Most wins by a goaltender ===
- Henrik Lundqvist – 459
- Mike Richter – 301
- Eddie Giacomin – 266
- Gump Worsley – 204
- John Vanbiesbrouck – 200
- **Igor Shesterkin – 187**
- Dave Kerr – 157
- Chuck Rayner – 123
- Gilles Villemure – 98
- John Davidson – 93

=== Most shutouts by a goaltender ===
- Henrik Lundqvist – 64
- Eddie Giacomin – 49
- Dave Kerr – 40
- John Ross Roach – 30
- Mike Richter – 24
- Gump Worsley – 24
- Chuck Rayner – 24
- **Igor Shesterkin – 22**
- Lorne Chabot – 21
- John Vanbiesbrouck – 16

=== Regular season Coaching ===
Coach	Games	W	L	T	OT	P%	W%
Emile Francis	654	342	209	103		.602	.523
Lester Patrick	604	281	216	107		.554	.465
Alain Vigneault	410	226	147		37	.596	.551
Frank Boucher	527	181	263	83		.422	.343
John Tortorella	319	171	118	1	29	.583	.536
Tom Renney	327	164	117	0	46	.572	.502
Roger Neilson	280	141	104	35		.566	.504
Herb Brooks	285	131	113	41		.532	.460
Phil Watson	295	119	124	52		.492	.403
Colin Campbell	269	118	108	43		.519	.439
Gerard Gallant	164	99	46		19	.662	.604
David Quinn	208	96	87		25	.522	.462
Peter Laviolette	164	94	59		11	.607	.573
Fred Shero	180	82	74	24		.522	.456
Michel Bergeron	158	73	67	18		.519	.462
John Muckler	185	70	88	24	3	.451	.378
Ron Low	164	69	81	9	5	.463	.421
Red Sullivan	196	58	103	35		.385	.296
Mike Keenan	84	52	24	8		.667	.619
Muzz Patrick	136	43	66	27		.415	.316
John Ferguson	121	43	59	19		.434	.355
Ted Sator	99	41	48	10		.465	.414
Lynn Patrick	107	40	51	16		.449	.374

Table is sorted by Wins, only includes regular season games, and only includes coaches with at least 40 Wins.

== All-time playoff leaders ==
=== Most goals ===
- Chris Kreider – 48
- Rod Gilbert – 34
- Mark Messier – 29
- Brian Leetch – 28
- Adam Graves – 28
- Ron Duguay – 28
- Steve Vickers – 24
- Don Maloney – 22
- Anders Hedberg – 22
- Vic Hadfield – 22

=== Most points ===
- Brian Leetch – 89
- Mark Messier – 80
- Chris Kreider – 76
- Rod Gilbert – 67
- Don Maloney – 57
- **Mika Zibanejad — 55**
- Walt Tkaczuk – 51
- Derek Stepan – 49
- Steve Vickers – 49
- Ron Greschner – 49

=== Most assists ===
- Brian Leetch – 61
- Mark Messier – 51
- **Mika Zibanejad — 38**
- Don Maloney – 35
- **Adam Fox – 34**
- Jean Ratelle – 33
- Rod Gilbert – 33
- Walt Tkaczuk – 32
- Brad Park – 32
- Ron Greschner – 32

=== Most power play goals ===
- Chris Kreider – 19
- Adam Graves – 13
- Brian Leetch – 12
- Rod Gilbert – 11
- Mike Gartner – 8
- **Mika Zibanejad – 8**
- Mark Messier – 8
- Ron Greschner – 7
- Derek Stepan – 6
- Brad Park – 6
- Pierre Larouche – 6

=== Most power play points ===
- Brian Leetch – 46
- Mark Messier – 30
- Chris Kreider – 26
- **Mika Zibanejad – 21**
- Brad Park – 21
- Ron Greschner – 21
- Adam Graves – 21
- James Patrick – 20
- **Adam Fox – 19**
- Rod Gilbert – 19

=== Most power play assists ===
- Brian Leetch – 34
- Mark Messier – 22
- **Adam Fox – 17**
- James Patrick – 17
- Brad Park – 15
- Ron Greschner – 14
- Sergei Zubov – 13
- **Mika Zibanejad – 13**
- Artemi Panarin – 12
- Don Maloney – 12

=== Most even strength goals ===
- Chris Kreider – 26
- Rod Gilbert – 23
- Ron Duguay – 21
- Steve Vickers – 20
- Mark Messier – 18
- Vic Hadfield – 18
- Don Maloney – 17
- Anders Hedberg – 17
- Walt Tkaczuk – 16
- Pete Stemkowski – 16

=== Most even strength points ===
- Rod Gilbert – 48
- Chris Kreider – 46
- Mark Messier – 45
- Brian Leetch – 41
- Steve Vickers – 40
- Walt Tkaczuk – 40
- Don Maloney – 39
- Ron Duguay – 36
- Derek Stepan – 32
- Vic Hadfield – 32

=== Most even strength assists ===
- Mark Messier – 27
- Brian Leetch – 26
- Rod Gilbert – 25
- Walt Tkaczuk – 24
- Jean Ratelle – 24
- Don Maloney – 22
- Dan Girardi – 22
- Ryan McDonagh – 21
- Steve Vickers – 20
- Derek Stepan – 20
- Rick Nash – 20
- Chris Kreider – 20

=== Most game-winning goals ===
- Chris Kreider – 12
- Mark Messier – 7
- Brian Leetch – 6
- Bill Cook – 6
- Frank Boucher – 6
- Artemi Panarin – 5
- Adam Graves – 5
- Rod Gilbert – 5
- Derick Brassard – 4
- Walt Tkaczuk – 4
- Esa Tikkanen – 4
- Pete Stemkowski – 4
- Alex Shibicky – 4
- Kris King – 4
- Dave Balon – 4

=== Most penalty minutes ===
- Ivan "Ching" Johnson – 150
- Jeff Beukeboom – 147
- Ed Hospodar – 135
- Brad Park – 129
- Walt Tkaczuk – 119
- Ron Greschner – 106
- Vic Hadfield – 106
- Ron Duguay – 103
- Ted Irvine – 102
- Troy Mallette – 99

=== Most penalties taken ===
- Ivan "Ching" Johnson – 75
- Jeff Beukeboom – 55
- Walt Tkaczuk – 48
- Ron Greschner – 46
- Brad Park – 42
- Dave Maloney – 41
- Mike Allison – 39
- Chris Kreider – 38
- Vic Hadfield – 36
- Don Maloney – 35
- Ted Irvine – 35

=== Most games played ===
- Henrik Lundqvist – 130
- Chris Kreider – 123
- Dan Girardi – 122
- Marc Staal – 107
- Derek Stepan – 97
- Ryan McDonagh – 96
- Walt Tkaczuk – 93
- Don Maloney – 85
- Ron Greschner – 84
- Brian Leetch – 82

=== Most wins by a goaltender ===
- Henrik Lundqvist – 61
- Mike Richter – 41
- Eddie Giacomin – 29
- **Igor Shesterkin – 23**
- Dave Kerr – 17
- John Davidson – 16
- John Vanbiesbrouck – 13
- John Ross Roach – 9
- Chuck Rayner – 9
- Eddie Mio – 9

=== Most shutouts by a goaltender ===
- Henrik Lundqvist – 10
- Mike Richter – 9
- Dave Kerr – 7
- John Ross Roach – 5
- Andy Aitkenhead – 3
- John Vanbiesbrouck – 2
- Lorne Chabot – 2
- Chuck Rayner – 1
- Joe Miller – 1
- Jim Henry – 1
- Eddie Giacomin – 1
- Glen Hanlon – 1
- John Davidson – 1

=== Playoff Coaching ===
Coach	Games	W	L	T
Emile Francis	75	34	41	0
Lester Patrick	65	33	26	7
Alain Vigneault	61	31	30	
John Tortorella	44	19	25	
Colin Campbell	36	18	18	0
Mike Keenan	23	16	7	0
Fred Shero	27	15	12	0
Frank Boucher	27	13	14	0
Roger Neilson	29	13	16	0
Gerard Gallant	27	13	14	
Herb Brooks	24	12	12	0
Tom Renney	24	11	13	0
Peter Laviolette	16	10	6	
Ted Sator	16	8	8	0
Lynn Patrick	12	7	5	0
Craig Patrick	17	7	10	0
Phil Watson	16	4	12	0
Doug Harvey	6	2	4	0
Phil Esposito	10	2	8	0
Jean-Guy Talbot	3	1	2	0
David Quinn	3	0	3	

Table is sorted by Wins and only includes playoff games.

== Single-season leaders ==
=== Most goals ===
Player	Season	GP	Goals
Jaromir Jagr	2005–06	82	54
Chris Kreider	2021–22	77	52
Adam Graves	1993–94	84	52
Vic Hadfield	1971–72	78	50
Mike Gartner	1990–91	79	49
Artemi Panarin	2023–24	82	49
Pierre Larouche	1983–84	77	48
Mark Messier	1995–96	74	47
Jean Ratelle	1971–72	63	46
Mike Gartner	1992–93	84	45

=== Most points ===
Player	Season	GP	Points
Jaromir Jagr	2005–06	82	123
Artemi Panarin	2023–24	82	120
Jean Ratelle	1971–72	63	109
Mark Messier	1991–92	79	107
Vic Hadfield	1971–72	78	106
Mike Rogers	1981–82	80	103
Brian Leetch	1991–92	80	102
Mark Messier	1995–96	74	99
Rod Gilbert	1971–72	73	97
Rod Gilbert	1974–75	76	97
Wayne Gretzky	1996–97	82	97

=== Most assists ===
Player	Season	GP	Assists
Brian Leetch	1991–92	80	80
Sergei Zubov	1993–94	78	77
Artemi Panarin	2021–22	78	74
Mark Messier	1991–92	79	72
Brian Leetch	1990–91	80	72
Wayne Gretzky	1996–97	82	72
Artemi Panarin	2023–24	82	71
Brian Leetch	1995–96	82	70
Jaromir Jagr	2005–06	82	69
Wayne Gretzky	1997–98	82	67

=== Most power play goals ===
Player	Season	GP	PPG
Chris Kreider	2021–22	80	26
Jaromir Jagr	2005–06	82	24
Vic Hadfield	1971–72	78	23
Marcel Dionne	1987–88	67	22
Mike Gartner	1990–91	79	22
Phil Esposito	1977–78	79	21
Camille Henry	1953–54	66	20
Mika Zibanejad	2022–23	82	20
Adam Graves	1993–94	84	20
Camille Henry	1957–58	70	19
Pierre Larouche	1983–84	77	19
John Ogrodnick	1989–90	80	19

=== Most power play points ===
Player	Season	GP	PPP
Brian Leetch	1993–94	84	53
Jaromir Jagr	2005–06	82	52
Brian Leetch	1990–91	80	51
Sergei Zubov	1993–94	78	49
Brian Leetch	1991–92	80	46
Marcel Dionne	1987–88	67	44
Artemi Panarin	2023–24	82	44
Brian Leetch	1995–96	82	44
Rod Gilbert	1974–75	76	43
Jaromir Jagr	2006–07	82	41

=== Most power play assists ===
Player	Season	GP	PPA
Brian Leetch	1990–91	80	45
Sergei Zubov	1993–94	78	40
Brian Leetch	1995–96	82	37
Brian Leetch	1991–92	80	36
Brian Leetch	1993–94	84	36
Jaromir Jagr	2006–07	82	34
Adam Fox	2021–22	78	33
Artemi Panarin	2023–24	82	33
Artemi Panarin	2021–22	75	32
Rod Gilbert	1974–75	76	32

=== Most even strength goals ===
Player	Season	GP	EVG
Jean Ratelle	1971–72	63	40
Artemi Panarin	2023–24	82	38
Rod Gilbert	1971–72	73	37
Mark Messier	1995–96	74	32
Rick Nash	2014–15	79	32
Mike Gartner	1992–93	84	32
Mike Rogers	1981–82	80	31
Marian Gaborik	2011–12	82	31
Andy Bathgate	1962–63	70	30
Andy Bathgate	1958–59	70	30
Jean Ratelle	1972–73	78	30
Jaromir Jagr	2005–06	82	30

=== Most even strength points ===
Player	Season	GP	EVP
Jean Ratelle	1971–72	63	82
Artemi Panarin	2023–24	82	75
Rod Gilbert	1971–72	73	74
Vic Hadfield	1971–72	78	72
Artemi Panarin	2019–20	69	71
Jaromir Jagr	2005–06	82	71
Jean Ratelle	1972–73	78	69
Pete Stemkowski	1973–74	78	66
Mark Messier	1991–92	79	65
Mike Rogers	1981–82	80	65
Wayne Gretzky	1996–97	82	65

=== Most even strength assists ===
Player	Season	GP	EVA
Artemi Panarin	2019–20	69	46
Mark Messier	1991–92	79	46
Wayne Gretzky	1996–97	82	46
Vic Hadfield	1971–72	78	45
Michael Nylander	2005–06	81	45
Brian Leetch	1991–92	80	44
Pete Stemkowski	1973–74	78	43
Wayne Gretzky	1997–98	82	43
Jean Ratelle	1971–72	63	42
Artemi Panarin	2021–22	75	42
Rod Gilbert	1972–73	76	42
Walt Tkaczuk	1969–70	76	42

=== Most shots on goal ===
Player	Season	GP	SOG
Jaromir Jagr	2005–06	82	368
Phil Esposito	1976–77	80	344
Brian Leetch	1993–94	84	328
Jaromir Jagr	2006–07	82	324
Mike Gartner	1992–93	84	323
Vic Hadfield	1968–69	73	321
Andy Bathgate	1961–62	70	305
Andy Bathgate	1960–61	70	304
Rick Nash	2014–15	79	304
Artemi Panarin	2023–24	82	303
Rod Gilbert	1968–69	66	301

=== Most penalty minutes ===
Player	Season	GP	PIM
Troy Mallette	1989–90	79	305
Kris King	1989–90	68	286
Troy Mallette	1990–91	71	252
Tie Domi	1991–92	42	246
Barry Beck	1980–81	75	231
Michel Petit	1987–88	64	227
Chris Simon	2003–04	65	225
Kris King	1991–92	79	224
Jeff Beukeboom	1995–96	82	220
Theoren Fleury	2001–02	82	216

=== Most penalties taken ===
Player	Season	GP	Pen Taken
Michel Petit	1987–88	64	88
Lou Fontinato	1955–56	70	86
Troy Mallette	1989–90	79	85
Kris King	1989–90	68	84
Kris King	1991–92	79	77
Jeff Beukeboom	1995–96	82	73
Gus Kyle	1949–50	70	70
Troy Mallette	1990–91	71	70
Theoren Fleury	2001–02	82	69
Ivan "Ching" Johnson	1927–28	42	67
Michel Petit	1988–89	69	67

== Single-season leaders – rookies ==
=== Most rookie goals ===
Player	Season	GP	Goals
Tony Granato	1988–89	78	36
Tony Amonte	1991–92	79	35
Bill Cook	1926–27	44	33
Mark Pavelich	1981–82	79	33
Don Murdoch	1976–77	59	32
Darren Turcotte	1989–90	76	32
Steve Vickers	1972–73	61	30
Petr Prucha	2005–06	68	30
Ulf Dahlen	1987–88	70	29
Tomas Sandstrom	1984–85	74	29

=== Most rookie points ===
Player	Season	GP	Points
Mark Pavelich	1981–82	79	76
Brian Leetch	1988–89	68	71
Tony Amonte	1991–92	79	69
Darren Turcotte	1989–90	76	66
Mike Ridley	1985–86	80	65
Mike Allison	1980–81	75	64
Tony Granato	1988–89	78	63
Tomas Sandstrom	1984–85	74	58
Don Murdoch	1976–77	59	56
Bill Fairbairn	1969–70	76	56
Reijo Ruotsalainen	1981–82	78	56

=== Most rookie assists ===
Player	Season	GP	Assists
Brian Leetch	1988–89	68	48
Mark Pavelich	1981–82	79	43
Mike Ridley	1985–86	80	43
Mike Allison	1980–81	75	38
Reijo Ruotsalainen	1981–82	78	38
Ron Greschner	1974–75	70	37
Adam Fox	2019–20	70	34
Darren Turcotte	1989–90	76	34
Tony Amonte	1991–92	79	34
Brady Skjei	2016–17	80	34

=== Most rookie power play goals ===
Player	Season	GP	PPG
Camille Henry	1953–54	66	20
Petr Prucha	2005–06	68	16
Mark Pavelich	1981–82	79	12
Don Murdoch	1976–77	59	11
Ulf Dahlen	1987–88	70	11
Darren Turcotte	1989–90	76	10
Andy Hebenton	1955–56	70	9
Tony Amonte	1992–91	79	9
Brian Leetch	1988–89	68	8
Mike York	1999–00	82	8

=== Most rookie power play points ===
Player	Season	GP	PPP
Camille Henry	1953–54	66	32
Brian Leetch	1988–89	68	31
Darren Turcotte	1989–90	76	28
Petr Prucha	2005–06	68	22
Michael Del Zotto	2009–10	80	22
Reijo Ruotsalainen	1981–82	78	21
Mike Ridley	1985–86	80	21
Mark Pavelich	1981–82	79	20
Mike McEwen	1976–77	80	20
Ulf Dahlen	1987–88	70	19

=== Most rookie power play assists ===
Player	Season	GP	PPA
Brian Leetch	1988–89	68	23
Darren Turcotte	1989–90	76	18
Michael Del Zotto	2009–10	80	18
Mike McEwen	1976–77	80	15
Raimo Helminen	1985–86	66	14
Reijo Ruotsalainen	1981–82	78	14
Mike Ridley	1985–86	80	14
Camille Henry	1953–54	66	12
Rod Seiling	1964–65	68	12
Adam Fox	2019–20	70	12
Mike Allison	1980–81	75	12

=== Most rookie even strength goals ===
Player	Season	GP	EVG
Steve Vickers	1972–73	61	28
Tony Granato	1988–89	78	28
Tony Amonte	1992–91	79	26
Wally Hergesheimer	1951–52	68	25
Tomas Sandstrom	1984–85	74	24
Mike Allison	1980–81	75	22
Don Murdoch	1976–77	59	21
Lucien DeBlois	1977–78	71	21
Darren Turcotte	1989–90	76	21
Bill Fairbairn	1969–70	76	20
Peter Sundstrom	1983–84	77	20

=== Most rookie even strength points ===
Player	Season	GP	EVP
Tony Amonte	1992–91	79	52
Mark Pavelich	1981–82	79	52
Tony Granato	1988–89	78	51
Steve Vickers	1972–73	61	49
Bill Fairbairn	1969–70	76	49
Mike Allison	1980–81	75	48
Tomas Sandstrom	1984–85	74	44
Mike Ridley	1985–86	80	44
Peter Sundstrom	1983–84	77	40
Kevin Hayes	2014–15	79	39

=== Most rookie even strength assists ===
Player	Season	GP	EVA
Mark Pavelich	1981–82	79	34
Bill Fairbairn	1969–70	76	29
Mike Ridley	1985–86	80	29
Brady Skjei	2016–17	80	27
Ron Greschner	1974–75	70	26
Mike Allison	1980–81	75	26
Tony Amonte	1991–92	79	26
Carl Hagelin	2011–12	64	24
Brian Leetch	1988–89	68	24
Reijo Ruotsalainen	1981–82	78	24
Kevin Hayes	2014–15	79	24

=== Most rookie shots on goal ===
Player	Season	GP	SOG
Brian Leetch	1988–89	68	268
Reijo Ruotsalainen	1981–82	78	247
Tony Granato	1988–89	78	234
Tony Amonte	1992–91	79	234
Don Murdoch	1976–77	59	223
Darren Turcotte	1989–90	76	205
Mike McEwen	1976–77	80	203
Tomas Sandstrom	1984–85	74	188
Mark Pavelich	1981–82	79	181
Mike York	1999–00	82	177

=== Most rookie penalty minutes ===
Player	Season	GP	PIM
Troy Mallette	1989–90	79	305
Ed Hospodar	1980–81	61	214
Rudy Poeschek	1988–89	52	199
Tie Domi	1990–91	28	185
Dale Purinton	2000–01	42	180
Darren Langdon	1995–96	64	175
Mark Janssens	1989–90	80	161
Chris Kotsopoulos	1980–81	54	153
Mario Marois	1978–79	71	153
Eric Cairns	1996–97	40	147

=== Most rookie penalties taken ===
Player	Season	GP	Pen Taken
Troy Mallette	1989–90	79	85
Gus Kyle	1949–50	70	70
Tony Granato	1988–89	78	63
Arnie Brown	1964–65	58	60
Ed Hospodar	1980–81	61	59
Mark Janssens	1989–90	80	56
Dave Farrish	1976–77	80	51
Rudy Poeschek	1988–89	52	50
Ivan Irwin	1953–54	56	50
Darren Langdon	1995–96	64	48

== Single-season records by position ==
=== Defensemen ===
Stat	Player	Season	Total
Goals	Reijo Ruotsalainen	1984–85	28
Points	Brian Leetch	1991–92	102
Assists	Brian Leetch	1991–92	80
PPG	Brian Leetch	1993–94	17
PPP	Brian Leetch	1993–94	53
PPA	Brian Leetch	1990–91	45
EVG	Brad Park; Ron Greschner	1973–74; 1980–81	21
EVP	Brian Leetch	1991–92	55
EVA	Brian Leetch	1991–92	44
SHG	Brian Leetch; Ryan McDonagh	1988–89; 2013–14	3
SHP	Brian Leetch	2000–01	5
SHA	James Patrick; Brian Leetch	1984–85; 2000–01	4
GWG	Ron Greschner; Tom Poti; Adam Fox	1977–78; 2003–04; 2022–23, 2023–24	5
OTG	Brian Leetch; Tom Poti; Kevin Klein; Tony DeAngelo	2001–02; 2003–04; 2014–15; 2019–20	2
ENG	Ron Greschner; James Patrick; Ryan McDonagh; Adam Fox	1985–86; 1991–92; 2013–14; 2024–25, 2025–26	2
Shots	Brian Leetch	1993–94	328
PIM	Barry Beck	1980–81	231
Pen Taken	Michel Petit	1987–88	88

=== Forwards ===
Stat	Player	Season	Total
Goals	Jaromir Jagr	2005–06	54
Points	Jaromir Jagr	2005–06	123
Assists	Artemi Panarin	2021–22	74
PPG	Chris Kreider	2021–22	26
PPP	Jaromir Jagr	2005–06	52
PPA	Jaromir Jagr	2006–07	34
EVG	Jean Ratelle	1971–72	40
EVP	Jean Ratelle	1971–72	82
EVA	Mark Messier; Wayne Gretzky; Artemi Panarin	1991–92; 1996–97; 2019–20	46
SHG	Theo Fleury	2000–01	7
SHP	Marc Messier	1996–97	11
SHA	Marc Messier	1993–94	7
GWG	Chris Kreider	2021–22	11
OTG	Tomas Sandstrom; Adam Graves; Marian Gaborik; J.T. Miller	1986–87; 1998–99; 2011–12; 2025–26	3
ENG	Michael Grabner	2017–18	7
Shots	Jaromir Jagr	2005–06	368
PIM	Troy Mallette	1989–90	305
Pen Taken	Troy Mallette	1989–90	85

=== Goaltenders ===
Stat	Player	Season	Total
Games played	Henrik Lundqvist	2009–10	73
Games started	Henrik Lundqvist	2009–10	72
Wins	Mike Richter	1993–94	42
Shots against	Gump Worsley	1955–56	2574
Saves	Gump Worsley	1955–56	2376
Sv%	Igor Shesterkin	2021–22	.935
GAA	John Ross Roach	1928–29	1.41
SO	John Ross Roach	1928–29	13
Points	John Vanbiesbrouck; Mike Richter	1984–85, 1987–88; 1992–93	5
Assists	John Vanbiesbrouck; Mike Richter	1984–85, 1987–88; 1992–93	5
PIM	Bob Froese	1986–87	56
Shootouts	Henrik Lundqvist	2007–08, 2008–09	13
S/O Wins	Henrik Lundqvist	2008–09	9
S/O Shots against	Henrik Lundqvist	2006–07	50
S/O Saves	Henrik Lundqvist	2006–07	41
S/O Sv%	Alexander Georgiev; Igor Shesterkin	2019–20; 2024–25	1.000

== Single-season records by nationality ==
=== Canadian ===
- Points by a Canadian: Jean Ratelle (1971–72) – 109
- Goals by a Canadian: Adam Graves (1993–94) – 52
- Assists by a Canadian: Mark Messier (1991–92), Wayne Gretzky (1996–97) – 72
- Power play points by a Canadian: Marcel Dionne (1987–88) – 44
- Power play goals by a Canadian: Vic Hadfield (1971–72) – 23
- Power play assists by a Canadian: Rod Gilbert (1974–75) – 32
- Empty net goals by a Canadian: Mark Messier (1995–96), Ryan Strome (2019–20) – 4
- Shots on goal by a Canadian: Phil Esposito (1976–77) – 344
- Goaltending wins by a Canadian: Eddie Giacomin (1968–69) – 38

=== American ===
- Points by an American: Brian Leetch (1991–92) – 102
- Goals by an American: Chris Kreider (2021–2022) – 52
- Power play goals by an American: Chris Kreider (2021–22) – 26
- Even strength points by an American: Mark Pavelich (1983–84), Brian Leetch (1991–92) – 55
- Even strength goals by an American: Tony Granato (1988–89) – 28
- Even strength assists by an American: Brian Leetch (1991–92) – 44
- Short-handed points by an American: Kevin Hayes (2016–17), Vincent Trocheck (2024–25) – 7
- Short-handed goals by an American: Cecil Dillon (1934–35), Vincent Trocheck (2024–25) – 6
- Short-handed assists by an American: Kevin Hayes (2016–17) – 6
- Overtime goals by an American: J.T. Miller (2025–26) – 3
- Empty net goals by an American: Brandon Dubinsky (2010–11) – 5
- Plus/minus by an American: Brian Leetch (1996–97) – +31
- Shots on goal by an American: Brian Leetch (1993–94) – 328
- Penalty minutes by an American: Ed Hospodar (1980–81) – 214
- Penalties taken by an American: Tony Granato (1988–89) – 63
- Goaltending shutouts by an American: Mike Richter (1993–94), Mike Dunham (2002–03) – 5
- Goaltending saves by an American: Mike Richter (1996–97) – 1784

=== European ===
- Assists by a European: Sergei Zubov (1993–94) – 77
- Power play points by a European: Jaromir Jagr (2005–06) – 52
- Power play assists by a European: Sergei Zubov (1993–94) – 40
- Even strength points by a European: Artemi Panarin (2023–24) – 75
- Even strength goals by a European: Artemi Panarin (2023–24) – 38
- Short-handed points by a European: Mika Zibanejad (2023–24 ,2024–25) – 6
- Short-handed goals by a European: Jan Erixon (1990–91), Esa Tikkanen (1993–94), Radek Dvorak (2001–02), Petr Nedved (2002–03), Mika Zibanejad (2019–20) – 3
- Short-handed assists by a European: Mika Zibanejad (2024–25) – 6
- Plus/minus by a European: Artemi Panarin (2019–20) – +36
- Penalty minutes by a European: Alexei Kovalev (1993–94) – 154
- Penalties taken by a European: Ulf Samuelsson (1996–97) – 57
- Goaltending wins by a European: Henrik Lundqvist (2011–12) – 39
- Goaltending shutouts by a European: Henrik Lundqvist (2010–11) – 11
- Goaltending saves by a European: Henrik Lundqvist (2009–10) – 1942

=== Czech ===
- Assists by a Czech: Jaromir Jagr (2005–06) – 69
- Power play assists by a Czech: Jaromir Jagr (2006–07) – 34
- Even strength goals by a Czech: Jaromir Jagr (2005–06) – 30
- Even strength assists by a Czech: Jaromir Jagr (2005–06) – 41
- Short-handed points by a Czech: Petr Nedved (2002–03) – 5
- Short-handed assists by a Czech: Radek Dvorak (1999–00, 2000–01, 2002–03), Petr Nedved (2002–03), Marek Malik (2006–07), Michal Rozsival (2006–07, 2008–09) – 2
- Overtime goals by a Czech: Petr Nedved (2002–03), Jaromir Jagr (2005–06) – 2
- Empty net goals by a Czech: Bobby Holik (2003–04), Filip Chytil (2022–23) – 3
- Plus/minus by a Czech: Michal Rozsival (2005–06) – +35
- Penalty minutes by a Czech: Tomas Kloucek (2001–02) – 137
- Penalties taken by a Czech: Michal Rozsival (2006–07) – 45
- Goaltending wins by a Czech: Ondrej Pavelec (2017–18) – 4
- Goaltending shutouts by a Czech: Ondrej Pavelec (2017–18) – 1
- Goaltending saves by a Czech: Ondrej Pavelec (2017–18) – 464

=== Finnish ===
- Points by a Finnish: Reijo Ruotsalainen (1984–85) – 73
- Goals by a Finnish: Reijo Ruotsalainen (1984–85) – 28
- Assists by a Finnish: Reijo Ruotsalainen (1982–83) – 53
- Power play points by a Finnish: Reijo Ruotsalainen (1984–85) – 30
- Power play goals by a Finnish: Reijo Ruotsalainen (1984–85) – 10
- Power play assists by a Finnish: Reijo Ruotsalainen (1984–85) – 20
- Even strength points by a Finnish: Reijo Ruotsalainen (1982–83) – 45
- Even strength goals by a Finnish: Reijo Ruotsalainen (1984–85), Kaapo Kakko (2022–23) – 18
- Even strength assists by a Finnish: Reijo Ruotsalainen (1982–83) – 34
- Short-handed points by a Finnish: Esa Tikkanen (1993–94) – 4
- Short-handed assists by a Finnish: Mikko Leinonen (1982–83, 1983–84), Reijo Ruotsalainen (1984–85), Esa Tikkanen (1993–94), Ville Nieminen (2005–06) – 1
- Game-winning goals by a Finnish: Reijo Ruotsalainen (1982–83, 1983–84), Esa Tikkanen (1993–94) – 4
- Overtime goals by a Finnish: Reijo Ruotsalainen (1983–84, 1984–85), Olli Jokinen (2009–10), Kaapo Kakko (2019–20) – 1
- Empty net goals by a Finnish: Kaapo Kakko (2022–23) – 2
- Plus/minus by a Finnish: Reijo Ruotsalainen (1982–83) – +27
- Shots on goal by a Finnish: Reijo Ruotsalainen (1983–84) – 288
- Penalty minutes by a Finnish: Esa Tikkanen (1993–94) – 114
- Penalties taken by a Finnish: Esa Tikkanen (1993–94) – 49
- Goaltending wins by a Finnish: Antti Raanta (2016–17) – 16
- Goaltending shutouts by a Finnish: Antti Raanta (2016–17) – 4
- Goaltending saves by a Finnish: Antti Raanta (2016–17) – 721

=== Russian ===
- Points by a Russian: Artemi Panarin (2023–24) – 120
- Goals by a Russian: Artemi Panarin (2023–24) – 49
- Power play points by a Russian: Sergei Zubov (1993–94) – 49
- Power play goals by a Russian: Artemi Panarin (2023–24) – 11
- Even strength goals by a Russian: Artemi Panarin (2023–24) – 38
- Short-handed points by a Russian: Vladislav Namestnikov (2018–19) – 5
- Short-handed goals by a Russian: Pavel Buchnevich (2020–21) – 3
- Short-handed assists by a Russian: Sergei Nemchinov (1993–94), Vladislav Namestnikov (2018–19) – 3
- Game-winning goals by a Russian: Alexei Kovalev (1995–96) – 7
- Overtime goals by a Russian: 8 players (Note: Sergei Nemchinov (1991–92), Valeri Kamensky (2000–01), Pavel Bure (2002–03), Darius Kasparaitis (2002–03), Artem Anisimov (2010–11), Vladimir Tarasenko (2022–23), Artemi Panarin (2021–22, 2022–23, 2023–24), Vladislav Gavrikov (2025–26)) – 1
- Empty net goals by a Russian: Artemi Panarin (2023–24) – 5
- Plus/minus by a Russian: Artemi Panarin (2019–20) – +36
- Shots on goal by a Russian: Artemi Panarin (2023–24) – 303
- Penalties taken by a Russian: Alexei Kovalev (1993–94) – 51
- Goaltending wins by a Russian: Igor Shesterkin (2022–23) – 37
- Goaltending shutouts by a Russian: Igor Shesterkin (2021–22) – 6
- Goaltending saves by a Russian: Igor Shesterkin (2024–25) – 1584

=== Swede ===
- Points by a Swede: Mika Zibanejad (2022–23)– 91
- Goals by a Swede: Mika Zibanejad (2019–20) – 41
- Assists by a Swede: Michael Nylander (2006–07) – 57
- Power play points by a Swede: Mika Zibanejad (2022–23) – 39
- Power play goals by a Swede: Mika Zibanejad (2022–23) – 20
- Power play assists by a Swede: Michael Nylander (2006–07) –23
- Even strength points by a Swede: Michael Nylander (2005–06) – 62
- Even strength goals by a Swede: Anders Hedberg (1978–79), Tomas Sandstrom (1986–87) – 27
- Game-winning goals by a Swede: Mika Zibanejad (2020–21) – 7
- Empty net goals by a Swede: Carl Hagelin (2013–14, 2014–15), Jesper Fast (2015–16) – 3
- Plus/minus by a Swede: Michael Nylander (2005–06) – +31
- Shots on goal by a Swede: Mika Zibanejad (2022–23) – 251
- Penalty minutes by a Swede: Tomas Sandstrom (1988–89) – 148

== See also ==
- List of New York Rangers players
- List of New York Rangers seasons
- List of NHL statistical leaders
- List of NHL players
