= Chris Kreider =

American ice hockey player

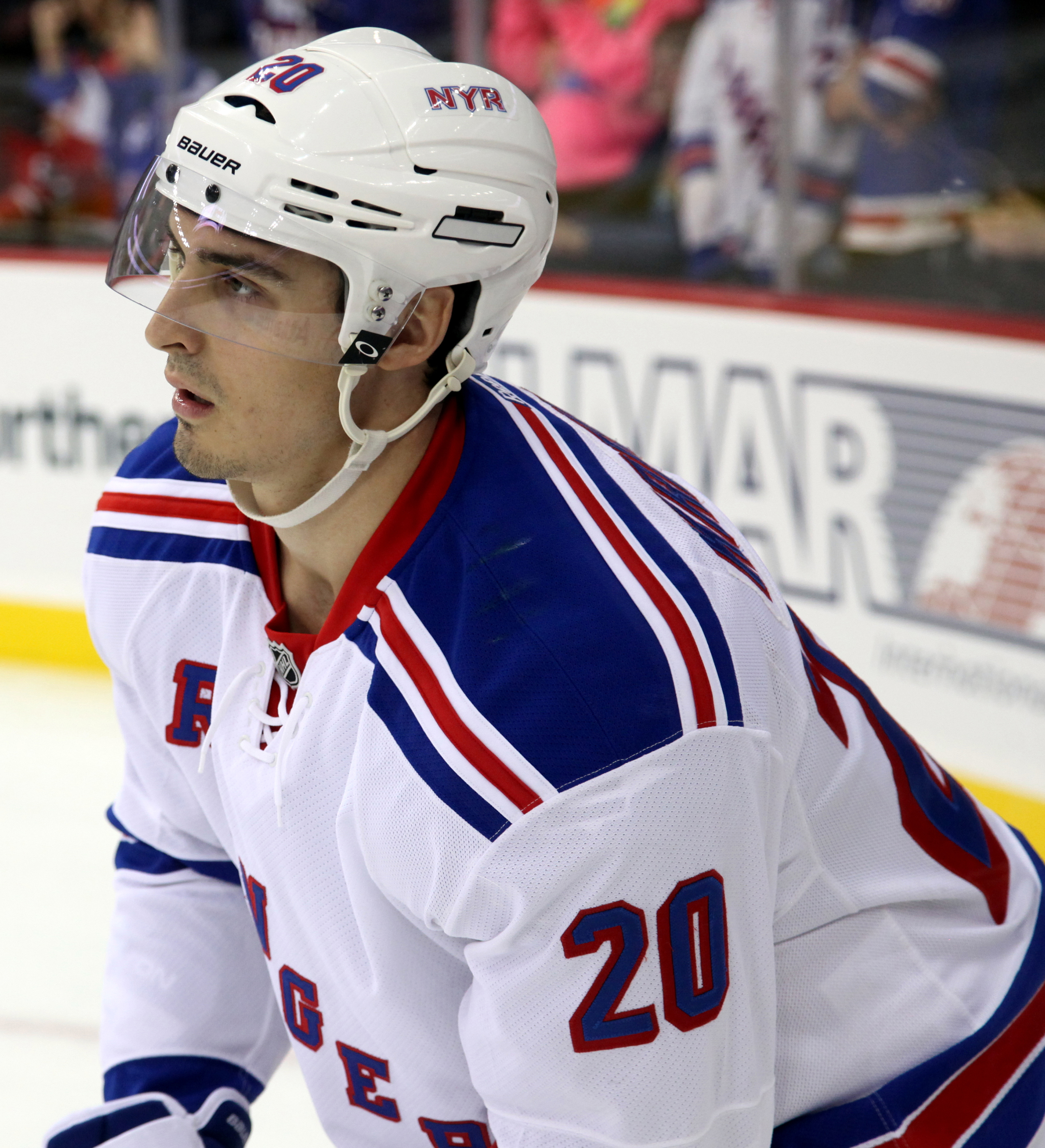
- Kreider with the New York Rangers in 2014
- Born: April 30, 1991 (age 35) Boxford, Massachusetts, U.S.
- Height: 6 ft 3 in (191 cm)
- Weight: 232 lb (105 kg; 16 st 8 lb)
- Position: Winger
- Shoots: Left
- NHL team Former teams: Montreal Canadiens; New York Rangers; Anaheim Ducks
- National team: United States
- NHL draft: 19th overall, 2009; New York Rangers
- Playing career: 2012–present

Christopher James Kreider (born April 30, 1991) is an American professional ice hockey player who is a winger for the Montreal Canadiens of the National Hockey League (NHL).

Growing up in Boxford, Massachusetts, Kreider played high school hockey for Masconomet Regional High School and Phillips Andover. As a junior at Phillips Andover, Kreider led the team to the New England Prep semifinals and was named New England Prep Player of the Year. Following high school, Kreider played college ice hockey for the Boston College Eagles from 2009 to 2012. Before the start of his freshman season, Kreider was drafted in the first round, 19th overall, by the New York Rangers in the 2009 NHL entry draft. At Boston College, Kreider was named to the All-Hockey East Rookie and All-Hockey East Second Team before turning professional in April 2012 after winning his second NCAA championship.

Kreider made his NHL debut during the 2012 Stanley Cup playoffs, where he set a new NHL record for most playoff goals before playing in a regular season game. Kreider split the next two seasons between the NHL and the Rangers American Hockey League affiliate before becoming a mainstay on the NHL roster in the 2014–15 season. Although his next few seasons were marred with injuries, Kreider continued to set personal and franchise records in both the regular and postseasons. His efforts were recognized by the league with two selections for the NHL All-Star Game and by the fans with the Rangers' Steven McDonald Extra Effort Award. During the 2024 Stanley Cup playoffs, Kreider became the Rangers' all-time leader in playoff goals, playoff power play goals, and playoff game-winning goals. In the 2025 off-season, Kreider was traded to the Anaheim Ducks, with whom he spent one season before mutually parting ways with the team.

Kreider has represented the United States internationally at both a junior and senior level. He first represented his home country during the 2010 World Junior Championships, where he won a gold medal. Since 2010, he has represented senior team at four international tournaments and won two bronze medals.

== Early life ==
Kreider was born on April 30, 1991, in Boxford, Massachusetts, to parents Kathy and David Kreider. He grew up alongside his younger sister Katie.

== Playing career ==
=== Amateur ===
Growing up in Boxford, Kreider played with the Valley Jr. Warriors for four years from 2004 to 2008 before enrolling at Masconomet Regional High School. Although he was accepted into Pingree and St. John's Prep coming out of middle school, Kreider and his family chose to enroll him in public school. As a sophomore at Masconomet, he became an All-League player and helped the Chieftains win the Cape Ann League championship. Although he transferred to Phillips Andover for his junior year, Kreider repeated his sophomore year at the private school. Kreider was still able to graduate high school within four years by taking an accelerated summer program. Prior to leaving for Phillips Andover, Kreider experienced a breakout season with 28 goals and 13 assists through 23 games and was named Salem News Player of the Year. In his first year at Phillips Andover, Kreider quickly led the team in goals and accumulated 28 points through 21 games. He improved the following year as he finished with 56 points through 26 games to lead Phillips Andover to the New England Prep semifinals. Although they fell short of the championship, Kreider was named New England Prep Player of the Year.

=== Collegiate ===
Following high school, Kreider enrolled at Boston College for three years where he majored in communications. Prior to the start of his freshman year, Kreider was drafted in the first round, 19th overall, by the New York Rangers, in the 2009 NHL entry draft. He had entered the draft rated 14th among all North American skaters, and first among high school players, by the NHL Central Scouting Bureau. Kreider recorded four shots on net in his National Collegiate Athletic Association (NCAA) debut on October 18 against the Vermont Catamounts. He recorded his first NCAA point, an assist on Ben Smith's second-period goal, the following game to lift Boston College over Notre Dame. Prior to joining the United States junior team at the 2010 World Junior Championships, Kreider led all rookies on the team with four goals and four assists for eight points through 12 games. After returning from the tournament, Kreider quickly tallied 12 goals and four assists through 12 games and maintained a six-game point streak from February 14 to March 5. He finished his rookie season second in the conference among freshmen with 14 goals and tied for ninth in points with 21. As a result, he was named to the 2009-10 Hockey East All-Rookie Team. As the Boston College Eagles qualified for the 2010 Hockey East semifinals, Kreider tallied a goal and an assist in a 3–0 win over Vermont. In their championship game against the Maine Black Bears, he recorded two assists in their 7–6 overtime win. Kreider scored a goal in the 2010 NCAA Division I men's ice hockey tournament title game to help the Eagles defeat the University of Wisconsin to win the national title. He subsequently became the second American to capture a World Junior Championship gold medal and NCAA title in the same year.

Following the NCAA title, Kreider was also selected to take part in the 2010 U.S. National Junior Evaluation Camp in August 2010 before returning to Boston College for his sophomore season. While leading the Eagles through the 2011 Beanpot Tournament, Kreider tallied two goals and an assist on the overtime game-winner to help the team clinch their second-straight title. He was subsequently named the Most Valuable Player of the tournament for his efforts. His momentum was cut short in March after he suffered a broken jaw when teammate Brian Gibbons accidentally struck him during a game. While he was recovering, the Eagles improved their record to 30–7–1 to clinch the Hockey East title and qualify for the 2011 NCAA Division I men's ice hockey tournament. Despite undergoing surgery, Kreider returned to the lineup on March 25 and tallied an assist in their 8–4 loss. He finished the regular season with 11 goals and 13 assists through 32 games although the Eagles were eliminated from the NCAA tournament in the semifinal of the Western Regional by Colorado College. Following their elimination, Kreider announced his intention to return to Boston College for the 2011–12 season. When speaking on his decision to return to Boston College, Kreider said: "Education is very important to me ... and regardless of how long it takes, I will finish my BC degree. There is life after hockey, and whether it is after next year or regardless, it's just one step closer to getting my degree, which is very important for myself and for my family."

Kreider returned to Boston College for his junior year, as promised, where he led the team to a second NCAA title with 23 goals and 45 points in 44 games. Kreider scored his first collegiate short-handed goal on December 4, 2011, against Boston University. While leading the Eagles through the 2012 Beanpot Tournament, Kreider tallied a goal and an assist to help the team clinch their third-straight title and establish new career-highs. Kreider finished the regular season with a team-leading 23 goals and 22 assists for 45 points over 44 games. His 45 points were fifth amongst Hockey East players and tied for 19th in the NCAA. As a result of their on-ice success, Kreider and the Eagles qualified for the 2012 NCAA Division I men's ice hockey tournament. In their first round matchup against the Air Force Falcons, Kreider scored the Eagles' only goals in the 2–0 win. In the next round, he tallied a goal and an assist in the Eagles' 6–1 win over the Minnesota Golden Gophers in the semifinals. During the National Championship game against the Ferris State Bulldogs, Kreider led all skaters with six shots on net in their 4–1 win to lead the Eagles to another Hockey East Tournament title. At the end of the season, Kreider was selected for the All-Hockey East Second Team.

=== Professional ===
==== New York Rangers ====
===== 2011–2012 =====
Kreider officially concluded his collegiate career on April 10, 2012, by signing a three-year, entry-level contract with the Rangers. He immediately participated in the Rangers practice, which per league rules reduced the length of his contract by a year, but was not guaranteed a spot in the lineup. When the Rangers began their 2012 Stanley Cup playoffs series against the Ottawa Senators, Kreider served as a healthy scratch for their first two games. However, after teammate Carl Hagelin was suspended for three games, Kreider made his NHL debut in game three of the Eastern Conference quarterfinals on April 16, 2012. He played just over 11 minutes of ice time and recorded one shot on net and one hit. After playing over 11 minutes in his debut, he played just 3:29 in his following game and 7:34 in game five. Despite his decreased ice time, Kreider remained in the lineup for game five where he played on the second line as a replacement for Brian Boyle. In his fourth career playoff game, Kreider scored his first career NHL goal, the game-winning goal, to help the Rangers stave off elimination. In game seven of the quarterfinals, Kreider forced a turnover which allowed for Marc Staal to score and help the Rangers clinch the series with a 2–1 win.

Kreider's momentum continued into their Eastern Conference semifinals series against the Washington Capitals. In Game one of the series, Kreider tallied his second NHL goal to give the Rangers a 2–1 lead seven minutes into the third period. He finished the game playing 15:35 of ice time and adding an assist as the Rangers won 3–1. Kreider subsequently set numerous franchise records with his third-period goal as he became the youngest Rangers player to record two points in a playoff game since 1996 and the first rookie to register a multi-point game in the postseason since 2008. He also became the first Rangers rookie to register two game-winning goals in the postseason since Mike Allison in 1981. Despite his game-winning goals, Kreider still experienced slow starts as he became acclimated to the NHL. In game four of the Eastern Conference semifinals, Kreider's turnover led directly to an Alexander Ovechkin goal and eventually a Rangers' loss. The Rangers eventually eliminated the Capitals and faced off against the New Jersey Devils in the Eastern Conference final. Kreider scored his third postseason goal in game one to help the Rangers shutout the Devils 3–0. He subsequently tied a league record for most playoff goals scored in a single postseason by a player who has not yet skated in a regular season game. He scored again in games two and three to set a new NHL record for most playoff goals before playing his first regular season game. The Rangers were eventually eliminated from the playoffs after losing in overtime of game six.

===== 2012–2013 =====
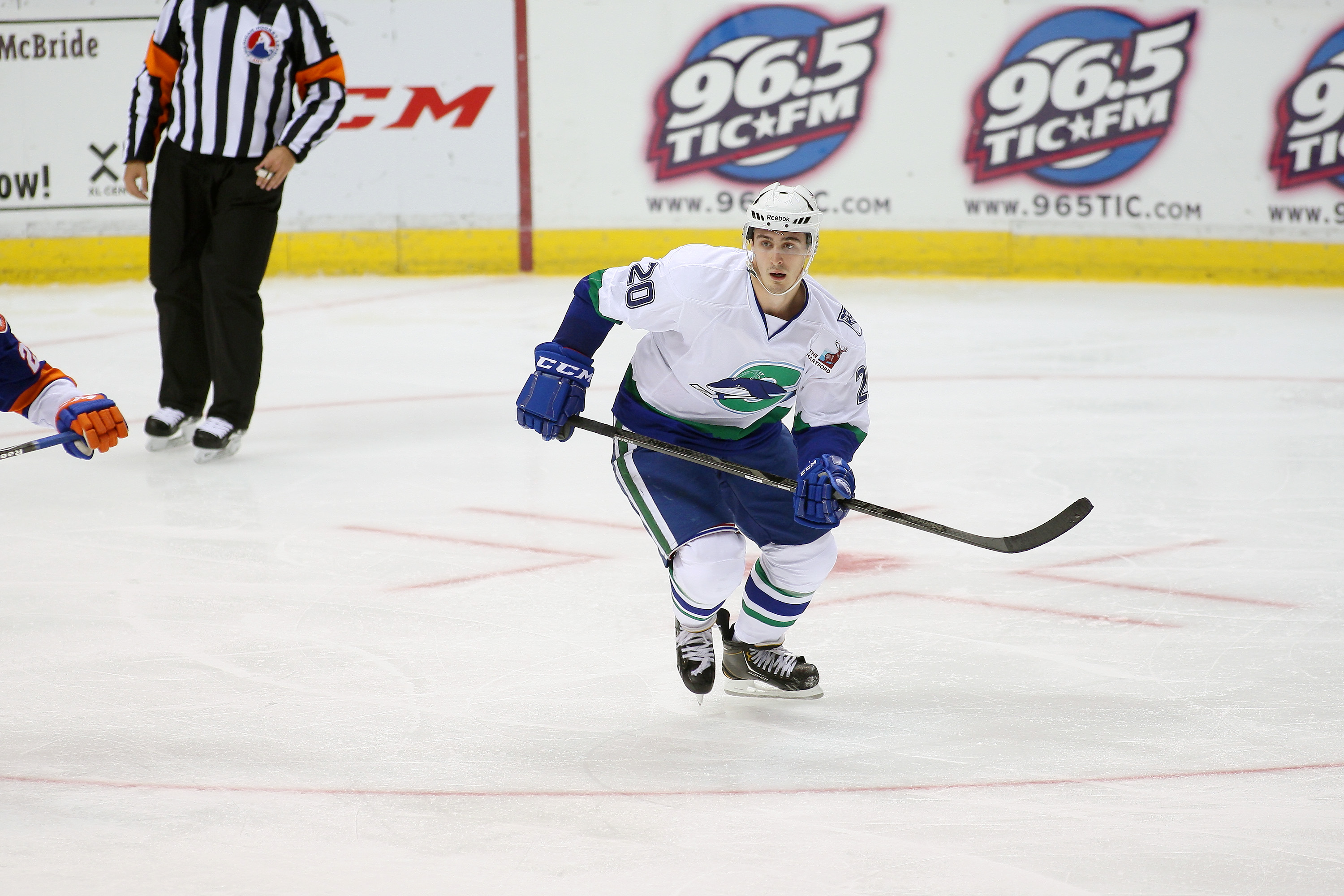
Kreider with the Connecticut Whale in October 2012

Leading up to the lockout-shortened 2012–13 season, Kreider was expected to begin his rookie year playing on the Rangers' second line alongside Derek Stepan and captain Ryan Callahan with occasional time on the top line with Brad Richards and newcomer Rick Nash. Prior to the start of training camp, Kreider participated in the National Hockey League Players' Association Rookie Showcase. However, due to the 2012–13 NHL lockout, Kreider began the season playing on the Rangers' American Hockey League (AHL) affiliate, the Connecticut Whale. He made his debut for the team on October 12, 2012, in a 6–4 loss to the Bridgeport Sound Tigers. He scored his first career AHL regular season goal later that month on October 27 against the Providence Bruins. By December 3, Kreider had accumulated four goals and six assists in 19 games for the Whale. He improved to five goals and seven assists for 12 points through 22 games by the time the NHL resumed play in January. However, after going pointless in his first three NHL regular season games, Kreider served as a healthy scratch for their game against the Philadelphia Flyers. In his third game of the season, he originally started on the Rangers second line with captain Ryan Callahan and Derek Stepan but was quickly demoted to the fourth line and played only 7:21 of ice time. After the demotion, Kreider served as a healthy scratch and head coach John Tortorella debated sending him back to the AHL. Shortly after serving as a healthy scratch, it was revealed that Kreider had suffered a bone chip in his ankle. He subsequently missed five games before returning to the Rangers lineup on February 5. In his first game back, Kreider recorded his first career regular season NHL goal in a 3–1 loss to the New Jersey Devils. He later recorded his first career regular season assist on February 7 against the New York Islanders. During his short time at the NHL level, Kreider also accidentally crashed into Ottawa Senators goaltender Craig Anderson and sidelined him for 18 games. Kreider served as a healthy scratch after playing in four consecutive games and was reassigned to the AHL on February 15. However, he was recalled the following day as a possible replacement for Rick Nash. Although he did not play that night, he played in the following four games but saw his ice time diminish from 14:37 to 4:43. After being sent back to the AHL on February 28, Kreider accumulated six goals and one assist in eight games for Connecticut before being recalled for the third time on March 20. He remained in the NHL for a short while before returning to the AHL on April 3. He spent six games in the AHL, tallying one goal and three assists to maintain tied for sixth on the team in goals and third on the team with six power-play goals. His efforts were recognized by the Rangers coaching staff and he was recalled to the NHL on April 17. Kreider finished his rookie season with the Rangers having accumulated two goals and an assist over 23 games. Although he tallied more points in the AHL, Kreider struggled offensively and scored just 12 points in 33 games for the Whale.

As the Rangers qualified for the 2013 Stanley Cup playoffs, Kreider rejoined the team to help them clinch their Eastern Conference quarterfinals series over the Washington Capitals. He played in game one against the Capitals before serving as a healthy scratch for games two to five. Kreider returned to the Rangers lineup for games six and seven as the Rangers shutout the Capitals and qualified for the Eastern Conference semifinals against the Boston Bruins. Although he had only registered an assist in one out of six games for the Rangers, Kreider saw increased playing time throughout their series against the Bruins. In game three, Kreider was promoted to the second line with Rick Nash and Derick Brassard late in the second period before he suffered a facial injury. He was again inserted into the lineup for game four in place of Brad Richards where he then scored the overtime game-winning goal to force a game five. Kreider finished game four with a postseason-high 18 shifts and 13:50 of ice time. After the Rangers were eliminated in game five, the team fired Tortorella as their head coach.

===== 2013–2014 =====
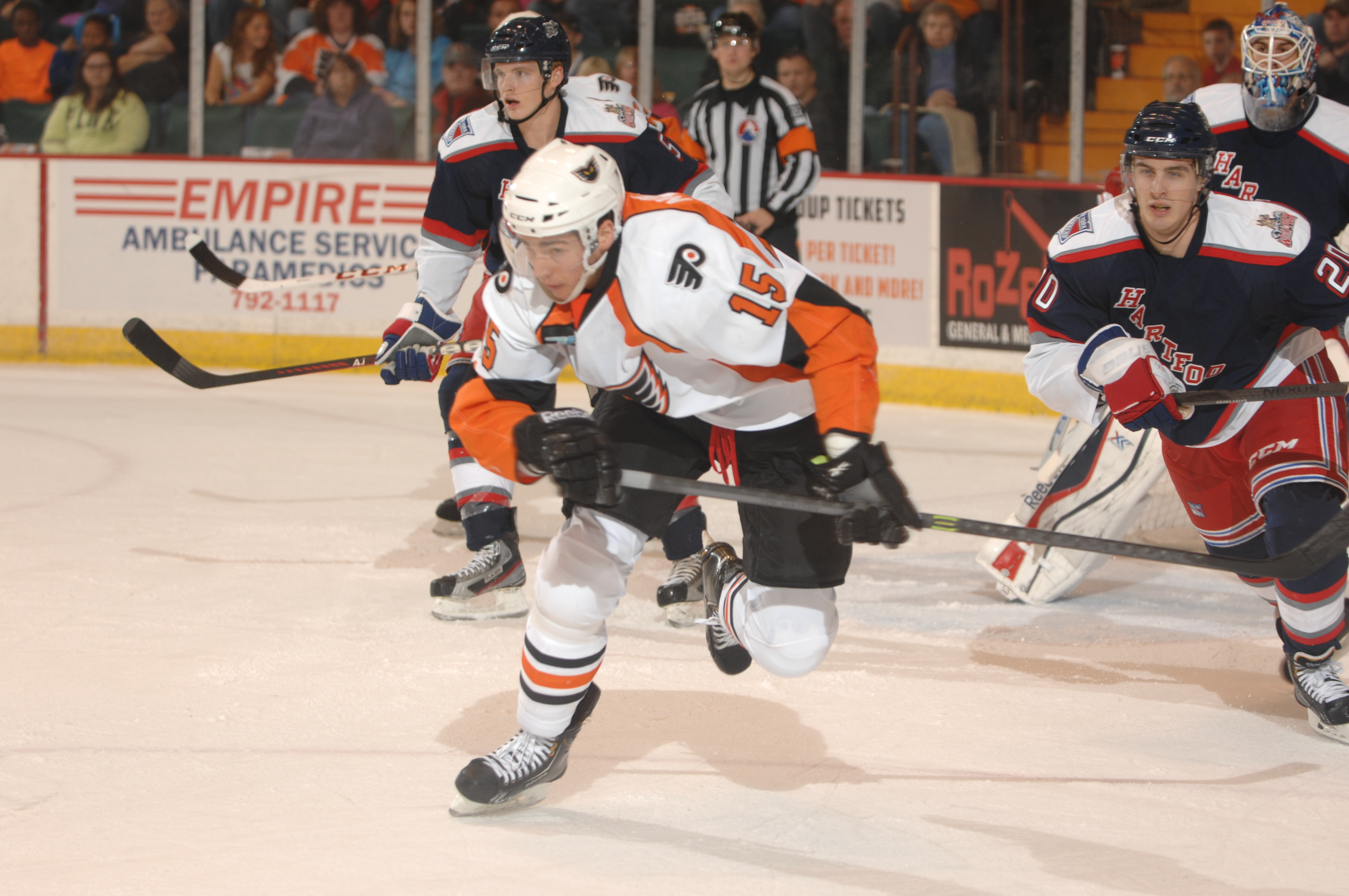
Kreider (right) while with the Hartford Wolf Pack in October 2013

Kreider returned to the Rangers' training camp ahead of the 2013–14 season but was reassigned to the AHL, the Whale having changed their name to the Hartford Wolf Pack, to begin the season. During the Wolf Pack's opening weekend, Kreider tallied a goal and an assist. He added another goal and assist over the following five games before being recalled to the NHL level as the Rangers were struggling to produce offensively. Under new head coach Alain Vigneault, Kreider thrived and began to produce points at a rapid pace. In his first seven games with the Rangers, Kreider scored two goals and four assists. As he became a mainstay on a line with Derek Stepan and Mats Zuccarello, Kreider tallied two goals and six assists through 10 games while the Rangers enjoyed a record of 7–3–0. Although he was praised for being a physical force, he narrowly avoided supplemental discipline for cross-checking Scottie Upshall during a game against the Florida Panthers. On November 2, Kreider and Zuccarello assisted on all three of Stepan's goals in the Rangers' 5–1 win. This marked the sixth time since the start of the 2005–06 season that a trio accounted for all of the scoring on a hat trick. On November 30, Kreider recorded his first career NHL hat trick to lift the Rangers to a 5–2 win against former head coach John Tortorella and the Vancouver Canucks. He subsequently became the third Rangers rookie in the last 20 years to record a hat trick and finished the month tied for second among NHL rookies with 16 points. By December 18, Kreider had accumulated 18 points over 27 games as he became a consistent left winger on the Rangers' top line. He continued to improve as the season continued and quickly became a frontrunner to win the Calder Memorial Trophy as the NHL's rookie of the year. By early January, Kreider had accumulated 11 goals and 24 points with a plus-9 rating through 37 games while also leading all Rangers forwards with 93 hits. Although he had only added three points by mid-February, Kreider helped his new linemate Rick Nash score goals by assisting on three of his seven goals over an eight-game period. By the start of February, Kreider had accumulated 13 goals, 17 assists, 62 penalty minutes, and 105 shots on goal. Throughout February and March, Kreider added seven more points along with 72 penalty minutes and a plus-14 rating through 66 games. He was also tied for the team lead with six power-play goals, second in goals, and sixth in points. Despite suffering a hand injury on March 21, Kreider played 10 minutes of ice time in the following two games before undergoing surgery on March 28. While Kreider was recovering from his hand injury, newly acquired Martin St. Louis replaced him on the top line with Nash and Stepan.

Kreider returned to the Rangers' lineup in game four of their 2014 second round series against the Pittsburgh Penguins on May 7. Upon rejoining his former line, Kreider made an immediate impact by tallying a goal and an assist in game five to push the series to game six and eventually eliminate the Penguins. During game one of the Eastern Conference final against the Montreal Canadiens, Kreider injured goaltender Carey Price when he crashed into his net in the second period. This resulted in Price sustaining a sprained knee and caused him to miss the remainder of the playoffs. In game five of the series, Kreider established numerous single-game playoff career-highs with three assists, four points, and six shots on goal. He subsequently became the first Ranger to record three points in one period of a playoff game since Jaromír Jágr in 2007. The Rangers won the series and they met with the Los Angeles Kings in the 2014 Stanley Cup Final. Heading into the Cup Final, Kreider was on a point-per-game pace with 10 points over 10 games. Although Kreider scored a goal in game five of the Cup Final, the Kings won the Stanley Cup over the Rangers.

===== 2014–2015 =====
On July 23, 2014, Kreider and the Rangers agreed to a contract extension worth $4.95 million over two years. Kreider returned to the Rangers for the 2014–15 season with the expectation of playing on their top line with Rick Nash and Derek Stepan. Upon making the Rangers' opening night roster, Kreider tallied a goal and an assist in the season opener on October 9 to clinch a 3–2 win over the St. Louis Blues. His production continued throughout the month and he quickly accumulated two goals, four assists, a plus-5 rating and 23 penalty minutes over the first seven games of the season. Beyond points, Kreider also began developing a reputation for his physical style of play. On October 27, he was assessed a major penalty and game misconduct after boarding Jonas Brodin of the Minnesota Wild during a game. Between November 9 and December 29, Kreider had recorded only one goal over 19 games. During this time, he also missed a game due to neck spasms caused by a collision with a teammate during practice. Through December, the Rangers maintained a 13–1–0 record, their best 14-game stretch since January 7 to February 10, 1973. Over the first six games in January, Kreider improved to three goals, two assists and five points. Kreider finished the 2014–15 season with 21 goals and 25 assists for 46 points, including a plus-24 rating in 80 games to help the Rangers win the Presidents' Trophy as the regular season champions.

Throughout the first 11 games of the 2015 Stanley Cup playoffs, Kreider was tied with Brassard for team lead with five goals. They were eventually eliminated after being shutout in game seven of the Eastern Conference final by the Lightning. He finished the postseason with seven goals and two assists for nine points over 19 games.

===== 2015–2016 =====
The 2015–16 NHL season was the shortest of Kreider's professional career, as he missed three games due to injuries and the Rangers were eliminated early in the playoffs. Kreider and the Rangers struggled from the start of the season, with Kreider only scoring three goals through 24 games. At the end of November, he took on responsibility for their losses and his poor play by saying: "It [2015–16 season] has been about as bad as it can be, and it is nobody's fault but my own. Everyone in here has been supportive, the coaches have given me every opportunity in every way." Shortly thereafter, Kreider began skating with different linemates, including Oscar Lindberg and Rick Nash, after his usual centreman sustained an injury. Kreider missed a game in early January following a hand laceration and another later that month due to neck spasms. Kreider scored his 20th goal of the season on April 4, 2016, to help the Rangers qualify for the 2016 Stanley Cup playoffs. However, the team was eliminated in the Eastern Conference first round for the first time since the 2010–11 season.

===== 2016–2017 =====
On July 22, 2016, Kreider signed a four-year, $18.5 million contract extension with the Rangers, avoiding arbitration. In the first year of his new contract, Kreider set new career highs in goals and points while matching his career-best in assists. During the Rangers' preseason, Kreider developed chemistry while paired with Mika Zibanejad and rookie right wing Pavel Buchnevich (known as the KZB line). His dominance continued into the season as Kreider opened the season by tallying a goal, an assist, seven shots on goal, and four hits in the Rangers' 5–3 season opener against the New York Islanders. By October 17, Kreider, Zibanejad, and Buchnevich had combined for three goals and six assists over two games. After tallying his third goal and an assist in as many games, Kreider became the first Rangers player with at least six points in the first three games of a season since Brian Leetch in the 1992–93 season. He also became the first Rangers player to have three multi-point games in the first three games of the season since Bernie Nicholls in the 1990-91 NHL season. Kreider later credited his early success to spending more time working out during the summer. He produced seven points in five games before neck spasms forced him to miss the final four games of the month. In his first five games back from injury, Kreider's line struggled to match their previous offensive abilities. As such, head coach Alain Vigneault decided to split up the line ahead of a four-game road trip. As a result of the change, Kreider gained new linemates Rick Nash and Derek Stepan before missing two games due to neck spasms. At the time of the injury, he had accumulated three goals and eight assists in 11 games. Although he was collecting assists, Kreider struggled to score upon returning to the lineup. He scored his first goal since October 17 during a game against the Florida Panthers on November 20. By the end of November, Kreider had recorded a point in 10 of 19 games he had played, including an assist in nine different contests. However, he soon experienced another lengthy goal drought despite being reunited with his linemates Derek Stepan and Mats Zuccarello. The six game drought was snapped in a 4–2 win over the Carolina Hurricanes on December 3. During the game, Kreider and his linemates combined for three goals and four assists for seven points, all at even strength. Over their next three games together, Kreider, Stepan, and Zuccarello combined for four goals and seven assists with each player registering at least three points. By December 16, Kreider was one of only two NHL players who had registered at least 50 goals, 100 points, a plus-30 rating, and 150 penalty minutes since the start of the 2014–15 season. On December 31, Kreider tallied his second career hat trick and tied his single-game career-high with three points. He also tied with Pittsburgh Penguins forward and captain Sidney Crosby for the NHL lead in goals in December while also leading the Rangers in multi-point games. As a result of his productive December, Kreider was recognized as the NHL's Second Star of the Week.

The Kreider-Stepan-Zuccarello line continued to find success through the second half of the season. By mid-January, they had tallied 15 goals and 23 assists through 10 games and recorded at least 12 points in those 10 contests. Kreider received his first supplemental discipline from the league on January 18, 2017, when he was fined $5,000 for hitting Dallas Stars forward Cody Eakin with his helmet. Kreider finished the month with 22 points over the last 26 games, including 14 points in the last 15 contests, to rank second on the team in goals. On February 2, he registered his first career overtime winning goal in the regular season to lift the Rangers over the Buffalo Sabres. The game-winning goal was also his 20th of the season and he subsequently became the only Ranger to record at least 20 goals in each of the last three seasons. On February 9, he tallied his 22nd goal of the season to establish a new career high in goals and extend his point streak to a career-best five games. On February 19, Kreider tallied an assist on the game-winning goal against the Washington Capitals while skating in his 300th career NHL game. Kreider began March strong by tallying three goals and three assists over his first six games. By March 13, he led the team in goals and was one of three NHL players to have recorded at least 26 goals and 100 hits over the 2016–17 season. He later scored the game-winning goal on April 2 to help the Rangers secure at least the first wild card spot in the Eastern Conference for the 2017 Stanley Cup playoffs. He finished the regular season tying his career high with 25 assists while establishing new career highs with 28 goals and 53 points. Kreider and the Rangers faced off against the Montreal Canadiens in the Eastern Conference first round. In game five, Kreider tallied an assist on the game-winning goal in overtime while skating in his 70th career playoff game with the Rangers. He subsequently tied Mark Messier and Jeff Beukeboom for 11th place on the Rangers' all-time playoff games played list. After eliminating the Canadiens, Kreider and the Rangers met with the Ottawa Senators in the Eastern Conference second round. During game three of their series, Kreider passed Carl Hagelin for sole possession of 10th place on the franchise's all-time playoff games played list. He finished the series with three goals as the Rangers fell to the Senators in six games. Ahead of the 2017 NHL expansion draft, Kreider was protected by the team and thus ineligible to be drafted by the Vegas Golden Knights.

===== 2017–2018 =====
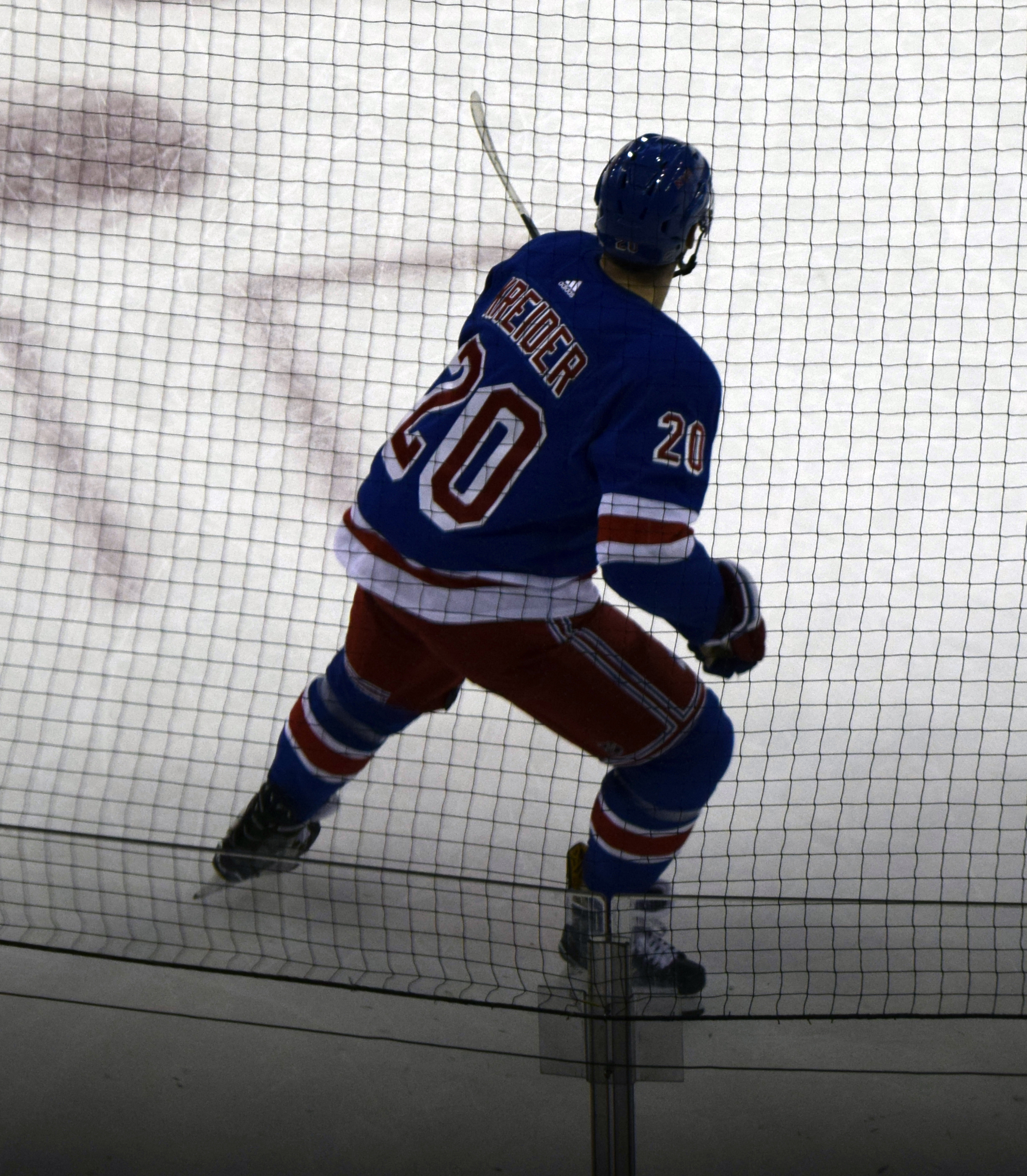
Kreider playing against the Washington Capitals on December 27, 2017

Leading up to the 2017–18 season, Rangers head coach Alain Vigneault spoke about wishing to see more consistency in Kreider's game. Although his season was limited due to injuries, Kreider set numerous personal milestones including tallying his 100th NHL assist, his 100th NHL goal, and his 200th NHL point. While playing on the KZB line in November, Kreider accumulated three goals and one assist for four points over seven games while Buchnevich had tallied eight and Zibanejad led with nine. After Mika Zibanejad was sidelined with an injury in late November, Kreider and Buchnevich were joined by David Desharnais as their top line centre. In their debut together on November 28, 2017, against the Florida Panthers, the trio combined for three goals with just over six minutes left to play. As the trio remained together for the remainder of the month and into December, they helped the Rangers to a record of 15–10–2. By December 8, the trio had combined for 13 points and helped Kreider tally his 100th career assist against the Washington Capitals. Kreider later picked up his 200th career point on December 13 and his 100th career goal on December 15. Shortly after reaching these milestones, Kreider was diagnosed with a blood clot in his right arm. The diagnosis came after he began coughing up blood and felt numbness in his arm. Despite this, he played a game against the Washington Capitals on December 27, before being pulled mid-game. Following the diagnosis, Kreider's doctors also discovered a malformed rib which required arthroscopic surgery to clear up the vein. At the time of the diagnosis, Kreider was tied for fourth on the Rangers with 11 goals and 11 assists for 22 points through 37 games. Kreider returned to the Rangers lineup on February 24, 2018, after missing 24 games. As a result of his surgeries and bed rest, Kreider returned to the ice 20 pounds lighter. He made an immediate impact on the Rangers lineup as he tallied three goals and eight assists in his first 12 games back. Over those 12 games, he scored one goal and five assists while playing at full strength. Despite his offensive abilities, the Rangers had dropped out of playoff contention by losing 17 of the 24 games he sat out while recovering. On March 27, he was named the Rangers' nominee for the Bill Masterton Memorial Trophy as the NHL player who "best exemplifies the qualities of perseverance, sportsmanship and dedication to hockey." As the Rangers failed to qualify for the 2018 Stanley Cup playoffs, Kreider competed with United States senior team at the 2018 World Championship.

===== 2018–2019 =====
Prior to the 2018–19 season, the Rangers replaced Alain Vigneault as head coach with David Quinn. Quinn had previously worked with Kreider during his three years at Boston College. Following the preseason, Kreider, Zibanejad, Jesper Fast, Mats Zuccarello, and Marc Staal were named assistant captains. Kreider began the season strong, leading all Rangers with 19 goals while on pace to best his career-high 28. On November 15, 2018, he scored two power-play goals in his 400th career NHL game as the Rangers fell 7–5 to the Islanders. By the end of December, Kreider had established his fourth career 20-goal season, becoming the fifth-fastest Ranger to reach this milestone. On December 31, Kreider passed Wayne Gretzky on the Rangers' all-time points list with his 250th career point as a Ranger. While playing on a new line with Mika Zibanejad and Mats Zuccarello through January, Kreider led the Rangers in goals with 22 and ranked second on the team in points with 37. From January 12 to February 10, the Kreider–Zibanejad–Zuccarello line combined for 19 goals and 22 assists. On February 24, 2019, Kreider and Jimmy Vesey combined to score two goals in the first 21 seconds into a period for the second time in Rangers franchise history. However, Kreider's production quickly began to slump throughout the month and he was eventually demoted to the Rangers' fourth line. While experiencing a goalless drought, Kreider was also sidelined with a hamstring injury following a game against the Tampa Bay Lightning on February 27. Kreider slowly began developing out of his slump as he established a career-high in shots on goal while also averaging a career-high in time on ice per game (17:27) through March. On March 14, Kreider was fined $5,000 for elbowing Vancouver Canucks forward Elias Pettersson during a game. Although Kreider had returned from his hamstring injury, the lingering effects limited him to four goals in 27 games starting on February 6. Despite this, he tied an NHL career-high with 28 goals through 79 games.

===== 2019–2020 =====
During the 2019 off-season, the Rangers signed Artemi Panarin and Jacob Trouba to seven-year contracts and Pavel Buchnevich to a two-year contract, leaving Kreider's future with the team questionable. As such, numerous hockey pundits expected him to be traded before the conclusion of the 2019–20 season. Following an injury to Mika Zibanejad at the end of October, Kreider and Buchnevich gained Filip Chytil as their new linemate. As the trio became the Rangers' top line, Kreider experienced a three-game point streak which was snapped on November 4, 2019. However, once Zibanejad returned in late November, Kreider was reunited with the KZB line. Leading up to the NHL trade deadline, Kreider became an attractive trade piece for Stanley Cup contending teams although the Rangers had not made him available to be traded. Although he was not originally selected for the 2020 NHL All-Star Game, an injury to Panarin required Kreider to replace the forward as the Rangers' lone All-Star representative. On February 1, 2020, Kreider suffered a head injury after taking a knee to the head during a game against the Detroit Red Wings. At the time of the injury, Kreider had tallied 18 goals and 35 points through 50 games. Although over a dozen NHL teams were wishing to acquire Kreider, the Rangers signed him to a seven-year, $45.5 million contract extension on February 24. Shortly after signing the contract, Kreider suffered another injury after blocking a shot in a game against the Philadelphia Flyers on February 28. He remained sidelined when the NHL canceled the last three weeks of the regular season due to the COVID-19 pandemic but was expected to return for the expanded 2020 playoffs. At the time of his injury, Kreider had accumulated 24 goals and 21 assists for 45 points through 63 games. Once the NHL resumed play for the Stanley Cup qualifiers, Kreider and the Rangers were swept by the Carolina Hurricanes.

===== 2020–2021 =====
Prior to the start of the COVID-shortened 2020–21 season, Kreider trained with several Rangers players, including first overall pick Alexis Lafrenière, in Connecticut. He also returned as an alternative captain for the team alongside Artemi Panarin, Jacob Trouba, and Mika Zibanejad. Shortly after the start of the season, Kreider scored his 161st NHL career goal during a game against the Pittsburgh Penguins on February 1, 2021. He subsequently became the second American-born player on the Rangers' all-time goal-scoring list behind Brian Leetch. On February 24, he recorded his third career NHL hat trick in a 4–3 loss to the Philadelphia Flyers. A few days later, he recorded his fourth career NHL hat trick in a 6–1 win over the New Jersey Devils on March 4. While Kreider missed three games in April and May due to an undisclosed injury, the Rangers failed to qualify for the 2021 playoffs. On May 18, Kreider was named the Rangers' nominee for the King Clancy Memorial Trophy as a "player who best exemplifies leadership qualities on and off the ice and has made a noteworthy humanitarian contribution in his community."

===== 2021–2022 =====
In the 2021 off-season, the Rangers added Barclay Goodrow, Patrik Nemeth, Ryan Reaves, Sammy Blais, and Jarred Tinordi to their lineup. They also hired former Vegas Golden Knights head coach Gerard Gallant to replace David Quinn as their new head coach. Under the new coach, Kreider bounced back from the previous season and set career-highs in goals and points while matching his career-high in assists. Over the first 14 games of the season, Kreider often played left wing alongside Mika Zibanejad and Sammy Blais before the latter suffered an ACL tear. While playing on this line, Kreider accumulated 12 goals and at least one goal in 10 out of the teams' first 16 games. From October 29 to December 4, Kreider led the team with six goals while Panarin led with 10 assists and 11 points. By December 13, Kreider had accumulated 17 goals to tie for fifth in the NHL with Andrew Mangiapane and Troy Terry. While averaging 2.81 shots on goal per game, on pace to record 52 goals during the season, the Rangers maintained an 18–6–3 record. Through the end of December and early January, Kreider accumulated nine points over five games while tying for the third most power-play points with 16. As a result of his impressive play, Kreider and teammate Adam Fox were named to the 2022 NHL All-Star Game roster. Upon being named, Kreider became the first Rangers forward to play in consecutive All-Star Games since Wayne Gretzky. On January 22, 2022, Kreider scored his fifth career NHL hat trick to lift the Rangers to a 7–3 win over the Arizona Coyotes. As a result of the hat trick, Kreider tied for the NHL lead in goals with Washington Capitals forward and captain Alexander Ovechkin. As he scored on the power-play, Kreider's goal tied Messier for eighth in Rangers franchise history. Over 10 games from January 13 to the All-Star Game, Kreider had scored 12 goals, the most in the NHL during that time stretch.

Following the All-Star Game, Kreider continued his offensive output and set numerous personal and franchise records. On March 15, Kreider scored his 39th goal of the season to give him 400 career NHL points and tie for second in the league. He subsequently became the first active Rangers skater to reach the milestone and the 17th player in franchise history. Kreider also became the first Ranger since Jaromír Jágr in 2005–06 to score 20 or more power play goals in a season and the eighth player in team history to score 20 or more. A few days later, Kreider scored his 42nd NHL goal to tie for 11th most in a single season in franchise history while his 22 power-play goals ranked third. By the end of the month, Kreider and Zibanejad had combined for 37 power play goals overall to tie for the second most combined power-play goals between two Rangers players in a single season. Kreider also scored his 46th goal of the season and 24th on the power play to tie Jágr for the most power play goals in a single season in franchise history and Jean Ratelle for the seventh most single-season goals in team history. On April 5, during a game against the Devils, Kreider recorded his 25th power play goal, the most in a single season in Rangers history, breaking the team's record previously held by Jágr. He also became the first NHL player to reach this milestone since Alexander Ovechkin in 2014–15. In the same game, Kreider also scored his 10th game-winning goal, setting a new franchise record, and tied Messier for the sixth most single-season goals in Rangers history. A few days later on April 11, Kreider scored his 50th goal of the season to become the fourth player in Rangers franchise history to reach this milestone. Kreider also became the 15th player in NHL history to record 50+ goals and 25+ power play goals in a season and he tied Walt Tkaczuk for the 11th most goals in team history. As the Rangers qualified for the 2022 Stanley Cup playoffs, Kreider finished the regular season with 52 goals, 25 assists and 77 points in 81 games. On April 26, Kreider was named the recipient of the Steven MacDonald Extra Effort Award as a Ranger's player who "goes above and beyond the call of duty." He was also nominated for the Bill Masterton Trophy for the second time. On April 27, Kreider was named the recipient of the inaugural Mr. Ranger Award presented in memory of Rod Gilbert.

When Kreider and the Rangers met with the Pittsburgh Penguins in the first round, he continued his progressive pace and set numerous personal and franchise records. After scoring his third and fourth goals of the series in game six, including the game-winner, Kreider became the Ranger with the most playoff game-winning goals in franchise history. Upon scoring a goal in game seven, Kreider tied Messier with the second most playoff goals in Rangers history with 29, moving one past Ron Duguay, Adam Graves, and Brian Leetch. Kreider's line, consisting of Panarin and Zibanejad, finished the first round series combining for 11 goals and 14 assists over seven games. After the team went 2–0 to begin their second-round series against the Carolina Hurricanes, Kreider tallied his 30th career postseason goal to help lift the Rangers to a win and pass Messier for second place on the Rangers' all-time list. As the Rangers faced elimination in game seven, Kreider scored his two goals in his 26th career playoff game to help lift the Rangers to the Eastern Conference final for the first time since 2015. He subsequently became the fourth Rangers skater to record a multi-goal game in a game seven and the first outside of the 1992 division semifinals. In game three of their series against the Tampa Bay Lightning, Kreider scored his 10th goal of the playoffs and 34th career playoff goal, tying Rod Gilbert for the most in franchise history. Kreider's goal was also his 12th career power-play goal in the Stanley Cup Playoffs, tying Brian Leetch for the second most in Rangers history. Kreider finished the series with 100 career playoff game, joining Marc Staal and Dan Girardi as the only skaters to hit the mark with the Rangers. He also finished the season with a combined 62 goals in the playoffs and regular season, tying Adam Graves for the most in franchise history.

===== 2022–2023 =====
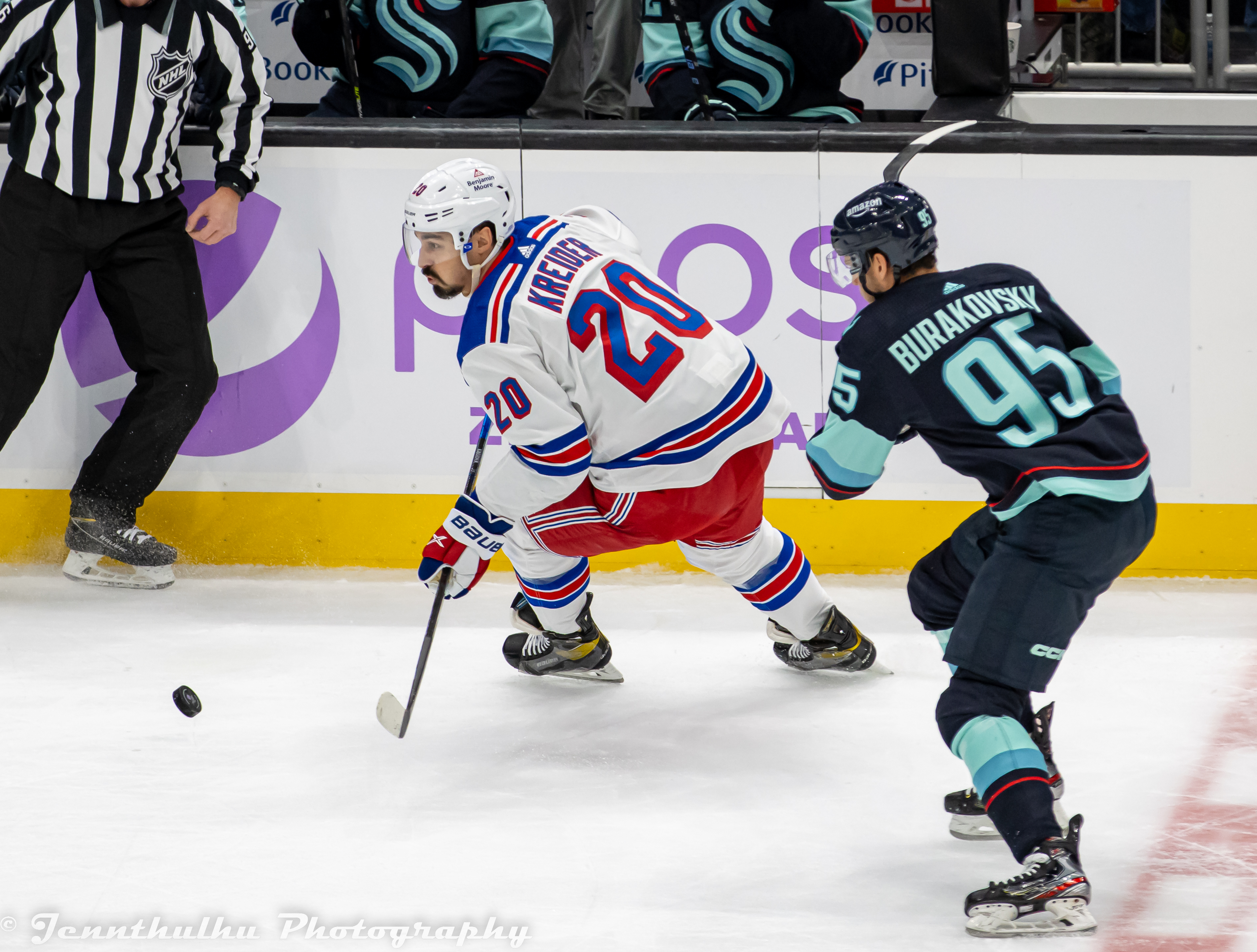
Kreider during a game against the Seattle Kraken in November 2022

Following their elimination from the 2022 playoffs, the Rangers named Jacob Trouba as their 28th captain in team history with Kreider, Panarin, Goodrow and Zibanejad serving as his alternate captains. On November 1, 2022, Kreider scored his 35th career game-winning goal, tying Steve Vickers for the eighth most game-winning goals in franchise history. On December 13, he surpassed Brian Leetch for the ninth most goals in Rangers history and became the all-time leading goal scorer among American-born Rangers. On January 10, 2023, Kreider surpassed Vickers for the eighth most in Rangers history with 247. He also tied with Adam Graves for the seventh most game-winning goals in franchise history. Shortly after reaching this milestone, Kreider missed three consecutive games to recover from an upper body injury. He returned to the Rangers lineup on January 19 where he played 18:24 and had three shots on goal in their 3–1 loss to the Boston Bruins. Despite the injury, Kreider continued to climb the Rangers' all-time leader board and quickly surpassed Camille Henry for the sixth most goals in franchise history. He finished the regular season surpassing Vic Hadfield for the fifth most in Rangers history with his 263rd career point. Kreider and the Rangers met with the Devils in the first round of the 2023 playoffs. In game one, Kreider became the Rangers' all-time leading playoff goal scorer and powerplay goal scorer, notching his 36th and 14th respectively. Five days after they were eliminated by the Devils, the Rangers fired head coach Gerard Gallant and replaced him with Peter Laviolette. The Rangers also gained numerous unrestricted free agents including Blake Wheeler and goaltender Jonathan Quick.

===== 2023–2024 =====
Throughout the 2023–24 season, Kreider set numerous personal and franchise scoring records. He opened the season strong by tallying seven goals in his first 10 games. On November 4, Kreider scored his 8th goal of the season and 273rd of his career, surpassing Andy Bathgate for the fourth most in franchise history. After tallying his 10th goal on November 12, Kreider tied Vic Hadfield for the second-most consecutive 10-goal campaigns by a Rangers skater. By the end of November, Kreider had accumulated 11 goals and tied Brian Leetch for the ninth-most goals in Rangers history. Kreider continued to set franchise records through the month of December, starting on December 15 against the Anaheim Ducks. During the game, Kreider passed Adam Graves for the third most goals in Rangers history and recorded his 500th and 501st career NHL point. On January 2, 2024, in a game against the Carolina Hurricanes, Kreider scored his 166th goal at Madison Square Garden and secured the record for most goals scored in that arena. By mid-January, Kreider had also surpassed Camille Henry for the fourth most road goals in franchise history and Adam Graves for 10th most points in team history. On March 16, Kreider played in his 800th career NHL game to become the 10th skater in franchise history to reach the milestone. During the game, he collected one goal and two assists to lead the Rangers over the Pittsburgh Penguins. A few games later, Kreider became the third player in franchise history to score 300 career NHL goals with the team. He finished the regular season with 39 goals and 36 assists for 75 points as the Rangers qualified for the 2024 Stanley Cup playoffs.

Upon skating in game one of the Stanley Cup playoffs, Kreider appeared in his 108th playoff game, moving ahead of Marc Staal for the second-most postseason games played by a Rangers skater. During the Rangers' round one matchup against the Washington Capitals, Kreider became the Rangers' all-time leader in playoff goals, playoff power play goals, and playoff game-winning goals. After sweeping the Capitals in four games, Kreider and the Rangers met with the Carolina Hurricanes in the second round. On May 16, 2024, Kreider scored a natural hat trick in the third period to lead the Rangers to a game six win over the Hurricanes and to the conference finals. This was the first postseason hat trick of his career and the 16th hat trick in Rangers playoff history. Although his efforts helped the Rangers qualify for the Eastern Conference finals, the team fell to the Florida Panthers in six games.

===== 2024–2025 =====
Over the 2024 off-season, the Rangers acquired Reilly Smith with the plan of playing him on a line with Kreider and Mika Zibanejad. Over the course of the 2024–25 season, Kreider saw his offensive production drop, managing twenty goals and only eight assists in 68 games. It was a disappointing season for the Rangers, who did not qualify for the 2025 Stanley Cup playoffs, and with the team facing significant salary cap constraints, it was widely rumored that the team would seek to trade him in the 2025 off-season.

==== Anaheim Ducks ====
On June 12, 2025, Kreider was traded by the Rangers, alongside a fourth-round pick in the 2025 NHL draft, to the Anaheim Ducks in exchange for prospect Carey Terrance and a 2025 third-round pick. Kreider returned to the form typically seen during his prime years with the Rangers during his first season with Anaheim, scoring 50 points and helping the Ducks qualify for the playoffs for the first time in eight seasons (since 2018).

In the 2026 off-season, the Ducks faced a difficult salary cap situation due to the need for large new contracts for young stars Leo Carlsson and Cutter Gauthier. General manager Pat Verbeek was reported to have sought to trade Kreider to create cap space, but ultimately the team reached an agreement with Kreider to terminate his contract on September 9, 2026. Kreider cleared waivers the following day, becoming an unrestricted free agent. It was reported that he would seek a return to the NHL's Eastern Conference in order to be closer to his family.

==== Montreal Canadiens ====
On September 12, 2026, Kreider signed a one-year contract with the Montreal Canadiens, that was reported to be worth $2.15 million guaranteed and also included $3.25 million in potential bonuses.

== International play ==
Medal record

Men's ice hockey

Representing the United States

World Championships
Bronze medal – third place	2018 Denmark	

World Junior Championships
Gold medal – first place	2010 Saskatchewan	
Bronze medal – third place	2011 Buffalo	

Kreider has represented the United States country at both the junior and senior levels in international tournaments. He first represented the United States junior team at the 2010 World Junior Championships while a freshman at Boston College. He scored his first goal of the tournament in the second game to help the United States shutout Switzerland 3–0. The following game, Kreider recorded a hat trick in a 12–1 win over Latvia on December 29. He scored a goal to help the United States qualify for the semifinals and then the final. He scored his sixth goal of the tournament in the gold-medal game against Canada. Upon completing his freshman season at Boston College, Kreider was selected to compete with the United States senior team at the 2010 World Championship. Kreider registered one goal and one assist over six games as the team placed 13th.

During his sophomore year at Boston College, Kreider was chosen to represent the United States once again at the 2011 World Junior Championships. Throughout the tournament, Kreider was an impactful player on team's roster as he finished the tournament with four goals and two assists in six games. Two of his four goals came during final contest against Sweden to help the United States team to win back-to-back World Junior Championships medals and the first to win a World Junior Championships medal on home soil. This also brought Kreider's World Juniors Championships goal total to 10 which tied him with John LeClair and Mike Modano for third all-time among American players. Upon completing his second year at Boston College, Kreider was selected to compete with the United States senior team at the 2011 World Championship. Kreider registered three points over seven games as the team placed eighth.

In 2018, Kreider, along with teammate Neal Pionk, were the only Rangers players selected to represent the United States at the 2018 World Championship. Throughout the tournament, Kreider was an impactful player on United States' roster and was named the team's Player of the Game twice. He scored two goals in their game against Canada to help the United States claim their third bronze in six years.

On April 19, 2019, Kreider was selected to represent the United States at the 2019 World Championship. He scored three goals and one assist for four points over eight games as the United States failed to qualify for a medal.

== Personal life ==
Kreider married his wife Francesca in 2023. Although he left Boston College in his junior year, Kreider earned his degree in communications in 2016 by taking courses online and during the off-season. When speaking of his degree, Kreider said: "I put a lot of time and effort to get to a certain point. I was just kind of seeing it through to the end." Beyond English, Kreider is conversational in Spanish and Russian.

He split his time between New York and Massachusetts during the summers growing up. In a 2015 interview with CNBC, he gave his summer reading list which included The Old Man and the Sea by Ernest Hemingway, who he described as a favorite writer of his.

== Career statistics ==
=== Regular season and playoffs ===
			Regular season					Playoffs
Season	Team	League	GP	G	A	Pts	PIM	GP	G	A	Pts	PIM
2005–06	Masconomet Regional High School	HS-MA	19	5	10	15		—	—	—	—	—
2006–07	Masconomet Regional High School	HS-MA	20	28	13	41		—	—	—	—	—
2007–08	Phillips Academy	HS-Prep	24	26	15	41		—	—	—	—	—
2008–09	Phillips Academy	HS-Prep	26	33	23	56	10	—	—	—	—	—
2008–09	Valley Jr. Warriors	EJHL	5	4	2	6		—	—	—	—	—
2009–10	Boston College	HE	38	15	8	23	26	—	—	—	—	—
2010–11	Boston College	HE	32	11	13	24	37	—	—	—	—	—
2011–12	Boston College	HE	44	23	22	45	66	—	—	—	—	—
2011–12	New York Rangers	NHL	—	—	—	—	—	18	5	2	7	6
2012–13	Connecticut Whale	AHL	48	12	11	23	73	—	—	—	—	—
2012–13	New York Rangers	NHL	23	2	1	3	6	8	1	1	2	0
2013–14	Hartford Wolf Pack	AHL	6	2	2	4	16	—	—	—	—	—
2013–14	New York Rangers	NHL	66	17	20	37	72	15	5	8	13	14
2014–15	New York Rangers	NHL	80	21	25	46	88	19	7	2	9	14
2015–16	New York Rangers	NHL	79	21	22	43	58	5	2	0	2	6
2016–17	New York Rangers	NHL	75	28	25	53	58	12	3	1	4	18
2017–18	New York Rangers	NHL	58	16	21	37	44	—	—	—	—	—
2018–19	New York Rangers	NHL	79	28	24	52	57	—	—	—	—	—
2019–20	New York Rangers	NHL	63	24	21	45	58	3	1	1	2	6
2020–21	New York Rangers	NHL	50	20	10	30	34	—	—	—	—	—
2021–22	New York Rangers	NHL	81	52	25	77	24	20	10	6	16	14
2022–23	New York Rangers	NHL	79	36	18	54	26	7	6	3	9	0
2023–24	New York Rangers	NHL	82	39	36	75	26	16	8	4	12	6
2024–25	New York Rangers	NHL	68	22	8	30	24	—	—	—	—	—
2025–26	Anaheim Ducks	NHL	75	22	28	50	34	12	2	5	7	0
NHL totals			958	348	284	632	609	135	50	33	83	84

=== International ===
Year	Team	Event	Result	GP	G	A	Pts	PIM
2010	United States	WJC	1st place, gold medalist(s)	7	6	1	7	2
2010	United States	WC	13th	6	1	1	2	0
2011	United States	WJC	3rd place, bronze medalist(s)	6	4	2	6	0
2011	United States	WC	8th	7	2	1	3	6
2018	United States	WC	3rd place, bronze medalist(s)	10	4	6	10	2
2019	United States	WC	7th	8	3	1	4	2
2025	United States	4NF	2nd	2	1	0	1	0
Junior totals				13	10	3	13	2
Senior totals				33	11	9	20	10

== Awards and honors ==
Award	Year	Ref
College
All-Hockey East Rookie Team	2010	
All-Hockey East Second Team	2012	
NHL
NHL All-Star Game	2020, 2022	
New York Rangers
Steven McDonald Extra Effort Award	2022	
Mr. Ranger Award	2022	

Awards and achievements
Preceded by Michael Del Zotto	New York Rangers first-round draft pick 2009	Succeeded by Dylan McIlrath
