= Mike Allison =

Canadian ice hockey player (born 1961)

- Born: 28 March 1961 (age 65) Fort Frances, Ontario, Canada
- Height: 6 ft 0 in (183 cm)
- Weight: 200 lb (91 kg; 14 st 4 lb)
- Position: Left wing
- Shot: Right
- Played for: New York Rangers; Toronto Maple Leafs; Los Angeles Kings
- NHL draft: 35th overall, 1980; New York Rangers
- Playing career: 1980–1990

Michael Earnest Allison (born 28 March 1961) is a Canadian former ice hockey forward, and the brother of former player and coach Dave Allison.

== Playing career ==
After playing hockey at the junior level for the Kenora Thistles, Allison caught the attention of the Sudbury Wolves, who made him their first draft pick in the 1978 OHL Draft. Playing on the left wing, Allison had an exceptional second season in Sudbury, achieving 95 points, on the strength of 71 assists, and was drafted by the New York Rangers in the second round of the 1980 NHL entry draft. Allison began his National Hockey League career the very next season in 1980–81, and his first season proved to be his most productive. He scored on his very first shot on goal, on 9 October 1980, making him the youngest Rangers player to score in their NHL debut at 19 years and 195 days. His record was surpassed by Lias Andersson in 2018, who was 19 years 164 days old. Two days after his debut, Allison recorded a hat trick against the Toronto Maple Leafs. It would prove to be the only hat trick of Allison's entire career. Playing on a line with Ulf Nilsson and Anders Hedberg for the first half of the season, Allison finished the season as the Rangers' leader in rookie scoring, and established team records for rookie assists (38) and points (64), although the records were surpassed the following season by Mark Pavelich.

Allison played five more seasons for the Rangers, but a series of knee injuries prevented him from playing a full season again while in New York. He was traded from the Rangers to the Maple Leafs for Walt Poddubny on August 18, 1986. For only the second time he played a full NHL season. By this point in his career, knee injuries had made Allison adjust his playing style to be more of a defensive player, often playing killing penalties, and less of an aggressive forward. In spite of this, he still was a strong contributor for the Maple Leafs in the 1986–87 NHL Playoffs. Early in the 1987–88 NHL season Allison was traded to the Los Angeles Kings for Sean McKenna. After playing three more partial seasons with the Kings, Allison retired from the NHL after the 1989–90 NHL season.

== Post-NHL career ==
After his playing career ended, Allison spent one season as an assistant coach at Bemidji State, and later served as an assistant to his brother Dave, who was head coach of the Kingston Frontenacs of the OHL. From 1995 to 1998, Allison spent three seasons providing color commentary on Kings' radio broadcasts, during which time he also became involved with the Kings' youth hockey camp, becoming co-director. In 1999, the two Allison brothers founded their own hockey camp in Fort Frances, A & A Hockey Camps, and Mike Allison served as an instructor there through 2003.

On 27 September 2003, Mike Allison was inducted into the Northwestern Ontario Sports Hall of Fame in Thunder Bay, Ontario.

== Career statistics ==
=== Regular season and playoffs ===
			Regular season					Playoffs
Season	Team	League	GP	G	A	Pts	PIM	GP	G	A	Pts	PIM
1976–77	Kenora Thistles	MJHL	47	23	29	52	64	—	—	—	—	—
1977–78	Kenora Thistles	MJHL	47	30	36	66	70	—	—	—	—	—
1977–78	New Westminster Bruins	WCHL	5	0	1	1	2	—	—	—	—	—
1978–79	Sudbury Wolves	OMJHL	59	24	32	56	41	10	4	2	6	18
1979–80	Sudbury Wolves	OMJHL	67	24	71	95	74	9	8	6	14	6
1980–81	New York Rangers	NHL	75	26	38	64	83	14	3	1	4	20
1981–82	New York Rangers	NHL	48	7	15	22	74	10	1	3	4	18
1981–82	Springfield Indians	AHL	2	0	0	0	0	—	—	—	—	—
1982–83	New York Rangers	NHL	39	11	9	20	37	8	0	5	5	10
1982–83	Tulsa Oilers	CHL	6	2	2	4	2	—	—	—	—	—
1983–84	New York Rangers	NHL	45	8	12	20	64	5	0	1	1	6
1984–85	New York Rangers	NHL	31	9	15	24	17	—	—	—	—	—
1985–86	New York Rangers	NHL	28	2	13	15	22	16	0	2	2	38
1985–86	New Haven Nighthawks	AHL	9	6	6	12	4	—	—	—	—	—
1986–87	Toronto Maple Leafs	NHL	71	7	16	23	66	13	3	5	8	15
1987–88	Toronto Maple Leafs	NHL	15	0	3	3	10	—	—	—	—	—
1987–88	Los Angeles Kings	NHL	37	16	12	28	57	5	0	0	0	16
1988–89	Los Angeles Kings	NHL	55	14	22	36	122	7	1	0	1	10
1989–90	Los Angeles Kings	NHL	55	2	11	13	78	4	1	0	1	2
1989–90	New Haven Nighthawks	AHL	5	2	2	4	14	—	—	—	—	—
NHL totals			499	102	166	268	630	82	9	17	26	135
