= Ron Greschner =

Canadian ice hockey player

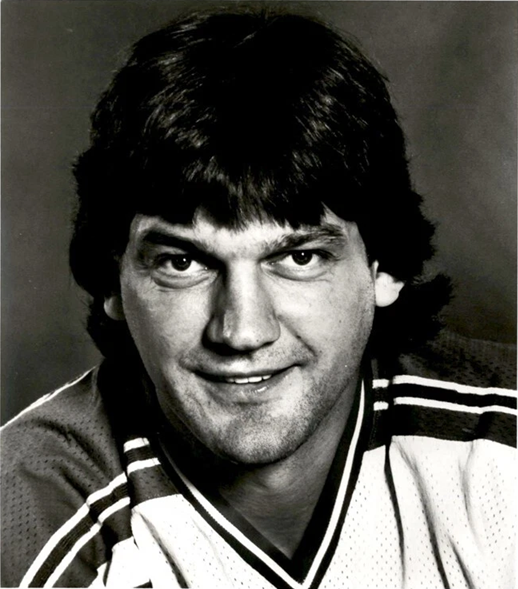
- Greschner in early 1970s photo
- Born: December 22, 1954 (age 71) Goodsoil, Saskatchewan, Canada
- Height: 6 ft 2 in (188 cm)
- Weight: 205 lb (93 kg; 14 st 9 lb)
- Position: Defence
- Shot: Left
- Played for: New York Rangers
- NHL draft: 32nd overall, 1974; New York Rangers
- WHA draft: 34th overall, 1974; Vancouver Blazers
- Playing career: 1974–1990

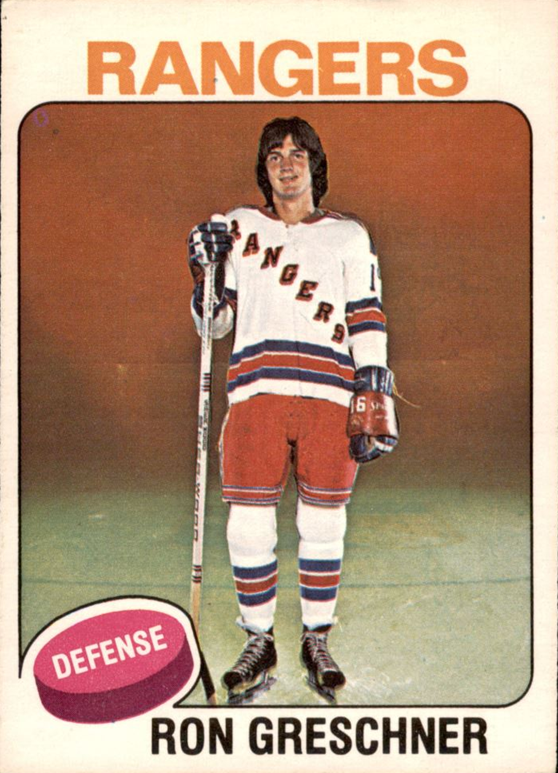
Greschner in 1975-76 card

Ronald John Greschner (born December 22, 1954) is a Canadian former professional ice hockey player. He played as a defenceman in the National Hockey League (NHL) for 16 seasons between 1974 and 1990.

Greschner was selected 32nd overall by the New York Rangers in the 1974 NHL amateur draft. He played in 982 career NHL games, all with the Rangers, scoring 179 goals and 431 assists for 610 points. He also compiled 1,226 penalty minutes, the most in Rangers franchise history. Greschner's best offensive season was in 1977–78 when he recorded 24 goals and 48 assists for 72 points. He was sometimes deployed as a left winger by coach Craig Patrick.

In the 2009 book 100 Ranger Greats, the authors ranked Greschner at No. 12 all-time of the 901 New York Rangers who had played during the team's first 82 seasons.

== Personal life ==
Greschner was previously married to supermodel Carol Alt. He has five children with his wife, Lori; the family lives in West Palm Beach, Florida. He also led the Ron Greschner Foundation to support autism research and awareness.

== Career statistics ==
=== Regular season and playoffs ===
| | | | Regular season | | | | | Playoffs |
| Season | Team | League | GP | G | A | Pts | PIM | GP | G | A | Pts | PIM |
|---|---|---|---|---|---|---|---|---|---|---|---|---|
| 1971–72 | New Westminster Bruins | WCHL | 44 | 1 | 9 | 10 | 126 | 5 | 1 | 2 | 3 | 0 |
| 1972–73 | New Westminster Bruins | WCHL | 68 | 22 | 47 | 69 | 169 | 5 | 2 | 4 | 6 | 19 |
| 1973–74 | New Westminster Bruins | WCHL | 67 | 33 | 70 | 103 | 170 | 11 | 5 | 6 | 11 | 18 |
| 1974–75 | Providence Reds | AHL | 7 | 5 | 6 | 11 | 10 | — | — | — | — | — |
| 1974–75 | New York Rangers | NHL | 70 | 8 | 37 | 45 | 93 | 3 | 0 | 1 | 1 | 2 |
| 1975–76 | New York Rangers | NHL | 77 | 6 | 21 | 27 | 93 | — | — | — | — | — |
| 1976–77 | New York Rangers | NHL | 80 | 11 | 36 | 47 | 89 | — | — | — | — | — |
| 1977–78 | New York Rangers | NHL | 78 | 24 | 48 | 72 | 100 | 3 | 0 | 0 | 0 | 2 |
| 1978–79 | New York Rangers | NHL | 60 | 17 | 36 | 53 | 66 | 18 | 7 | 5 | 12 | 16 |
| 1979–80 | New York Rangers | NHL | 76 | 21 | 37 | 58 | 103 | 9 | 0 | 6 | 6 | 10 |
| 1980–81 | New York Rangers | NHL | 74 | 27 | 41 | 68 | 112 | 14 | 4 | 8 | 12 | 17 |
| 1981–82 | New York Rangers | NHL | 29 | 5 | 11 | 16 | 16 | — | — | — | — | — |
| 1982–83 | New York Rangers | NHL | 10 | 3 | 5 | 8 | 0 | 8 | 2 | 2 | 4 | 12 |
| 1983–84 | New York Rangers | NHL | 77 | 12 | 44 | 56 | 117 | 2 | 1 | 0 | 1 | 2 |
| 1984–85 | New York Rangers | NHL | 48 | 16 | 29 | 45 | 42 | 2 | 0 | 3 | 3 | 12 |
| 1985–86 | New York Rangers | NHL | 78 | 20 | 28 | 48 | 104 | 5 | 3 | 1 | 4 | 11 |
| 1986–87 | New York Rangers | NHL | 60 | 6 | 34 | 40 | 62 | 6 | 0 | 5 | 5 | 0 |
| 1987–88 | New York Rangers | NHL | 51 | 1 | 5 | 6 | 82 | — | — | — | — | — |
| 1988–89 | New York Rangers | NHL | 58 | 1 | 10 | 11 | 94 | 4 | 0 | 1 | 1 | 6 |
| 1989–90 | New York Rangers | NHL | 55 | 1 | 9 | 10 | 53 | 10 | 0 | 0 | 0 | 16 |
| NHL totals | | | 981 | 179 | 431 | 610 | 1,226 | 84 | 17 | 32 | 49 | 106 |

== Awards and honours ==
- Western Canada Hockey League All-Star Team – 1974

Sporting positions
| Preceded by Barry Beck | New York Rangers captain 1986–1987 | Succeeded by Kelly Kisio |
