= Bill Fairbairn =

Canadian ice hockey player

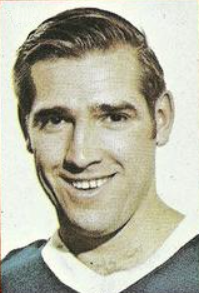
- Fairbairn in 1971 sticker
- Born: January 7, 1947 (age 79) Brandon, Manitoba, Canada
- Height: 5 ft 10 in (178 cm)
- Weight: 170 lb (77 kg; 12 st 2 lb)
- Position: Right Wing
- Shot: Right
- Played for: New York Rangers; Minnesota North Stars; St. Louis Blues
- Playing career: 1967–1979

William John "Bulldog" Fairbairn (born January 7, 1947) is a Canadian former professional ice hockey right wing who played 10 seasons in the National Hockey League (NHL). Fairbairn played most of his career with the New York Rangers, later played for the Minnesota North Stars and St. Louis Blues, and retired early in the 1978-79 NHL season having accumulated 162 goals in his career.

== Playing career ==
Bill Fairbairn's hockey career began with his hometown's Brandon Wheat Kings, then of the Manitoba Junior Hockey League (MJHL), where he picked up he nickname "Bulldog" for his tenacious play. He appeared in 4 games in 1963-64, as well as in 2 games for the Western playoffs for the 1964 Memorial Cup. Fairbairn scored 315 points over the next 3 seasons in Brandon, including 142 (with 60 goals) in 1966-67 playing alongside Juha Widing and Erv Zeimer, earning all-star honours in the process. Signed by the New York Rangers in 1964, Fairbairn earned a 3-game appearance with Rangers affiliate the Omaha Knights of the Central Professional Hockey League (CHL) in 1967. That Spring, Fairbairn was loaned to the Port Arthur Marrs of the Thunder Bay Junior Hockey League to play for them in the 1967 Memorial Cup. Fairbairn then played the next 2 seasons with Omaha, earning Second Team all-star in 1968-69.

Fairbairn made the Rangers roster as a rookie in the 1969-70 season, during which he scored 23 goals and finished second to Tony Esposito in balloting for the Calder Memorial Trophy for rookie of the year. Replacing the injured Bob Nevin, Fairbairn joined a line with left wing Dave Balon and center Walt Tkaczuk, a combination which became known as the "Bulldog Line". The trio combined for 203 points that season, out scoring the Rangers' famed Goal-A-Game, or "GAG Line". After the line had a particularly productive November, including a game against Boston in which the line accounted for 4 goals and 10 points, Rangers' general manager Emile Francis decided to keep the line together, even after Nevin recovered from his injury. Fairbairn went on to play 8 seasons in New York. Linemate Balon was traded to Vancouver in 1971-72, temporarily placing the Bulldog line on hiatus; the name was resurrected the following season when rookie Steve Vickers joined the team. Playing alongside Tkaczuk and Vickers, Fairbairn had his most successful year as a pro, with a career high of 30 goals, and he led the Rangers in scoring in the playoffs that season as well. Fairbairn remained a steady winger for the Rangers until being traded, along with Nick Beverley, to Minnesota for Bill Goldsworthy in November 1976. He split his final 3 seasons between the North Stars and the Blues, retiring in November 1979.

Bill Fairbairn is remembered by former Ranger goalie Gilles Villemure as a hard working, grinding player, a defensive forward who was effective killing penalties. Ranger legend Rod Gilbert said of Fairbairn and teammate Walt Tkaczuk, "In Tkaczuk and Fairbairn we have the best penalty-killers in hockey."

== Career statistics ==
			Regular season					Playoffs
Season	Team	League	GP	G	A	Pts	PIM	GP	G	A	Pts	PIM
1963–64	Brandon Wheat Kings	MJHL	4	1	1	2	2	—	—	—	—	—
1963–64	Brandon Wheat Kings	MC	—	—	—	—	—	2	1	0	1	0
1964–65	Brandon Wheat Kings	SJHL	55	28	31	59	26	9	6	5	11	11
1965–66	Brandon Wheat Kings	SJHL	60	36	76	112	94	11	5	12	17	6
1966–67	Brandon Wheat Kings	MJHL	55	60	82	142	75	13	12	18	30	33
1966–67	Omaha Knights	CPHL	3	0	0	0	2	—	—	—	—	—
1966–67	Port Arthur Marrs	MC	—	—	—	—	—	5	3	4	7	4
1967–68	Omaha Knights	CPHL	70	23	33	56	46	—	—	—	—	—
1968–69	New York Rangers	NHL	1	0	0	0	0	—	—	—	—	—
1968–69	Omaha Knights	CHL	68	28	47	75	63	7	3	6	9	9
1969–70	New York Rangers	NHL	76	23	33	56	23	6	0	1	1	10
1970–71	New York Rangers	NHL	56	7	23	30	32	4	0	0	0	0
1971–72	New York Rangers	NHL	78	22	37	59	53	16	5	7	12	11
1972–73	New York Rangers	NHL	78	30	33	63	23	10	1	8	9	2
1973–74	New York Rangers	NHL	78	18	44	62	12	13	3	5	8	6
1974–75	New York Rangers	NHL	80	24	37	61	10	3	4	0	4	13
1975–76	New York Rangers	NHL	80	13	15	28	8	—	—	—	—	—
1976–77	New York Rangers	NHL	9	1	2	3	0	—	—	—	—	—
1976–77	Minnesota North Stars	NHL	51	9	20	29	2	2	0	1	1	0
1977–78	Minnesota North Stars	NHL	6	0	1	1	0	—	—	—	—	—
1977–78	St. Louis Blues	NHL	60	14	16	30	10	—	—	—	—	—
1978–79	St. Louis Blues	NHL	5	1	0	1	0	—	—	—	—	—
NHL totals			658	162	261	423	173	54	13	22	35	42

== Awards and achievements ==
- MJHL Second All-Star Team (1967)
- CHL Second All-Star Team (1969)
- Inducted into the Manitoba Sports Hall of Fame and Museum in 2007
- "Honoured Member" of the Manitoba Hockey Hall of Fame
