= Steve Vickers (ice hockey) =

Canadian ice hockey player

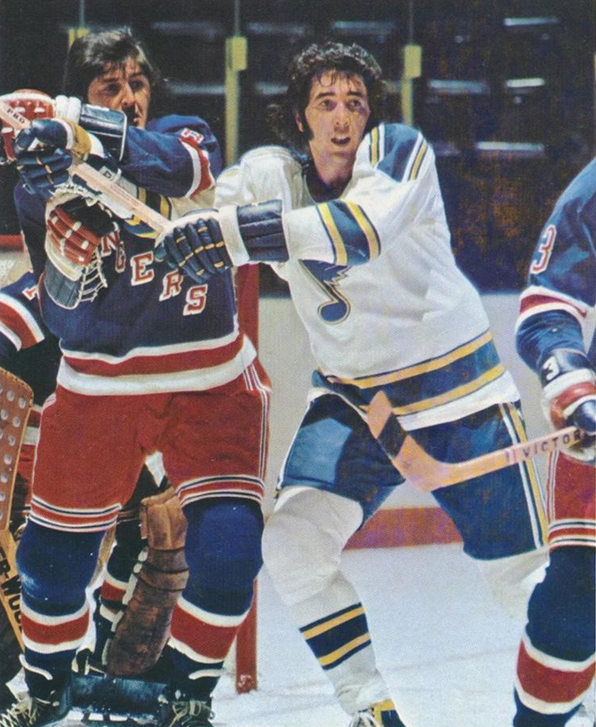
- Vickers (left) with the New York Rangers in 1971
- Born: April 21, 1951 (age 75) Toronto, Ontario, Canada
- Height: 6 ft 0 in (183 cm)
- Weight: 185 lb (84 kg; 13 st 3 lb)
- Position: Left wing
- Shot: Left
- Played for: New York Rangers
- NHL draft: 10th overall, 1971; New York Rangers
- Playing career: 1971–1982

Stephen James Vickers (born April 21, 1951) is a Canadian former professional ice hockey player. He played ten seasons in the National Hockey League (NHL) with the New York Rangers from 1972 to 1982. He won the Calder Memorial Trophy in 1973.

== Playing career ==
Steve "The Sarge" Vickers played junior hockey with the Toronto Marlboros of the Ontario Hockey Association (OHA) and was named a First Team league All-Star. He was drafted 10th overall by the New York Rangers in the 1971 NHL Amateur Draft. He spent a season in the minor leagues with the Omaha Knights of the Central Hockey League before the Rangers called him up in 1972.

Vickers, centre Walt Tkaczuk and winger Bill Fairbairn formed a line that proved to be one of the 1970s' best two-way forward trios. Vickers scored 30 goals and 23 assists for a total of 53 points and was awarded the Calder Memorial Trophy as rookie of the year. He played all of his NHL career with the Rangers, scoring thirty or more goals in each of four seasons. He was later moved to the Rangers' first line with Rod Gilbert and Jean Ratelle. Vickers' best season was 1974–75, when he scored 41 goals and was named to the NHL's Second all-star team. He remained effective until his final season, in which his production dropped sharply; he finished the year in the minor leagues with the Springfield Indians, after which he retired.

Vickers played in the NHL All-Star Game in 1975 and 1976. He made NHL history in 1972 when he became the first rookie, as well as the first New York Ranger, to score hat tricks in two consecutive games (12 November versus the Los Angeles Kings and 15 November versus the Philadelphia Flyers). In February 1976, Vickers set the Rangers team record for most points in a game, with seven, against the Washington Capitals.

== Legacy ==
In the 2009 book 100 Ranger Greats, the authors ranked Vickers at No. 18 all-time of the 901 New York Rangers who had played during the team's first 82 seasons.

== Career statistics ==
=== Regular season and playoffs ===
			Regular season					Playoffs
Season	Team	League	GP	G	A	Pts	PIM	GP	G	A	Pts	PIM
1968–69	Markham Waxers	MetJHL	36	43	40	83	—	—	—	—	—	—
1969–70	Toronto Marlboros	OHA	52	28	38	66	23	11	5	5	10	5
1970–71	Toronto Marlboros	OHA	62	43	64	107	51	13	8	12	20	5
1971–72	Omaha Knights	CHL	70	26	33	59	45	—	—	—	—	—
1972–73	New York Rangers	NHL	61	30	23	53	37	10	5	4	9	4
1973–74	New York Rangers	NHL	75	34	24	58	18	13	4	4	8	17
1974–75	New York Rangers	NHL	80	41	48	89	64	3	2	4	6	6
1975–76	New York Rangers	NHL	80	30	53	83	40	—	—	—	—	—
1976–77	New York Rangers	NHL	75	22	31	53	26	—	—	—	—	—
1977–78	New York Rangers	NHL	79	19	44	63	30	3	2	1	3	0
1978–79	New York Rangers	NHL	66	13	34	47	24	18	5	3	8	13
1979–80	New York Rangers	NHL	75	29	33	62	38	9	2	2	4	4
1980–81	New York Rangers	NHL	73	19	39	58	40	12	4	7	11	14
1981–82	New York Rangers	NHL	34	9	11	20	13	—	—	—	—	—
1981–82	Springfield Indians	AHL	20	4	6	10	14	—	—	—	—	—
NHL totals			698	246	340	586	330	68	24	25	49	58

Preceded by Norm Gratton	New York Rangers first-round draft pick 1971	Succeeded by Steve Durbano
Preceded by Ken Dryden	Winner of the Calder Memorial Trophy; 1973	Succeeded by Denis Potvin
