= Walt Tkaczuk =

Canadian ice hockey player

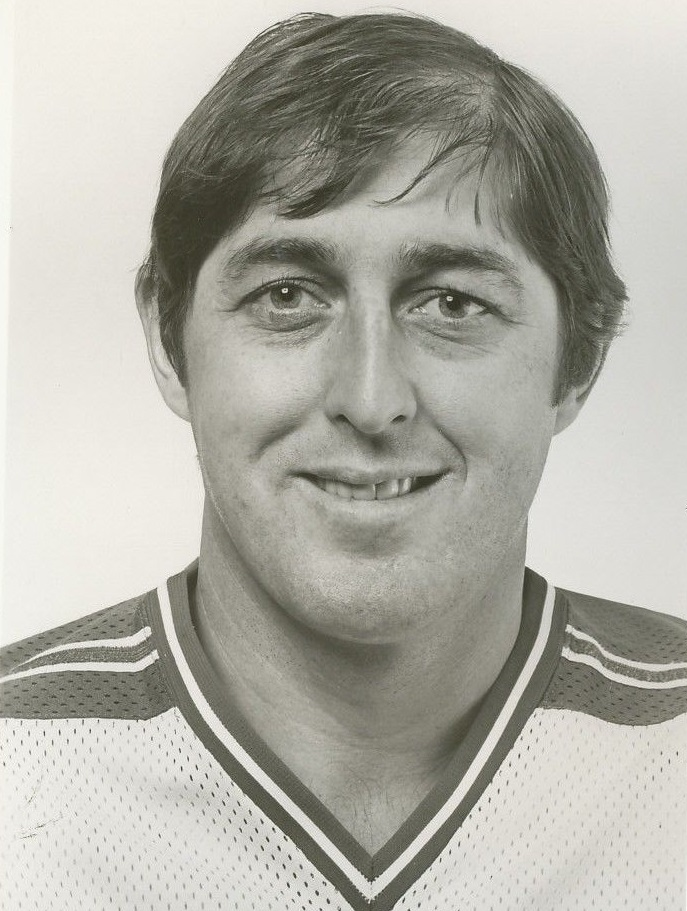
- Tkaczuk with the New York Rangers in 1980
- Born: September 29, 1947 (age 79) Emsdetten, Occupied Germany
- Height: 6 ft 0 in (183 cm)
- Weight: 185 lb (84 kg; 13 st 3 lb)
- Position: Centre
- Shot: Left
- Played for: New York Rangers
- Playing career: 1967–1981

Walter Robert Bogdan Tkaczuk (born September 29, 1947) is a Canadian former ice hockey centre who played fourteen seasons for the New York Rangers of the National Hockey League (NHL) between 1967 and 1981. Tkaczuk's family, originally from Ukraine, moved to Timmins, Ontario from West Germany when he was two years old. He was the first player born in Germany to appear in an NHL game.

== NHL career ==
Tkaczuk centred the "Bulldog Line" with Bill Fairbairn and Dave Balon, who was later replaced by Steve Vickers. He could score his fair share of goals; however, he was much better at producing assists. Tkaczuk's finest contribution to the game was that of the defensive forward, being among the NHL's elite shadows and faceoff men. This complemented the Rangers' high-scoring GAG line of Jean Ratelle, Rod Gilbert, and Vic Hadfield. During his first two seasons with the Rangers, the club and media pronounced his name, "Taychuk" because the Rangers' director of player personnel felt it was easier to say than the correct pronunciation, "Ka-Chook." Prior to the 1969-70 season, the club announced he would henceforth be called by the correct pronunciation.

In the 1972 playoffs, with Ratelle sidelined with a broken ankle and Gilbert hampered by injuries, Tkaczuk played a key role as the Rangers defeated the defending champions Montreal Canadiens, and the previous season's finalists Chicago Black Hawks, to reach the Stanley Cup Finals. While the Rangers lost to the Boston Bruins in six games, Tkaczuk earned much respect for holding the Bruins' Phil Esposito without a goal in the series.

Tkaczuk was asked to play for Team Canada in the 1972 Summit Series but declined the invitation due to his obligation to his summer hockey school. He was replaced by Philadelphia Flyers' centre Bobby Clarke.

In the 1979 playoffs, Tkaczuk was a key contributor as the Rangers upset the first place New York Islanders to reach the Stanley Cup Finals, where they fell to Montreal in five games.

Towards the end of a game on February 2, 1981, Tkaczuk suffered an eye injury when hit by a puck. He never played again. Over his career, Tkaczuk played in 945 NHL games, scoring 227 goals and 451 assists for 678 points, and accumulated 556 minutes in penalties.

In the 2009 book 100 Ranger Greats, the authors ranked Tkaczuk at No. 14 all-time of the 901 New York Rangers who had played during the team's first 82 seasons.

== Post-hockey career ==
Tkaczuk is co-owner of River Valley Golf Course and Tube Slide in St. Marys, Ontario.

== Career statistics ==
=== Regular season and playoffs ===
			Regular season					Playoffs
Season	Team	League	GP	G	A	Pts	PIM	GP	G	A	Pts	PIM
1963–64	Kitchener Dutchmen	CJHL	30	25	37	62	—	—	—	—	—	—
1963–64	Kitchener Rangers	OHA	21	5	5	10	4	—	—	—	—	—
1964–65	Kitchener Dutchmen	CJHL	—	—	—	—	—	—	—	—	—	—
1964–65	Kitchener Rangers	OHA	7	1	2	3	6	—	—	—	—	—
1965–66	Kitchener Rangers	OHA	47	12	31	43	39	19	7	23	30	13
1966–67	Kitchener Rangers	OHA	48	23	47	70	85	13	6	8	14	23
1966–67	Omaha Knights	CPHL	—	—	—	—	—	3	2	0	2	2
1967–68	Kitchener Rangers	OHA	52	37	56	93	81	19	17	20	37	58
1967–68	New York Rangers	NHL	2	0	0	0	0	—	—	—	—	—
1968–69	Buffalo Bisons	AHL	5	2	7	9	9	—	—	—	—	—
1968–69	New York Rangers	NHL	71	12	24	36	28	4	0	1	1	6
1969–70	New York Rangers	NHL	76	27	50	77	38	6	2	1	3	17
1970–71	New York Rangers	NHL	77	26	49	75	48	13	1	5	6	14
1971–72	New York Rangers	NHL	76	24	42	66	65	16	4	6	10	35
1972–73	New York Rangers	NHL	76	27	39	66	59	10	7	2	9	8
1973–74	New York Rangers	NHL	71	21	42	63	58	13	0	5	5	22
1974–75	New York Rangers	NHL	62	11	25	36	34	3	1	2	3	5
1975–76	New York Rangers	NHL	78	8	28	36	56	—	—	—	—	—
1976–77	New York Rangers	NHL	80	12	38	50	38	—	—	—	—	—
1977–78	New York Rangers	NHL	80	26	40	66	30	3	0	2	2	0
1978–79	New York Rangers	NHL	77	15	27	42	38	18	4	7	11	10
1979–80	New York Rangers	NHL	76	12	25	37	36	7	0	1	1	2
1980–81	New York Rangers	NHL	43	6	22	28	28	—	—	—	—	—
NHL totals			945	227	451	678	556	93	19	32	51	119

Sporting positions
Preceded by Dave Maloney	New York Rangers captain 1980–81	Succeeded by Barry Beck
