= Mark Pavelich =

American ice hockey player (1958–2021)

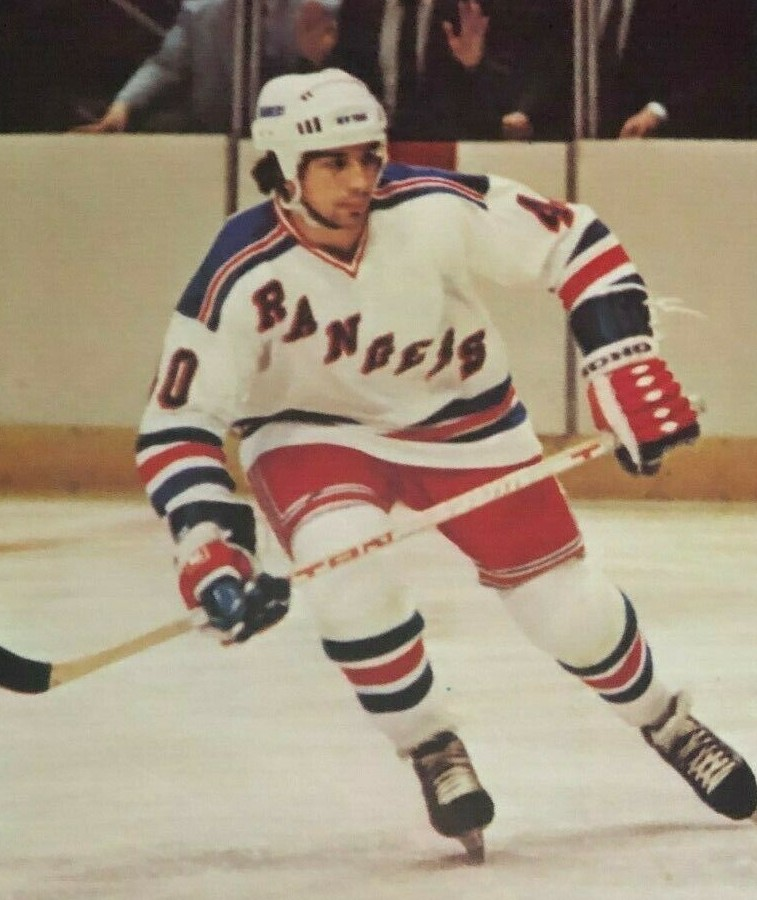
- Pavelich with the New York Rangers in 1986
- Born: February 28, 1958 Eveleth, Minnesota, U.S.
- Died: March 4, 2021 (aged 63) Sauk Centre, Minnesota, U.S.
- Height: 5 ft 8 in (173 cm)
- Weight: 170 lb (77 kg; 12 st 2 lb)
- Position: Center
- Shot: Right
- Played for: HC Lugano; New York Rangers; Minnesota North Stars; Dundee Rockets; HC Bolzano; San Jose Sharks
- National team: United States
- NHL draft: Undrafted
- Playing career: 1980–1991
Medal record
Men's ice hockey
Representing the United States
Olympic Games
Gold medal – first place	1980 Lake Placid	Team competition

Mark Thomas Pavelich (February 28, 1958 – March 4, 2021) was a Croatian-American professional ice hockey forward who played 355 regular season games in the National Hockey League (NHL) for the New York Rangers, Minnesota North Stars, and San Jose Sharks between 1981 and 1991. Pavelich was a member of the "Miracle on Ice" 1980 U.S. Olympic hockey team that won the gold medal.

== Amateur career ==
The son of Croatian immigrants, Pavelich grew up in rural Eveleth, Minnesota. He was a star performer on his high school hockey team, Eveleth High School. He attended the University of Minnesota Duluth for three seasons from 1977 to 1979.

Pavelich was a member of the 1980 U.S. Olympic hockey team that won the gold medal in Lake Placid. In the game against the Soviet Union, Pavelich had two assists, including one on Mike Eruzione's goal which put the team up 4-3.

== Professional career ==
After the Olympics, Pavelich went undrafted. He played one season for HC Lugano in Switzerland where he registered 73 points. He returned to the U.S. national team for the 1981 Ice Hockey World Championship tournament. He was brought back to the United States the following year by his former U.S. Olympic coaches Herb Brooks and Craig Patrick, who managed the New York Rangers. Despite his size, Pavelich thrived in his role as a center for the Rangers, and holds the Rangers record for most points as a rookie (76). However, his career in New York was ended by a feud with Brooks' successor Ted Sator, who introduced a traditional North American dump and chase style of play.

Pavelich briefly played for Brooks with the Minnesota North Stars in 1987 before returning to Europe. He had a stint in Britain for the Dundee Rockets and played two seasons in Italy for HC Bolzano. The expansion San Jose Sharks brought him out of retirement for the 1991–92 NHL season, but he would play only two games for the Sharks before retiring. However, he did record an assist on the Sharks' first-ever goal scored by Craig Coxe in the third period of a 4–3 loss to the Vancouver Canucks on October 4, 1991.

On February 23, 1983, Pavelich became the first American to score five goals in a single game, against the Hartford Whalers at Madison Square Garden. He remained the only American player to do so during his lifetime. This feat has only been matched by an American once when Tage Thompson scored five goals against the Columbus Blue Jackets on December 7, 2022.

== Legacy ==
In the 2009 book 100 Ranger Greats, the authors ranked Pavelich at No. 83 all-time of the 901 New York Rangers who had played during the team's first 82 seasons.

In October 2022, he was inaugurated in the Croatian-American Sports Hall of Fame.

== Personal life ==
Pavelich married Sue Koski on September 11, 1985. The couple had one daughter, Tarja, in 1987 and divorced in 1989. He married Kara Burmachuk in 1994, and they had no children.

When Pavelich was 18, he killed 15-year-old Ricky Holgers in a hunting incident which authorities deemed accidental. His second wife Kara died at age 44 in a fall that authorities deemed accidental from a balcony at their Lutsen, Minnesota, home on September 6, 2012. To "some", the death was "suspicious".

In April 2014, Pavelich put his Olympic medal up for auction, with bidding beginning at $62,500. The medal sold in May 2014 for $262,900 through Dallas-based auction house Heritage Auctions.

=== Health and legal issues ===
Pavelich was arrested on August 15, 2019, for assaulting a neighbor with whom he had earlier been fishing, after he believed the neighbor had put something into his beer. He was charged with four felony counts: second and third degree assault, possession of a short-barreled shotgun, and possession of a firearm with a missing or altered serial number. Pavelich was ruled incompetent to stand trial and was ordered committed to a secure treatment facility. In August 2020, Pavelich was granted court approval for transfer to a lower security setting for treatment. Pavelich's sister, Jean Gevik, stated that she believed he was suffering from chronic traumatic encephalopathy (CTE), and had noticed behavioral changes in the years leading up to the incident which led to his arrest.

Pavelich died on March 4, 2021, at a residential treatment center in Sauk Centre, Minnesota. His death was ruled a suicide by asphyxiation.

== In popular culture ==
In Miracle on Ice, a 1981 TV movie about the 1980 U.S. hockey team, Pavelich was played by Jack Blessing.

In the 2004 Disney film Miracle, he is played by Chris Koch. Koch played junior hockey for the Delta Ice Hawks in his native Canada before concussions ended his career.

== Awards and achievements ==
Award	Year	Ref
All-WCHA First Team	1978–79	
AHCA West All-American	1978–79	

== Career statistics ==
=== Regular season and playoffs ===
			Regular season					Playoffs
Season	Team	League	GP	G	A	Pts	PIM	GP	G	A	Pts	PIM
1975–76	Eveleth High School	HS-MN	—	—	—	—	—	—	—	—	—	—
1976–77	University of Minnesota-Duluth	WCHA	37	12	7	19	8	—	—	—	—	—
1977–78	University of Minnesota-Duluth	WCHA	36	14	30	44	44	—	—	—	—	—
1978–79	University of Minnesota-Duluth	WCHA	37	31	48	79	52	—	—	—	—	—
1979–80	United States National Team	Intl	53	15	30	45	12	—	—	—	—	—
1980–81	HC Lugano	NDA	28	24	25	49	—	—	—	—	—	—
1981–82	New York Rangers	NHL	79	33	43	76	67	6	1	5	6	0
1982–83	New York Rangers	NHL	78	37	38	75	52	9	4	5	9	12
1983–84	New York Rangers	NHL	77	29	53	82	96	5	2	4	6	0
1984–85	New York Rangers	NHL	48	14	31	45	29	3	0	3	3	2
1985–86	New York Rangers	NHL	59	20	20	40	82	—	—	—	—	—
1986–87	Minnesota North Stars	NHL	12	4	6	10	10	—	—	—	—	—
1986–87	Dundee Rockets	BHL	1	0	2	2	0	—	—	—	—	—
1987–88	HC Bolzano	ITA	36	31	44	75	19	8	9	13	22	8
1988–89	HC Bolzano	ITA	44	23	34	57	42	—	—	—	—	—
1991–92	San Jose Sharks	NHL	2	0	1	1	4	—	—	—	—	—
NHL totals			355	137	192	329	340	23	7	17	24	14

=== International ===
Year	Team	Event	GP	G	A	Pts	PIM
1980	United States	OG	7	1	6	7	2
1981	United States	WC	8	2	3	5	4
Senior totals			15	3	9	12	6
