= List of NHL statistical leaders =

The following is a list of NHL statistical leaders.

== Skaters ==
The statistics listed include the 2025–26 NHL regular season and 2026 playoffs.

=== All-time leaders (skaters) ===
==== Regular season: Points ====
Active NHL player
Inducted into the Hockey Hall of Fame
Eligible player not yet inducted into the Hockey Hall of Fame
Not yet eligible for Hockey Hall of Fame consideration (Note: A player is not eligible for induction into the Hockey Hall of Fame until he has been fully retired for three calendar years or is deceased.)

Rank	Name	Team(s)	GP	Pts	PPG
1	Wayne Gretzky	EDM, LAK, STL, NYR	1,487	2,857	1.92
2	Jaromír Jágr	PIT, WSH, NYR, PHI, DAL, BOS, NJD, FLA, CGY	1,733	1,921	1.11
3	Mark Messier	EDM, NYR, VAN	1,756	1,887	1.07
4	Gordie Howe	DET, HFD	1,767	1,850	1.05
5	Ron Francis	HFD/CAR, PIT, TOR	1,731	1,798	1.04
6	Marcel Dionne	DET, LAK, NYR	1,348	1,771	1.31
7	Sidney Crosby	PIT	1,420	1,761	1.24
8	Steve Yzerman	DET	1,514	1,755	1.16
9	Mario Lemieux	PIT	915	1,723	1.88
10	Alexander Ovechkin	WSH	1,573	1,687	1.07
11	Joe Sakic	QUE/COL	1,378	1,641	1.19
12	Phil Esposito	CHI, BOS, NYR	1,282	1,590	1.24
13	Ray Bourque	BOS, COL	1,612	1,579	0.98
14	Joe Thornton	BOS, SJS, TOR, FLA	1,714	1,539	0.90
15	Mark Recchi	PIT, PHI, MTL, CAR, ATL, TBL, BOS	1,652	1,533	0.93
16	Paul Coffey	EDM, PIT, LAK, DET, HFD/CAR, PHI, CHI, BOS	1,409	1,531	1.09
17	Stan Mikita	CHI	1,394	1,467	1.05
18	Teemu Selänne	WIN, ANA, SJS, COL	1,451	1,457	1.00
19	Bryan Trottier	NYI, PIT	1,279	1,425	1.11
20	Adam Oates	DET, STL, BOS, WSH, PHI, ANA, EDM	1,337	1,420	1.06
21	Doug Gilmour	STL, CGY, TOR, NJD, CHI, BUF, MTL	1,474	1,414	0.96
22	Dale Hawerchuk	WIN, BUF, STL, PHI	1,188	1,409	1.19
23	Evgeni Malkin	PIT	1,269	1,407	1.11
24	Patrick Kane	CHI, NYR, DET	1,369	1,400	1.02
25	Jari Kurri	EDM, LAK, NYR, ANA, COL	1,251	1,398	1.12
26	Luc Robitaille	LAK, PIT, NYR, DET	1,431	1,394	0.97
27	Brett Hull	CGY, STL, DAL, DET, PHX	1,269	1,391	1.10
28	Mike Modano	MNS/DAL, DET	1,499	1,374	0.92
29	Johnny Bucyk	DET, BOS	1,540	1,369	0.89
30	Brendan Shanahan	NJD, STL, HFD, DET, NYR	1,524	1,354	0.89
31	Guy Lafleur	MTL, NYR, QUE	1,126	1,353	1.20
32	Mats Sundin	QUE, TOR, VAN	1,346	1,349	1.00
33	Dave Andreychuk	BUF, TOR, NJD, BOS, COL, TBL	1,639	1,338	0.82
33	Denis Savard	CHI, MTL, TBL	1,196	1,338	1.12
35	Mike Gartner	WSH, MNS, NYR, TOR, PHX	1,432	1,335	0.93
36	Pierre Turgeon	BUF, NYI, MTL, STL, DAL, COL	1,294	1,327	1.03
37	Gilbert Perreault	BUF	1,191	1,326	1.11
38	Anže Kopitar	LAK	1,521	1,316	0.87
39	Jarome Iginla	CGY, PIT, BOS, COL, LAK	1,554	1,300	0.84
40	Alex Delvecchio	DET	1,549	1,281	0.83
41	Al MacInnis	CGY, STL	1,416	1,274	0.90
42	Jean Ratelle	NYR, BOS	1,281	1,267	0.99
43	Steven Stamkos	TBL, NSH	1,246	1,256	1.01
44	Peter Šťastný	QUE, NJD, STL	977	1,239	1.27
45	Phil Housley	BUF, WIN, STL, CGY, NJD, WSH, CHI, TOR	1,495	1,232	0.82
46	Norm Ullman	DET, TOR	1,410	1,229	0.87
47	Connor McDavid	EDM	794	1,220	1.54
48	Jean Béliveau	MTL	1,125	1,219	1.08
49	Larry Murphy	LAK, WSH, MNS, PIT, TOR, DET	1,615	1,217	0.75
50	Jeremy Roenick	CHI, PHX, PHI, LAK, SJS	1,363	1,216	0.89

==== Regular season: Points per game ====
Minimum 500 points

1. Wayne Gretzky, 1.921
2. Mario Lemieux, 1.883
3. Connor McDavid, 1.537
4. Mike Bossy, 1.497
5. Bobby Orr, 1.393
6. Marcel Dionne, 1.314
7. Nikita Kucherov, 1.279
8. Peter Šťastný, 1.268
9. Peter Forsberg, 1.250
10. Kent Nilsson, 1.241
11. Phil Esposito, 1.240
12. Sidney Crosby, 1.240
13. Leon Draisaitl, 1.232
14. Nathan MacKinnon, 1.202
15. Guy Lafleur, 1.202
16. Joe Sakic, 1.191
17. Dale Hawerchuk, 1.186
18. Pat LaFontaine, 1.171
19. Steve Yzerman, 1.159
20. Artemi Panarin, 1.149
21. Eric Lindros, 1.138
22. Auston Matthews, 1.132
23. Bernie Federko, 1.130
24. David Pastrňák, 1.120
25. Denis Savard, 1.119

==== Regular season: Goals ====
Active NHL player
Inducted into the Hockey Hall of Fame
Eligible player not yet inducted into the Hockey Hall of Fame
Not yet eligible for Hockey Hall of Fame consideration

Rank	Name	Team(s)	GP	Goals	GPG
1	Alexander Ovechkin	WSH	1,573	929	0.591
2	Wayne Gretzky	EDM, LAK, STL, NYR	1,487	894	0.601
3	Gordie Howe	DET, HFD	1,767	801	0.453
4	Jaromír Jágr	PIT, WSH, NYR, PHI, DAL, BOS, NJD, FLA, CGY	1,733	766	0.442
5	Brett Hull	CGY, STL, DAL, DET, PHX	1,269	741	0.584
6	Marcel Dionne	DET, LAK, NYR	1,348	731	0.542
7	Phil Esposito	CHI, BOS, NYR	1,282	717	0.559
8	Mike Gartner	WSH, MNS, NYR, TOR, PHX	1,432	708	0.494
9	Mark Messier	EDM, NYR, VAN	1,756	694	0.395
10	Steve Yzerman	DET	1,514	692	0.457
11	Mario Lemieux	PIT	915	690	0.754
12	Teemu Selänne	WIN, ANA, SJS, COL	1,451	684	0.471
13	Luc Robitaille	LAK, PIT, NYR, DET	1,431	668	0.467
14	Brendan Shanahan	NJD, STL, HFD, DET, NYR	1,524	656	0.430
15	Sidney Crosby	PIT	1,420	654	0.461
16	Dave Andreychuk	BUF, TOR, NJD, BOS, COL, TBL	1,639	640	0.390
17	Jarome Iginla	CGY, PIT, BOS, COL, LAK	1,554	625	0.402
17	Joe Sakic	QUE/COL	1,378	625	0.454
19	Steven Stamkos	TBL, NSH	1,246	624	0.501
20	Bobby Hull	CHI, WIN, HFD	1,063	610	0.574
21	Dino Ciccarelli	MNS, WSH, DET, TBL, FLA	1,232	608	0.494
22	Jari Kurri	EDM, LAK, NYR, ANA, COL	1,251	601	0.480
23	Mark Recchi	PIT, PHI, MTL, CAR, ATL, TBL, BOS	1,652	577	0.349
24	Mike Bossy	NYI	752	573	0.762
25	Patrick Marleau	SJS, TOR, PIT	1,779	566	0.318

==== Regular season: Goals per game ====
Minimum: 200 goals

1. Mike Bossy, 0.762
2. Mario Lemieux, 0.754
3. Cy Denneny, 0.751
4. Babe Dye, 0.742
5. Pavel Bure, 0.623
6. Auston Matthews, 0.621
7. Wayne Gretzky, 0.601
8. Alexander Ovechkin, 0.591
9. Brett Hull, 0.584
10. Kirill Kaprizov, 0.579
11. Bobby Hull, 0.574
12. Tim Kerr, 0.565
13. Rick Martin, 0.561
14. Phil Esposito, 0.559
15. Maurice Richard, 0.556
16. Cam Neely, 0.544
17. Marcel Dionne, 0.542
18. Pat LaFontaine, 0.541
19. Connor McDavid, 0.515
20. Leon Draisaitl, 0.508
21. David Pastrňák, 0.504
22. Rick Vaive, 0.503
23. Michel Goulet, 0.503
24. Steven Stamkos, 0.501
25. Nels Stewart, 0.498

==== Regular season: Power Play goals ====
1. Alexander Ovechkin, 331
2. Dave Andreychuk, 274
3. Brett Hull, 265
4. Teemu Selänne, 255
5. Luc Robitaille, 247
6. Phil Esposito, 246
7. Steven Stamkos, 242
8. Brendan Shanahan, 237
9. Mario Lemieux, 236
10. Marcel Dionne, 234
11. Dino Ciccarelli, 232
12. Mike Gartner, 217
  Jaromír Jágr, 217
14. Joe Nieuwendyk, 215
15. Keith Tkachuk, 212
16. Gordie Howe, 211
17. Joe Sakic, 205
18. Wayne Gretzky, 204
19. Steve Yzerman, 202
20. Mark Recchi, 200
21. Brian Bellows, 198
22. Jarome Iginla, 197
23. Sidney Crosby, 194
24. Pierre Turgeon, 190
25. Ron Francis, 188

==== Regular season: Short-handed goals ====
1. Wayne Gretzky, 73
2. Mark Messier, 63
3. Steve Yzerman, 50
4. Mario Lemieux, 49
5. Butch Goring, 39
  Dave Poulin, 39
  Jari Kurri, 39
8. Sergei Fedorov, 36
  Brad Marchand, 36
10. Theoren Fleury, 35
  Dirk Graham, 35
12. Pavel Bure, 34
  Derek Sanderson, 34
  Marian Hossa, 34
15. Brian Rolston, 33
  Guy Carbonneau, 33
17. Peter Bondra, 32
  Bobby Clarke, 32
  Joe Sakic, 32
  Dave Keon, 32
21. Bill Barber, 31
  Mats Sundin, 31
23. Bob Pulford, 30
24. Martin St. Louis, 29
  Russ Courtnall, 29
  Craig MacTavish, 29
  Mike Modano, 29
  Esa Tikkanen, 29

==== Regular season: Game-winning goals ====
1. Alexander Ovechkin, 141
2. Jaromír Jágr, 135
3. Gordie Howe, 121
4. Phil Esposito, 118
5. Brett Hull, 110
  Teemu Selänne, 110
7. Patrick Marleau, 109
  Brendan Shanahan, 109
9. Sidney Crosby, 104
10. Jarome Iginla, 101
  Steven Stamkos, 101
12. Guy Lafleur, 98
  Bobby Hull, 98
14. Mats Sundin, 96
15. Steve Yzerman, 94
16. Sergei Fedorov, 93
  Joe Nieuwendyk, 93
18. Mark Messier, 92
  Mike Modano, 92
  Jeremy Roenick, 92
  Johnny Bucyk, 92
  Jeff Carter, 92
23. Wayne Gretzky, 91
  Mark Recchi, 91
25. Mike Gartner, 90

==== Regular season: Overtime goals ====
If a game is tied after regulation time (which lasts three 20-minute periods), there will be a period of "overtime" to decide the winner. The player who scores during these extra five minutes is given the overtime goal. All overtime in the NHL is sudden death—meaning the first team to score is the winner—so the player who scores in overtime also has the game-winning goal.

1. Alexander Ovechkin, 27
2. Sidney Crosby, 25
3. Brad Marchand, 22
4. John Tavares, 20
  Leon Draisaitl, 20
6. Jaromír Jágr, 19
7. Sebastian Aho, 18
  Mark Scheifele, 18
9. Ilya Kovalchuk, 17
  Steven Stamkos, 17
  J.T. Miller, 17
  Connor McDavid, 17
13. Max Pacioretty, 16
  Jonathan Toews, 16
  Brent Burns, 16
  Patrik Eliáš, 16
  Daniel Sedin, 16
  Jeff Carter, 16
  William Nylander, 16
20. Sergei Fedorov, 15
  Marián Hossa, 15
  Mats Sundin, 15
  Johnny Gaudreau, 15
  Nathan MacKinnon, 15
25. Evgeni Malkin, 14
  Patrick Kane, 14
  Kyle Connor, 14
  Auston Matthews, 14
  Jack Eichel, 14
  Kirill Kaprizov, 14
  Alex DeBrincat, 14

==== Regular season: Empty net goals ====
1. Alexander Ovechkin, 72
2. Wayne Gretzky, 56
3. Brad Marchand, 41
4. Marián Hossa, 40
5. Sidney Crosby, 39
6. Mario Lemieux, 33
  Eric Staal, 33
8. Jarome Iginla, 32
  Sebastian Aho, 32
  Nikita Kucherov, 32
11. Blake Wheeler, 31
  Mikko Rantanen, 31
  John Tavares, 31
  Brandon Hagel, 31
15. Zach Parise, 30
  Jake Guentzel, 30
  Kyle Connor, 30
18. Joe Thornton, 29
  Steven Stamkos, 29
  Nathan MacKinnon, 29
21. Pavel Bure, 28
  Bryan Trottier, 28
  Patrice Bergeron, 28
  Patrick Kane, 28
  Connor McDavid, 28
  Artemi Panarin, 28

==== Regular season: Assists ====
Active NHL player
Inducted into the Hockey Hall of Fame
Not yet eligible for Hockey Hall of Fame consideration

Rank	Name	Team(s)	GP	Assists	APG
1	Wayne Gretzky	EDM, LAK, STL, NYR	1,487	1,963	1.320
2	Ron Francis	HFD/CAR, PIT, TOR	1,731	1,249	0.722
3	Mark Messier	EDM, NYR, VAN	1,756	1,193	0.679
4	Ray Bourque	BOS, COL	1,612	1,169	0.725
5	Jaromír Jágr	PIT, WSH, NYR, PHI, DAL, BOS, NJD, FLA, CGY	1,733	1,155	0.666
6	Paul Coffey	EDM, PIT, LAK, DET, HFD/CAR, PHI, CHI, BOS	1,409	1,135	0.806
7	Joe Thornton	BOS, SJS, TOR, FLA	1,714	1,109	0.647
8	Sidney Crosby	PIT	1,420	1,109	0.781
9	Adam Oates	DET, STL, BOS, WSH, PHI, ANA, EDM	1,337	1,079	0.807
10	Steve Yzerman	DET	1,514	1,063	0.702
11	Gordie Howe	DET, HFD	1,767	1,049	0.594
12	Marcel Dionne	DET, LAK, NYR	1,348	1,040	0.772
13	Mario Lemieux	PIT	915	1,033	1.129
14	Joe Sakic	QUE/COL	1,378	1,016	0.737
15	Doug Gilmour	STL, CGY, TOR, NJD, CHI, BUF, MTL	1,474	964	0.654
16	Mark Recchi	PIT, PHI, MTL, CAR, ATL, TBL, BOS	1,652	956	0.579
17	Al MacInnis	CGY, STL	1,416	934	0.660
18	Larry Murphy	LAK, WSH, MNS, PIT, TOR, DET	1,615	929	0.575
19	Stan Mikita	CHI	1,396	926	0.663
20	Bryan Trottier	NYI, PIT	1,279	901	0.704
21	Phil Housley	BUF, WIN, STL, CGY, NJD, WSH, CHI, TOR	1,495	894	0.598
22	Patrick Kane	CHI, NYR, DET	1,369	892	0.652
23	Dale Hawerchuk	WIN, BUF, STL, PHI	1,188	891	0.750
24	Nicklas Lidström	DET	1,564	878	0.561
25	Evgeni Malkin	PIT	1,269	874	0.689

==== Regular season: Assists per game ====
Minimum: 300 assists

1. Wayne Gretzky, 1.320
2. Mario Lemieux, 1.129
3. Connor McDavid, 1.021
4. Bobby Orr, 0.982
5. Peter Forsberg, 0.898
6. Quinn Hughes, 0.826
7. Nikita Kucherov, 0.823
8. Peter Šťastný, 0.808
9. Adam Oates, 0.807
10. Paul Coffey, 0.806
11. Cale Makar, 0.789
12. Mitch Marner, 0.7805
13. Sidney Crosby, 0.7795
14. Marcel Dionne, 0.772
15. Kent Nilsson, 0.763
16. Bernie Federko, 0.761
17. Nathan MacKinnon, 0.760
18. Artemi Panarin, 0.752
19. Dale Hawerchuk, 0.750
20. Bobby Clarke, 0.745
21. Craig Janney, 0.741
22. Joe Sakic, 0.737
23. Mike Bossy, 0.735
24. Ray Bourque, 0.725
25. Leon Draisaitl, 0.724

==== Regular season: Games played (skaters) ====
1. Patrick Marleau, 1,779
2. Gordie Howe, 1,767
3. Mark Messier, 1,756
4. Jaromír Jágr, 1,733
5. Ron Francis, 1,731
6. Joe Thornton, 1,714
7. Zdeno Chára, 1,680
8. Mark Recchi, 1,652
9. Chris Chelios, 1,651
10. Dave Andreychuk, 1,639
11. Scott Stevens, 1,635
12. Larry Murphy, 1,615
13. Ray Bourque, 1,612
14. Brent Burns, 1,579
15. Alexander Ovechkin, 1573
16. Nicklas Lidström, 1,564
17. Jarome Iginla, 1,554
18. Alex Delvecchio, 1,549
19. Johnny Bucyk, 1,540
  Shane Doan, 1,540
21. Ryan Suter, 1,526
22. Brendan Shanahan, 1,524
23. Anže Kopitar, 1,521
24. Matt Cullen, 1,516
25. Steve Yzerman, 1,514

==== Regular season: Penalty minutes ====
1. Tiger Williams, 3,971
2. Dale Hunter, 3,565
3. Tie Domi, 3,515
4. Marty McSorley, 3,381
5. Bob Probert, 3,300
6. Robert Ray, 3,207
7. Craig Berube, 3,149
8. Tim Hunter, 3,146
9. Chris Nilan, 3,043
10. Rick Tocchet, 2,972
11. Pat Verbeek, 2,905
12. Chris Chelios, 2,891
13. Dave Manson, 2,792
14. Scott Stevens, 2,785
15. Donald Brashear, 2,634
16. Willi Plett, 2,572
17. Gino Odjick, 2,567
18. Matthew Barnaby, 2,562
19. Gary Roberts, 2,560
20. Joe Kocur, 2,519
21. Kenneth Daneyko, 2,516
22. Brendan Shanahan, 2,489
23. Scott Mellanby, 2,479
24. Chris Neil, 2,459
25. Basil McRae, 2,457

==== Regular season: Plus-minus ====
1. Larry Robinson, +722
2. Bobby Orr, +582
3. Ray Bourque, +527
4. Wayne Gretzky, +520
5. Bobby Clarke, +507
6. Serge Savard, +462
7. Denis Potvin, +456
8. Nicklas Lidström, +450
9. Bryan Trottier, +449
10. Guy Lafleur, +446
11. Brad McCrimmon, +444
12. Mark Howe, +400
13. Scott Stevens, +395
14. Steve Shutt, +394
15. Mike Bossy, +380
16. Al MacInnis, +371
17. Brad Park, +363
18. Chris Chelios, +351
19. Jacques Lemaire, +344
20. Guy Lapointe, +329
  Stan Mikita, +329
22. Craig Ramsay, +324
23. Jaromír Jágr, +322
24. Bill Hajt, +321
25. Dallas Smith, +318

==== Regular season: Shots on goal ====
1. Alexander Ovechkin, 7,108
2. Ray Bourque, 6,209
3. Jaromír Jágr, 5,637
4. Marcel Dionne, 5,363
5. Phil Esposito, 5,166
6. Al MacInnis, 5,157
7. Mike Gartner, 5,090
8. Wayne Gretzky, 5,088
9. Brendan Shanahan, 5,086
10. Brett Hull, 4,876
11. Jarome Iginla, 4,759
12. Joe Sakic, 4,621
13. Steve Yzerman, 4,602
14. Bobby Hull, 4,577
15. Dave Andreychuk, 4,556
16. Teemu Selänne, 4,540
17. Stan Mikita, 4,482
18. Sidney Crosby, 4,459
19. Patrick Kane, 4,402
20. Paul Coffey, 4,389
21. Patrick Marleau, 4,333
22. Mike Modano, 4,273
23. Marián Hossa, 4,229
24. Brent Burns, 4,223
25. Mark Messier, 4,221

==== Regular season: Shooting percentage ====
Shooting percentage is the percentage of shots on goal which result in a goal.

Minimum 800 shots

1. Craig Simpson, 23.66%
2. Charlie Simmer, 22.34%
3. Paul MacLean, 21.41%
4. Mike Bossy, 21.18%
5. Yvon Lambert, 19.85%
6. Rick Middleton, 19.69%
7. Blaine Stoughton, 19.52%
8. Darryl Sutter, 19.42%
9. Rob Brown, 19.41%
10. Mike Ridley, 19.30%
11. Steve Vickers, 19.28%
12. Kent Nilsson, 19.21%
13. Tom McCarthy, 19.16%
14. Jari Kurri, 19.13%
15. Mario Lemieux, 18.99%
16. Peter Šťastný, 18.96%
17. Ray Ferraro, 18.85%
18. Mark Hunter, 18.80%
19. Tim Kerr, 18.64%
20. Leon Draisaitl, 18.60%

==== Playoff: Points ====
1. Wayne Gretzky, 382
2. Mark Messier, 295
3. Jari Kurri, 233
4. Glenn Anderson, 214
5. Sidney Crosby, 206
6. Jaromír Jágr, 201
7. Paul Coffey, 196
8. Brett Hull, 190
9. Doug Gilmour, 188
  Joe Sakic, 188
11. Steve Yzerman, 185
12. Nicklas Lidström, 183
  Evgeni Malkin, 183
14. Bryan Trottier, 182
15. Ray Bourque, 180
16. Nikita Kucherov, 177
17. Jean Béliveau, 176
  Sergei Fedorov, 176
19. Denis Savard, 175
20. Mario Lemieux, 172
21. Peter Forsberg, 171
22. Denis Potvin, 165
23. Mike Bossy, 160
  Gordie Howe, 160
  Al MacInnis, 160
  Bobby Smith, 160

==== Playoff: Points per game ====
Minimum: 50 points

1. Wayne Gretzky, 1.837
2. Mario Lemieux, 1.608
3. Barry Pederson, 1.529
  Connor McDavid, 1.529
5. Leon Draisaitl, 1.480
6. Nathan MacKinnon, 1.296
7. Mark Messier, 1.250
8. Bobby Orr, 1.243
9. Mike Bossy, 1.240
10. Mikko Rantanen, 1.238
11. Jari Kurri, 1.165
12. Gilbert Perreault, 1.144
13. Peter Forsberg, 1.133
14. Peter Šťastný, 1.129
15. Nikita Kucherov, 1.113
16. Bernie Federko, 1.110
17. Sidney Crosby, 1.108
18. Pavel Bure, 1.094
19. Joe Sakic, 1.093
20. Jean Béliveau, 1.086
  Evan Bouchard, 1.086
22. Bobby Hull, 1.084
23. Eric Lindros, 1.076
24. Toe Blake, 1.069
25. Ken Linseman, 1.062

==== Playoff: Goals ====
1. Wayne Gretzky, 122
2. Mark Messier, 109
3. Jari Kurri, 106
4. Brett Hull, 103
5. Glenn Anderson, 93
6. Mike Bossy, 85
7. Joe Sakic, 84
8. Maurice Richard, 82
9. Claude Lemieux, 80
10. Jean Béliveau, 79
11. Jaromír Jágr, 78
12. Alexander Ovechkin, 77
13. Mario Lemieux, 76
14. Joe Pavelski, 74
15. Dino Ciccarelli, 73
16. Esa Tikkanen, 72
  Patrick Marleau, 72
  Sidney Crosby, 72
19. Bryan Trottier, 71
20. Steve Yzerman, 70
21. Evgeni Malkin, 69
22. Gordie Howe, 68
23. Joe Nieuwendyk, 66
  Denis Savard, 66
  Brad Marchand, 66

===== Playoff: Goals per game =====
Minimum 20 goals

1. Mario Lemieux, 0.710
2. Mike Bossy, 0.659
3. Barry Pederson, 0.647
4. Maurice Richard, 0.621
5. Cam Neely, 0.613
6. Wayne Gretzky, 0.587
7. Nathan MacKinnon, 0.574
8. Pavel Bure, 0.547
9. Leon Draisaitl, 0.539
10. Craig Simpson, 0.537
11. Jake Guentzel, 0.531
12. Jari Kurri, 0.530
13. Bobby Hull, 0.521
14. Gordie Drillon, 0.520
15. Dino Ciccarelli, 0.518
16. Brett Hull, 0.510
17. Steve Shutt, 0.505
18. Reggie Leach, 0.500
19. Rick Vaive, 0.500
20. Tim Kerr, 0.494
21. Steve Payne, 0.493
22. Mark Scheifele, 0.491
23. Joe Sakic, 0.488
24. Jean Béliveau, 0.488
25. Alexander Ovechkin, 0.478

===== Playoff: Power Play goals =====
1. Brett Hull, 38
2. Mike Bossy, 35
  Wayne Gretzky, 35
4. Dino Ciccarelli, 34
5. Alexander Ovechkin, 31
6. Nicklas Lidström, 30
  Joe Pavelski, 30
8. Mario Lemieux, 29
  Evgeni Malkin, 29
10. Denis Potvin, 28
11. Brian Propp, 27
  Joe Sakic, 27
  Steve Yzerman, 27
14. Al MacInnis, 26
  Jean Beliveau, 26
16. Cam Neely, 25
  Daniel Alfredsson, 25
  Jari Kurri, 25
19. Jaromír Jágr, 24
  Mike Modano, 24
  Denis Savard, 24
  Bobby Smith, 24
  Patrick Marleau, 24
  Bobby Hull, 24
  Mark Messier, 24
  Corey Perry, 24

===== Playoff: Short-handed goals =====
1. Mark Messier, 14
2. Wayne Gretzky, 12
3. Jari Kurri, 10
4. Håkan Loob, 8
  Ed Westfall, 8
6. Mario Lemieux, 7
7. Dave Poulin, 6
  Wayne Presley, 6
  Brian Rolston, 6
  Derek Sanderson, 6
  Dave Keon, 6
  Guy Carbonneau, 6
  Paul Coffey, 6
14. Bill Barber, 5
  Bob Bourne, 5
  Sergei Fedorov, 5
  Lorne Henning, 5
  Anders Kallur, 5
  Kirk Maltby, 5
  Kelly Miller, 5

===== Playoff: Game-winning goals =====
1. Wayne Gretzky, 24
  Brett Hull, 24
3. Claude Lemieux, 19
  Joe Sakic, 19
5. Maurice Richard, 18
  Joe Pavelski, 18
7. Glenn Anderson, 17
  Mike Bossy, 17
  Chris Drury, 17
10. Jaromír Jágr, 16
  Patrick Marleau, 16
  Brad Marchand, 16
13. Mike Modano, 15
  Yvan Cournoyer, 15
  Jean Béliveau, 15
16. Peter Forsberg, 14
  Jari Kurri, 14
  Guy Lafleur, 14
  Joe Nieuwendyk, 14
  Mark Messier, 14
  Bernie Geoffrion, 14
22. Daniel Brière, 13
  Dino Ciccarelli, 13
  Doug Gilmour, 13
  Stéphane Richer, 13
  Bobby Smith, 13
  Evgeni Malkin, 13
  Ondrej Palat, 13
  Carter Verhaeghe, 13

===== Playoff: Overtime goals =====
If a game is tied after regulation time (which lasts three 20-minutes periods), there will be as many 20-minute periods of "overtime" as necessary during the playoffs to determine a winner. The player who scores during this extra time is given the overtime goal. All overtime in the NHL is sudden death—meaning the first team to score is the winner—so the player who scores in overtime also has the game-winning goal.

1. Joe Sakic, 8
2. Maurice Richard, 6
3. Glenn Anderson, 5
  Patrick Kane, 5
  Corey Perry, 5
  Carter Verhaeghe, 5
  Brad Marchand, 5
8. Martin St. Louis, 4
  Joe Murphy, 4
  Kirk Muller, 4
  Stéphane Richer, 4
  Chris Drury, 4
  Jamie Langenbrunner, 4
  Jeremy Roenick, 4
  Bob Nystrom, 4
  Patrice Bergeron, 4
  Dale Hunter, 4
  Esa Tikkanen, 4
  Patrick Marleau, 4
  Wayne Gretzky, 4
  Jaromír Jágr, 4
  Joe Pavelski, 4
  Nicklas Bäckström, 4
  Leon Draisaitl, 4

==== Playoff: Assists ====
1. Wayne Gretzky, 260
2. Mark Messier, 186
3. Ray Bourque, 139
4. Paul Coffey, 137
5. Sidney Crosby, 134
6. Nicklas Lidström, 129
7. Doug Gilmour, 128
8. Jari Kurri, 127
9. Sergei Fedorov, 124
10. Jaromír Jágr, 123
  Nikita Kucherov, 123
12. Glenn Anderson, 121
  Al MacInnis, 121
14. Larry Robinson, 116
15. Larry Murphy, 115
  Steve Yzerman, 115
17. Adam Oates, 114
  Evgeni Malkin, 114
19. Chris Chelios, 113
20. Bryan Trottier, 111
  Connor McDavid, 111
22. Denis Savard, 109
  Denis Potvin, 109
24. Peter Forsberg, 107
25. Joe Sakic, 104

==== Playoff: Assists per game ====
Minimum 30 assists

1. Wayne Gretzky, 1.250
2. Connor McDavid, 1.088
3. Leon Draisaitl, 0.941
4. Mario Lemieux, 0.897
5. Bobby Orr, 0.892
6. Barry Pederson, 0.882
7. Jack Eichel, 0.855
8. Quinn Hughes, 0.854
9. Evan Bouchard, 0.827
10. Mikko Rantanen, 0.819
11. Mark Messier, 0.788
12. Gilbert Perreault, 0.778
13. Peter Šťastný, 0.774
14. Nikita Kucherov, 0.774
15. Mitch Marner, 0.750
16. Adam Fox, 0.739
17. Brian Leetch, 0.726
18. Bernie Federko, 0.725
19. Nathan MacKinnon, 0.722
20. Sidney Crosby, 0.720
21. Craig Janney, 0.717
22. Dale Hawerchuk, 0.711
23. Cale Makar, 0.711
24. Peter Forsberg, 0.709
25. Paul Coffey, 0.706

==== Playoff: Games played (skaters) ====
1. Chris Chelios, 266
2. Nicklas Lidström, 263
3. Corey Perry, 244
4. Mark Messier, 236
5. Claude Lemieux, 234
6. Scott Stevens, 233
7. Guy Carbonneau, 231
8. Larry Robinson, 227
9. Glenn Anderson, 225
10. Kris Draper, 222
11. Bryan Trottier, 221
12. Mike Keane, 220
13. Larry Murphy, 215
14. Ray Bourque, 214
  Kevin Lowe, 214
16. Wayne Gretzky, 208
  Jaromír Jágr, 208
18. Marián Hossa, 205
19. Ryan McDonagh, 203
20. Brett Hull, 202
  Scott Niedermayer, 202
22. Joe Pavelski, 201
23. Jari Kurri, 200
  Zdeno Chára, 200
25. Steve Yzerman, 196

==== Playoff: Penalty minutes ====
1. Dale Hunter, 731
2. Chris Nilan, 541
3. Claude Lemieux, 529
4. Rick Tocchet, 471
5. Willi Plett, 466
6. Tiger Williams, 455
7. Glenn Anderson, 442
8. Tim Hunter, 426
9. Chris Chelios, 423
10. Dave Schultz, 412
11. Duane Sutter, 405
12. Scott Stevens, 402
13. Jim Peplinski, 382
  Al Secord, 382
15. Marty McSorley, 374
16. André Dupont, 352
17. Basil McRae, 349
18. Dave Manson, 343
19. Terry O'Reilly, 335
20. Gary Roberts, 332

==== Playoff: Plus-minus ====
1. Jari Kurri, +101
2. Larry Robinson, +100
3. Charlie Huddy, +98
4. Wayne Gretzky, +91
5. Randy Gregg, +81
6. Denis Potvin, +64
7. Glenn Anderson, +63
8. Nicklas Lidström, +61
9. Bobby Orr, +60
10. William Karlsson, +55
11. Jacques Lemaire, +54
  Peter Forsberg, +54
13. Paul Coffey, +53
14. Mark Messier, +52
15. Guy Lafleur, +50
16. Zdeno Chára, +49
  Steve Smith, +49
  Ken Linseman, +49
19. Kevin Lowe, +48
  Jimmy Watson, +48
  Chris Chelios, +48
  Jacob Slavin, +48
23. Serge Savard, +47
  Brad Marchand, +47
25. Steve Shutt, +46

==== Playoff: Shots on goal ====
1. Ray Bourque, 814
2. Brett Hull, 803
3. Claude Lemieux, 730
4. Marián Hossa, 712
5. Wayne Gretzky, 699
6. Jaromír Jágr, 682
7. Alexander Ovechkin, 675
8. Mark Messier, 671
9. Al MacInnis, 663
10. Nicklas Lidström, 656
11. Brendan Shanahan, 622
12. Paul Coffey, 616
  Evgeni Malkin, 616
14. Sergei Fedorov, 603
15. Chris Chelios, 587
16. Steve Yzerman, 584
17. Joe Sakic, 582
18. Denis Potvin, 578
19. Patrice Bergeron, 561
  Sidney Crosby, 561
21. Glenn Anderson, 554
22. Joe Pavelski, 548
23. Corey Perry, 541
24. Phil Esposito, 535
25. Bobby Hull, 531

===== Playoff: Shooting percentage =====
Shooting percentage is the percentage of shots on goal which result in a goal.

Minimum 80 shots

1. Craig Simpson, 33.64%
2. Brett Howden, 24.21%
3. Mark Scheifele, 22.22%
4. Peter Šťastný, 21.71%
5. Darryl Sutter, 21.62%
6. Andrew Brunette, 21.25%
7. Thomas Gradin, 21.25%
8. Barry Pederson, 21.15%
9. Rick Middleton, 20.74%
10. Jari Kurri, 20.11%
11. Steve Vickers, 20.00%
12. Tim Kerr, 19.70%
13. Cam Neely, 19.59%
14. Mike Bossy, 19.50%
15. Paul MacLean, 19.44%
16. Ray Ferraro, 19.27%
17. Bernie Federko, 19.13%
18. Jussi Jokinen, 19.10%
19. Tom Fergus, 19.09%
20. Leon Draisaitl, 18.97%
21. Mario Lemieux, 18.91%
22. Kevin Dineen, 18.85%
23. Brayden Point, 18.83%
24. Kirill Kaprizov, 18.81%
25. Chris Kreider, 18.66%

=== Active leaders (skaters) ===
==== Regular season: Points (active) ====
1. Sidney Crosby, 1,761
2. Alexander Ovechkin, 1,687
3. Evgeni Malkin, 1,407
4. Patrick Kane, 1,400
5. Steven Stamkos, 1,256
6. Connor McDavid, 1,220
7. John Tavares, 1,185
8. Claude Giroux, 1,165
9. Nathan MacKinnon, 1,142
10. Nikita Kucherov, 1,124
11. Leon Draisaitl, 1,053
12. Brad Marchand, 1,034
13. Jamie Benn, 992
14. Corey Perry, 972
15. Artemi Panarin, 954
16. Brent Burns, 945
17. Matt Duchene, 936
18. David Pastrňák, 933
19. Jonathan Toews, 912
20. Mark Scheifele, 907

===== Regular season: Points per game (active) =====
Minimum 500 points

1. Connor McDavid, 1.537
2. Nikita Kucherov, 1.279
3. Sidney Crosby, 1.240
4. Leon Draisaitl, 1.232
5. Nathan MacKinnon, 1.202
6. Artemi Panarin, 1.149
7. Auston Matthews, 1.132
8. David Pastrňák, 1.120
9. Mitch Marner, 1.112
10. Evgeni Malkin, 1.109
11. Mikko Rantanen, 1.092
12. Cale Makar, 1.079
13. Alexander Ovechkin, 1.072
14. Patrick Kane, 1.023
15. Jack Eichel, 1.012
16. Steven Stamkos, 1.008
17. Matthew Tkachuk, 0.996
18. Aleksander Barkov, 0.973
19. Kyle Connor, 0.970
20. Jake Guentzel, 0.968

==== Regular season: Goals (active) ====
1. Alexander Ovechkin, 929
2. Sidney Crosby, 664
3. Steven Stamkos, 624
4. Evgeni Malkin, 533
5. John Tavares, 525
6. Patrick Kane, 508
7. Corey Perry, 465
8. Brad Marchand, 451
9. Leon Draisaitl, 434
10. Auston Matthews, 428
11. Nathan MacKinnon, 420
  David Pastrnak, 420
13. Jamie Benn, 414
14. Connor McDavid, 409
15. Nikita Kucherov, 401
16. Matt Duchene, 387
17. Jonathan Toews, 383
18. Claude Giroux, 379
19. Mark Scheifele, 372
20. Tyler Seguin, 367

===== Regular season: Goals per game (active) =====
Minimum 200 goals

1. Auston Matthews, 0.621
2. Alexander Ovechkin, 0.591
3. Kirill Kaprizov, 0.579
4. Connor McDavid, 0.515
5. Leon Draisaitl, 0.508
6. David Pastrňák, 0.504
7. Steven Stamkos, 0.501
8. Jason Robertson, 0.467
9. Kyle Connor, 0.465
10. Sidney Crosby, 0.461
11. Nikita Kucherov, 0.456
12. Brayden Point, 0.450
13. Jake Guentzel, 0.449
14. Nathan MacKinnon, 0.442
15. Mikko Rantanen, 0.441
16. Alex DeBrincat, 0.422
17. Evgeni Malkin, 0.420
18. Patrik Laine, 0.417
19. Filip Forsberg, 0.4153
20. John Tavares, 0.4147

===== Regular season: Power Play goals (active) =====
When a team is given a penalty for committing an infraction (such as tripping another player), the offending player must sit in the penalty box, and his team must play with one fewer player on the ice. The penalized team is said to be "short-handed", while the other team has a "powerplay". If a player scores while his team is on the powerplay, this is recorded as a powerplay goal.

1. Alexander Ovechkin, 331
2. Steven Stamkos, 242
3. Sidney Crosby, 194
4. Evgeni Malkin, 187
5. Leon Draisaitl, 178
6. John Tavares, 167
7. Patrick Kane, 140
8. Mika Zibanejad, 136
9. David Pastrňák, 132
10. Corey Perry, 129

===== Regular season: Short-handed goals (active) =====
When a team is given a penalty for committing an infraction (such as tripping another player), the offending player must sit in the penalty box, and his team must play with one fewer player on the ice. The penalized team is said to be "short-handed", while the other team has a "powerplay". If a player scores while his team is short handed, this is recorded as a short-handed goal.

1. Brad Marchand, 36
2. Jean-Gabriel Pageau, 24
3. Blake Coleman, 22
4. Jordan Staal, 21
  Joel Armia, 21
6. Mikael Backlund, 19
  Anthony Cirelli, 19
8. Evander Kane, 18
9. Adam Henrique, 17
  Jonathan Toews, 17

===== Regular season: Game-winning goals (active) =====
1. Alexander Ovechkin, 141
2. Sidney Crosby, 104
3. Steven Stamkos, 101
4. Evgeni Malkin, 89
5. John Tavares, 86
6. Brad Marchand, 85
  Patrick Kane, 85
8. Corey Perry, 80
9. Nathan MacKinnon, 76
  Connor McDavid, 76

===== Regular season: Overtime goals (active) =====
If a game is tied after regulation time (which lasts three 20-minutes periods), there will be a period of "overtime" to decide the winner. The player who scores during this extra time is given the overtime goal. All overtime in the NHL is sudden death—meaning the first team to score is the winner—so the player who scores in overtime also has the game-winning goal.

1. Alexander Ovechkin, 27
2. Sidney Crosby, 25
3. Brad Marchand, 22
4. John Tavares, 20
  Leon Draisaitl, 20
6. Mark Scheifele, 18
  Sebastian Aho, 18
8. Steven Stamkos, 17
  J.T. Miller, 17
  Connor McDavid, 17

==== Regular season: Empty net goals (active) ====
1. Alexander Ovechkin, 72
2. Brad Marchand, 41
3. Sidney Crosby, 39
4. Nikita Kucherov, 32
  Sebastian Aho, 32
6. John Tavares, 31
  Mikko Rantanen, 31
  Brandon Hagel, 31
9. Jake Guentzel, 30
  Kyle Connor, 30

==== Regular season: Assists (active) ====
1. Sidney Crosby, 1,107
2. Patrick Kane, 892
3. Evgeni Malkin, 874
4. Connor McDavid, 811
5. Claude Giroux, 786
6. Alexander Ovechkin, 758
7. Nikita Kucherov, 723
8. Nathan MacKinnon, 722
9. Erik Karlsson, 721
10. Brent Burns, 672

===== Regular season: Assists per game (active) =====
Minimum 300 assists

1. Connor McDavid, 1.021
2. Quinn Hughes, 0.826
3. Nikita Kucherov, 0.823
4. Cale Makar, 0.789
5. Mitch Marner, 0.7805
6. Sidney Crosby, 0.7796
7. Nathan MacKinnon, 0.760
8. Artemi Panarin, 0.752
9. Leon Draisaitl, 0.724
10. Adam Fox, 0.720

==== Regular season: Games played (skaters, active) ====
1. Brent Burns, 1,579
2. Alexander Ovechkin, 1,573
3. Corey Perry, 1,464
4. Sidney Crosby, 1,420
5. Jordan Staal, 1,403
6. Patrick Kane, 1,369
7. Claude Giroux, 1,345
8. Nick Foligno, 1,287
9. Drew Doughty, 1,279
10. Evgeni Malkin, 1,269

==== Regular season: Penalty minutes (active) ====
A penalty is given to a player for committing an infraction during the game. The length of the penalty varies depending on the severity of the offence. The amount of penalty minutes recorded for statistical purposes are:

- minor – 2 minutes
- double minor – 4 minutes
- major – 5 minutes
- misconduct – 10 minutes
- game misconduct – 10 minutes
1. Tom Wilson, 1,649
2. Corey Perry, 1,568
3. Evander Kane, 1,278
4. Evgeni Malkin, 1,263
5. Brad Marchand, 1,153
6. Ryan Reaves, 1,137
7. Radko Gudas, 1,124
8. Nick Foligno, 1,024
9. Brenden Dillon, 1,014
10. Nikita Zadorov, 998

==== Regular season: Plus-minus (active) ====
Plus-minus is a statistic that indicates the relative goal differential when a player is on the ice. If the player is on the ice when his team scores even-strength or short-handed, he is given +1; if he is on the ice when the opposing team scores even-strength or they score a goal while he is on the powerplay, he is given -1.

1. Ryan McDonagh, +303
2. Brad Marchand, +269
3. Nathan MacKinnon, +229
4. Devon Toews, +223
5. Mattias Ekholm, +219
6. Nikita Kucherov +200
7. Sidney Crosby, +197
8. Victor Hedman, +192
9. Connor McDavid, +186
10. Jaccob Slavin, +175

==== Regular season: Shots on goal (active) ====
1. Alexander Ovechkin, 7,108
2. Sidney Crosby, 4,459
3. Patrick Kane, 4,402
4. Brent Burns, 4,223
5. Evgeni Malkin, 3,958
6. John Tavares, 3,941
7. Nathan MacKinnon, 3,842
8. Steven Stamkos, 3,712
9. Corey Perry, 3,573
10. Evander Kane, 3,419

===== Regular season: Shooting percentage (active) =====
Shooting percentage is the percentage of shots on goal which result in a goal.

Minimum 800 shots

1. Leon Draisaitl, 18.6%
2. Brayden Point, 18.4%
3. Ivan Barbashev, 17.6%
4. Mark Scheifele, 17.5%
5. Steven Stamkos, 16.8%
6. Kirill Kaprizov, 16.5%
7. Roope Hintz, 16.2%
8. Sam Reinhart, 16.05%
9. Mikko Rantanen, 15.968%
10. Robert Thomas, 15.961%

==== Playoff: Points (active) ====
1. Sidney Crosby, 206
2. Evgeni Malkin, 183
3. Nikita Kucherov, 177
4. Brad Marchand, 158
5. Connor McDavid, 156
6. Leon Draisaitl, 151
7. Alexander Ovechkin, 147
8. Corey Perry, 141
9. Nathan MacKinnon, 140
10. Patrick Kane, 138
11. Mikko Rantanen, 130
12. Victor Hedman, 120
13. Ondřej Palát, 103
14. Steven Stamkos, 101
  Logan Couture, 101
16. Mark Stone, 97
  Sebastian Aho, 97
18. David Pastrnak, 94
19. Kris Letang, 92
  Mitch Marner, 92

===== Playoff: Points per game (active) =====
Minimum 50 points

1. Connor McDavid, 1.53
2. Leon Draisaitl, 1.48
3. Nathan MacKinnon, 1.30
4. Mikko Rantanen, 1.24
5. Nikita Kucherov, 1.113
6. Sidney Crosby, 1.108
7. Evan Bouchard, 1.09
8. Jack Eichel, 1.05
9. Evgeni Malkin, 1.00
  Jake Guentzel, 1.00
  Mitch Marner, 1.00
  Cale Makar, 1.00
13. David Pastrnak, 0.98
14. Patrick Kane, 0.97
15. Gabriel Landeskog, 0.94
16. Alexander Ovechkin, 0.913
17. Brayden Point, 0.909
18. Sebastian Aho, 0.90
19. Matthew Tkachuk, 0.89
20. Brad Marchand, 0.88

==== Playoff: Goals (active) ====
1. Alexander Ovechkin, 77
2. Sidney Crosby, 72
3. Evgeni Malkin, 69
4. Brad Marchand, 66
5. Corey Perry, 64
6. Nathan MacKinnon, 62
7. Leon Draisaitl, 55
8. Nikita Kucherov, 54
9. Patrick Kane, 53
10. Ondřej Palát, 51
11. Steven Stamkos, 50
  Chris Kreider, 50
13. Logan Couture, 48
  Mark Stone, 48
15. Jordan Staal, 46
16. Brayden Point, 45
  Connor McDavid, 45
18. Mikko Rantanen, 44
19. Jake Guentzel, 43
20. Zach Hyman, 42
  David Pastrňák, 42

===== Playoff: Goals per game (active) =====
Minimum 20 goals

1. Nathan MacKinnon, 0.574
2. Leon Draisaitl, 0.539
3. Jake Guentzel, 0.531
4. Mark Scheifele, 0.491
5. Alexander Ovechkin, 0.478
6. Brayden Point, 0.455
7. Connor McDavid, 0.441
8. David Pastrňák, 0.438
9. Sam Reinhart, 0.421
10. Mikko Rantanen, 0.419
11. Logan Couture, 0.414
12. Zach Hyman, 0.396
13. Gabriel Landeskog, 0.391
14. Steven Stamkos, 0.391
15. William Nylander, 0.388
16. Sidney Crosby, 0.387
17. Vladimir Tarasenko, 0.386
18. Filip Forsberg, 0.383
19. Auston Matthews, 0.382
20. Evgeni Malkin, 0.377

===== Playoff: Power Play goals (active) =====
When a team is given a penalty for committing an infraction (such as tripping another player), the offending player must sit in the penalty box, and his team must play with one fewer player on the ice. The penalized team is said to be "short-handed," while the other team has a "powerplay." If a player scores while his team is on the powerplay, this is recorded as a powerplay goal.

1. Alexander Ovechkin, 31
2. Evgeni Malkin, 29
3. Corey Perry, 24
4. Leon Draisaitl, 23
5. Sidney Crosby, 21
6. Steven Stamkos, 20
  Nathan MacKinnon, 20
8. Chris Kreider, 19
  Nikita Kucherov, 19
10. Brad Marchand, 18

===== Playoff: Short-handed goals (active) =====
When a team is given a penalty for committing an infraction (such as tripping another player), the offending player must sit in the penalty box, and his team must play with one fewer player on the ice. The penalized team is said to be "short-handed", while the other team has a "powerplay". If a player scores while his team is short handed, this is recorded as a short-handed goal.

1. Brad Marchand, 3
  Chris Kreider, 3
  William Karlsson, 3
  Joel Armia, 3
  Brett Howden, 3
6. Claude Giroux, 2
  Jamie Benn, 2
  Jordan Staal, 2
  Mikael Backlund, 2
  Lars Eller, 2
  Mark Stone, 2
  Blake Coleman, 2
  Barclay Goodrow, 2
  Yanni Gourde, 2
  Jordan Martinook, 2
  Mattias Janmark, 2
  J.T. Compher, 2
  Bo Horvat, 2
  Connor McDavid, 2
  Sebastian Aho, 2
  Marcus Foligno, 2
  Sean Kuraly, 2

===== Playoff: Game-winning goals (active) =====
1. Brad Marchand, 16
2. Evgeni Malkin, 13
  Ondrej Palat, 13
  Carter Verhaeghe, 13
5. Corey Perry, 12
  Chris Kreider, 12
7. Alexander Ovechkin, 11
  Patrick Kane, 11
9. Nathan MacKinnon, 10
10. Sidney Crosby, 9
  Sebastian Aho, 9

===== Playoff: Overtime goals (active) =====
If a game is tied after regulation time (which lasts three 20-minutes periods), there will be a period of "overtime" to decide the winner. The player who scores during this extra time is given the overtime goal. All overtime in the NHL is sudden death—meaning the first team to score is the winner—so the player who scores in overtime also has the game-winning goal.

1. Patrick Kane, 5
  Corey Perry, 5
  Brad Marchand, 5
  Carter Verhaeghe, 5
5. Leon Draisaitl, 4
6. Jordan Staal, 3
  John Tavares, 3
  Matt Duchene, 3
  Brayden Point, 3
  Artemi Panarin, 3
  Matthew Tkachuk, 3
  Brett Howden, 3

==== Playoff: Assists (active) ====
1. Sidney Crosby, 134
2. Nikita Kucherov, 123
3. Evgeni Malkin, 114
4. Connor McDavid, 111
5. Victor Hedman, 97
6. Leon Draisaitl, 96
7. Brad Marchand, 92
8. Mikko Rantanen, 86
9. Patrick Kane, 85
10. Nathan MacKinnon, 78
11. Corey Perry, 77
12. Alexander Ovechkin, 70
13. Mitch Marner, 69
14. Shea Theodore, 68
15. Kris Letang, 67
  Evan Bouchard, 67
17. Alex Pietrangelo, 65
18. Cale Makar, 64
19. John Carlson, 63
20. Ryan Nugent-Hopkins, 61

==== Playoff: Assists per game (active) ====
Minimum 30 assists

1. Connor McDavid, 1.088
2. Leon Draisaitl, 0.941
3. Jack Eichel, 0.855
4. Quinn Hughes, 0.854
5. Evan Bouchard, 0.827
6. Mikko Rantanen, 0.819
7. Nikita Kucherov, 0.774
8. Mitch Marner, 0.750
9. Adam Fox, 0.739
10. Nathan MacKinnon, 0.722
11. Sidney Crosby, 0.720
12. Cale Makar, 0.711
13. Erik Karlsson, 0.644
14. Evgeni Malkin, 0.623
15. Ryan Nugent-Hopkins, 0.598
16. Mika Zibanejad, 0.595
17. Patrick Kane, 0.594
18. Victor Hedman, 0.571
19. Matthew Tkachuk, 0.553
20. Gabriel Landeskog, 0.552

==== Playoff: Games played (skaters, active) ====
1. Corey Perry, 244
2. Ryan McDonagh, 203
3. Sidney Crosby, 186
4. Evgeni Malkin, 183
5. Jordan Staal, 181
6. Brad Marchand, 180
7. Victor Hedman, 170
8. Alexander Ovechkin, 161
9. Nikita Kucherov, 159
10. Ondřej Palát, 155
  Kris Letang, 155
12. Alex Killorn, 152
13. Tyler Seguin, 151
14. Alex Pietrangelo, 149
  John Carlson, 149

==== Playoff: Penalty minutes (active) ====
A penalty is given to a player for committing an infraction during the game. The length of the penalty varies depending on the severity of the offence. The amount of penalty minutes recorded for statistical purposes are:

- minor – 2 minutes
- double minor – 4 minutes
- major – 5 minutes
- misconduct – 10 minutes
- game misconduct – 10 minutes
1. Corey Perry, 299
2. Evander Kane, 248
  Evgeni Malkin, 248
4. Brad Marchand, 207
5. Matthew Tkachuk, 190
6. Sam Bennett, 178
7. Tom Wilson, 164
8. Kris Letang, 162
9. Nikita Zadorov, 161
10. Jamie Benn, 153

==== Playoff: Plus-minus (active) ====
Plus-minus is a statistic that indicates the relative goal differential when a player is on the ice. If the player is on the ice when his team scores even-strength or short-handed, he is given +1; if he is on the ice when the opposing team scores even-strength or short-handed, he is given -1.

1. William Karlsson, +55
2. Jaccob Slavin, +48
3. Brad Marchand, +47
4. Nathan MacKinnon, +43
5. Nikita Kucherov, +39
6. Jonathan Marchessault, +37
  Gustav Forsling, +37
8. Reilly Smith, +34
  Ondřej Palát, +34
10. Devon Toews, +33

==== Playoff: Shots on goal (active) ====
1. Alexander Ovechkin, 675
2. Evgeni Malkin, 616
3. Sidney Crosby, 561
4. Corey Perry, 541
5. Nathan MacKinnon, 495
6. Nikita Kucherov, 480
7. Brad Marchand, 456
8. Patrick Kane, 445
9. Brent Burns, 429
10. Victor Hedman, 425
  Tyler Seguin, 425

===== Playoff: Shooting percentage (active) =====
Shooting percentage is the percentage of shots on goal which result in a goal.

Minimum 80 shots

1. Brett Howden, 24.21%
2. Mark Scheifele, 22.22%
3. Leon Draisaitl, 18.97%
4. Brayden Point, 18.83%
5. Kirill Kaprizov, 18.81%
6. Chris Kreider, 18.66%
7. Mark Stone, 18.46%
8. Jake Guentzel, 17.99%
9. Logan Stankoven, 16.52%
10. Ondřej Palát, 16.45%

== Goaltenders ==
The statistics listed include the 2025–26 NHL regular season and 2026 playoffs.

=== All-time leaders (goaltenders) ===
Active goaltenders (during 2025–26 NHL season) are listed in boldface.

==== Regular season: Games played ====
1. Martin Brodeur, 1,266
2. Marc-André Fleury, 1,051
3. Roberto Luongo, 1,044
4. Patrick Roy, 1,029
5. Terry Sawchuk, 971
6. Ed Belfour, 963
7. Curtis Joseph, 943
8. Glenn Hall, 906
9. Henrik Lundqvist, 887
10. Tony Esposito, 886
11. John Vanbiesbrouck, 882
12. Grant Fuhr, 868
13. Gump Worsley, 860
14. Jacques Plante, 837
15. Jonathan Quick, 829
16. Sean Burke, 820
17. **Sergei Bobrovsky**, 806
18. Harry Lumley, 803
19. Nikolai Khabibulin, 799
20. Ryan Miller, 796
21. Rogie Vachon, 795
22. Gilles Meloche, 788
23. Mike Vernon, 782
24. Tom Barrasso, 777
25. Chris Osgood, 744

==== Regular season: Wins ====
1. Martin Brodeur, 691
2. Marc-André Fleury, 575
3. Patrick Roy, 551
4. Roberto Luongo, 489
5. Ed Belfour, 484
6. Henrik Lundqvist, 459
7. **Sergei Bobrovsky**, 456
8. Curtis Joseph, 454
9. Terry Sawchuk, 445
10. Jacques Plante, 437
11. Tony Esposito, 423
12. Jonathan Quick, 410
13. Glenn Hall, 407
14. Grant Fuhr, 403
15. Chris Osgood, 401
16. Ryan Miller, 391
17. Dominik Hašek, 389
18. Mike Vernon, 385
19. John Vanbiesbrouck, 374
20. Andy Moog, 372
21. **Andrei Vasilevskiy**, 370
22. Tom Barrasso, 369
  Pekka Rinne, 369
24. Carey Price, 361
25. Evgeni Nabokov, 353
  Rogie Vachon, 353

==== Regular season: Shutouts ====
A goaltender achieves a shutout when he does not allow a goal against him, and plays the full game. Since 2005-06, if the game ends in a shootout after a 0-0 scoreless tie, both teams' goaltenders are credited with a shutout, regardless of how many shots are conceded during the shootout.

1. Martin Brodeur, 125
2. Terry Sawchuk, 103
3. George Hainsworth, 94
4. Glenn Hall, 84
5. Jacques Plante, 82
6. Dominik Hašek, 81
  Alex Connell, 81
  Tiny Thompson, 81
9. Roberto Luongo, 77
10. Ed Belfour, 76
  Tony Esposito, 76
  Marc-André Fleury, 76
13. Harry Lumley, 71
  Lorne Chabot, 71
15. Roy Worters, 67
16. Patrick Roy, 66
17. Jonathan Quick, 65
18. Henrik Lundqvist, 64
19. Turk Broda, 61
20. Pekka Rinne, 60
21. Evgeni Nabokov, 59
22. John Ross Roach, 58
23. Clint Benedict, 57
24. Eddie Giacomin, 54
  Bernie Parent, 54

==== Regular season: Goals against average ====
Goals against average is the average number of goals a goaltender allows over a 60-minute period (the regulation length of a game). It is calculated by multiplying the goals against by 60 minutes, then dividing by the total minutes played.

Minimum 250 games played

1. Alec Connell, 1.916
2. George Hainsworth, 1.933
3. Lorne Chabot, 2.022
4. Chuck Gardiner, 2.024
5. Tiny Thompson, 2.070
6. Dave Kerr, 2.135
7. Dominik Hašek, 2.202
8. Ken Dryden, 2.238
9. Martin Brodeur, 2.242
10. Tuukka Rask, 2.277
11. Roy Worters, 2.278
12. Roman Turek, 2.306
13. Clint Benedict, 2.317
14. Ben Bishop, 2.324
15. Gerry McNeil, 2.341
16. Bill Durnan, 2.356
17. Marty Turco, 2.357
18. Jacques Plante, 2.375
19. Manny Legace, 2.410
20. Pekka Rinne, 2.4327
21. Henrik Lundqvist, 2.4328
22. Cory Schneider, 2.4330
23. Evgeni Nabokov, 2.436
24. Corey Crawford, 2.445
25. Cristobal Huet, 2.457

==== Regular season: Saves ====
1. Martin Brodeur, 28,928
2. Roberto Luongo, 28,409
3. Marc-André Fleury, 27,188
4. Patrick Roy, 25,800
5. Tony Esposito, 24,761
6. Glenn Hall, 24,611
7. Curtis Joseph, 24,279
8. Henrik Lundqvist, 23,509
9. Ed Belfour, 22,433
10. John Vanbiesbrouck, 22,203
11. Gump Worsley, 21,766
12. Ryan Miller, 21,665
13. Grant Fuhr, 21,615
14. Gilles Meloche, 21,138
15. **Sergei Bobrovsky**, 21,024
16. Sean Burke, 21,003
17. Jacques Plante, 20,889
18. Jonathan Quick, 20,329
19. Nikolai Khabibulin, 20,258
20. Rogie Vachon, 19,882
21. Craig Anderson, 19,846
22. Tom Barrasso, 19,694
23. Carey Price, 19,304
24. Dominik Hašek, 18,648
25. Tomáš Vokoun, 18,625

==== Regular season: Save percentage ====
Save percentage is the percentage of shots on goal that a goaltender stops. It is calculated by dividing the number of saves by the number of shots on goal.

Minimum 250 games played

1. Dominik Hašek, .92226
2. Ken Dryden, .92150
3. Tuukka Rask, .92103
4. Ben Bishop, .92051
5. Tim Thomas, .91990
6. Roberto Luongo, .91867
7. Henrik Lundqvist, .91796
8. Cory Schneider, .91792
9. Corey Crawford, .91770
10. Tomáš Vokoun, .91690
11. Pekka Rinne, .91688
12. Carey Price, .91666
13. **Andrei Vasilevskiy**, .91660
14. Robin Lehner, .91654
15. **Igor Shesterkin**, .91651
16. **Connor Hellebuyck**, .91576
17. Anton Khudobin, .91561
18. **Semyon Varlamov**, .91560
19. Jaroslav Halák, .91521
20. Bernie Parent, .91499
21. Antti Raanta, .91475
22. Braden Holtby, .91458
23. Jonas Hiller, .91445
24. Niklas Bäckström, .914414
25. **Ilya Sorokin**, .914411

==== Regular season: Minutes ====
1. Martin Brodeur, 74,439
2. Marc-André Fleury, 60,670
3. Patrick Roy, 60,215
4. Roberto Luongo, 59,879
5. Terry Sawchuk, 57,156
6. Ed Belfour, 55,696
7. Curtis Joseph, 54,055
8. Glenn Hall, 53,447
9. Tony Esposito, 52,476
10. Henrik Lundqvist, 51,817
11. John Vanbiesbrouck, 50,455
12. Gump Worsley, 50,156
13. Jacques Plante, 49,514
14. Grant Fuhr, 48,928
15. Jonathan Quick, 48,079
16. Harry Lumley, 48,039
17. **Sergei Bobrovsky**, 46,535
18. Sean Burke, 46,441
19. Rogie Vachon, 46,207
20. Ryan Miller, 46,146
21. Nikolai Khabibulin, 45,607
22. Gilles Meloche, 45,323
23. Mike Vernon, 44,503
24. Tom Barrasso, 44,136
25. Dominik Hašek, 42,837

==== Regular season: Points ====
1. Tom Barrasso, 48
2. Grant Fuhr, 47
  Martin Brodeur, 47
4. Patrick Roy, 45
5. Mike Vernon, 39
6. John Vanbiesbrouck, 35
7. Ed Belfour, 34
8. Ron Hextall, 33
9. Curtis Joseph, 31
10. Dan Bouchard, 28
  Sean Burke, 28
  Kari Lehtonen, 28
13. Henrik Lundqvist, 27
14. Tony Esposito, 25
  Mike Palmateer, 25
16. Andy Moog, 24
  Bill Ranford, 24
  Ken Wregget, 24
  **Andrei Vasilevskiy**, 24
20. Kirk McLean, 23
  Tomáš Vokoun, 23
  Roberto Luongo, 23
  Jonathan Quick, 23
  **Jacob Markström**, 23
25. Gilles Meloche, 22
  Marty Turco, 22
  Marc-André Fleury, 22

==== Playoff: Games played ====
1. Patrick Roy, 247
2. Martin Brodeur, 205
3. Marc-André Fleury, 170
4. Ed Belfour, 161
5. Grant Fuhr, 150
6. Mike Vernon, 138
7. Curtis Joseph, 133
8. Andy Moog, 132
  Billy Smith, 132
10. Henrik Lundqvist, 130
11. Chris Osgood, 129
12. **Andrei Vasilevskiy**, 127
13. Tom Barrasso, 119
  Dominik Hašek, 119
15. **Sergei Bobrovsky**, 117
16. Glenn Hall, 115
17. Jacques Plante, 112
  Ken Dryden, 112
19. Terry Sawchuk, 106
20. Tuukka Rask, 104
21. Turk Broda, 101
  **Frederik Andersen**, 101
23. Tony Esposito, 99
24. Braden Holtby, 97
25. Corey Crawford, 96

==== Playoff: Wins ====
1. Patrick Roy, 151
2. Martin Brodeur, 113
3. Marc-André Fleury, 92
  Grant Fuhr, 92
5. Ed Belfour, 88
  Billy Smith, 88
7. Ken Dryden, 80
8. Mike Vernon, 77
9. Chris Osgood, 74
10. Jacques Plante, 71
11. **Andrei Vasilevskiy**, 70
12. Andy Moog, 68
13. Dominik Hašek, 65
14. Curtis Joseph, 63
15. Tom Barrasso, 61
  Henrik Lundqvist, 61
  **Sergei Bobrovsky**, 61
18. Turk Broda, 60
19. Frederik Andersen, 59
20. Tuukka Rask, 57
21. Terry Sawchuk, 54
22. Gerry Cheevers, 53
23. Corey Crawford, 52
24. Braden Holtby, 50
25. Glenn Hall, 49
  Jonathan Quick, 49

==== Playoff: Shutouts ====
A goaltender achieves a shutout when he does not allow a goal against him, and plays the full game.

1. Martin Brodeur, 24
2. Patrick Roy, 23
3. Curtis Joseph, 16
  Marc-André Fleury, 16
5. Chris Osgood, 15
6. Ed Belfour, 14
  Dominik Hašek, 14
  Jacques Plante, 14
9. Turk Broda, 13
10. Terry Sawchuk, 12
11. Ken Dryden, 10
  Henrik Lundqvist, 10
  Jonathan Quick, 10
14. Mike Richter, 9
  Clint Benedict, 9
16. Gerry Cheevers, 8
  George Hainsworth, 8
  Dave Kerr, 8
  Félix Potvin, 8
  Carey Price, 8
  **Andrei Vasilevskiy**, 8
  **Frederik Andersen**, 8
23. Harry Lumley, 7
  Evgeni Nabokov, 7
  Tiny Thompson, 7
  John Ross Roach, 7
  Braden Holtby, 7
  Tuukka Rask, 7

==== Playoff: Goals against average ====
Goals against average is the average number of goals a goaltender allows over a 60-minute period (the regulation length of a game). It is calculated by multiplying the goals against by 60 minutes, then dividing by the total minutes played.

Minimum 25 games played

1. Lorne Chabot, 1.530
2. Dave Kerr, 1.743
3. Patrick Lalime, 1.765
4. Gerry McNeil, 1.839
5. Clint Benedict, 1.862
6. Tiny Thompson, 1.877
7. John Ross Roach, 1.894
8. George Hainsworth, 1.929
9. Turk Broda, 1.982
10. Dominik Hašek, 2.017
11. Martin Brodeur, 2.019
12. **Jake Allen**, 2.063
13. Bill Durnan, 2.070
14. Tim Thomas, 2.080
15. Jean-Sébastien Giguère, 2.084
16. Chris Osgood, 2.094
17. Jacques Plante, 2.122
18. Braden Holtby, 2.125
19. Olaf Kölzig, 2.144
20. Marty Turco, 2.165
21. Ed Belfour, 2.166
22. Robin Lehner, 2.186
23. **Matt Murray**, 2.190
24. Tuukka Rask, 2.220
25. Ron Tugnutt, 2.267

==== Playoff: Saves ====
1. Patrick Roy, 6,559
2. Martin Brodeur, 4,830
3. Marc-André Fleury, 4,446
4. Ed Belfour, 4,117
5. Grant Fuhr, 3,777
6. Curtis Joseph, 3,599
7. Henrik Lundqvist, 3,567
8. **Andrei Vasilevskiy**, 3,452
9. Billy Smith, 3,306
10. Glenn Hall, 3,285
11. Tom Barrasso, 3,218
12. Mike Vernon, 3,154
13. **Sergei Bobrovsky**, 3,055
14. Andy Moog, 3,046
15. Dominik Hašek, 3,037
16. Tuukka Rask, 2,992
17. Ken Dryden, 2,953
18. Chris Osgood, 2,918
19. Tony Esposito, 2,867
20. Jacques Plante, 2,790
21. Corey Crawford, 2,676
22. Braden Holtby, 2,675
23. **Frederik Andersen**, 2,521
24. Jonathan Quick, 2,514
25. Carey Price, 2,489

==== Playoff: Save percentage ====
Save percentage is the percentage of shots on goal that a goaltender stops. It is calculated by dividing the number of saves by the number of shots on goal.

Minimum 25 games played

1. Tim Thomas, .9326
2. Jonas Hiller, .9300
3. Craig Anderson, .9288
4. **Igor Shesterkin**, .9276
5. Olaf Kolzig, .9273
6. Patrick Lalime, .9264
7. Braden Holtby, .9262
8. Jean-Sébastien Giguère, .9253
9. Tuukka Rask, .9252
10. Dominik Hašek, .9251
11. Mike Smith, .9244
12. Ben Bishop, .9242
13. **Jake Allen**, .9240
14. Johnny Bower, .9237
15. Henrik Lundqvist, .9215
16. Miikka Kiprusoff, .9210
17. Jonathan Quick, .9205
18. **Matt Murray**, .9204
19. Ed Belfour, .9198
20. Ron Tugnutt, .9191
21. Robin Lehner, .91903
22. Jaroslav Halák, .91899
23. Carey Price, .9188
24. Anton Khudobin, .9187
25. Martin Brodeur, .9186

==== Playoff: Minutes ====
1. Patrick Roy, 15,205
2. Martin Brodeur, 12,717
3. Marc-André Fleury, 10,207
4. Ed Belfour, 9,943
5. Grant Fuhr, 8,825
6. Mike Vernon, 8,208
7. Curtis Joseph, 8,105
8. Henrik Lundqvist, 7,936
9. **Andrei Vasilevskiy**, 7,702
10. Chris Osgood, 7,651
11. Billy Smith, 7,637
12. Andy Moog, 7,444
13. Dominik Hašek, 7,317
14. Tom Barrasso, 6,952
15. **Sergei Bobrovsky**, 6,922
16. Glenn Hall, 6,892
17. Ken Dryden, 6,826
18. Jacques Plante, 6,646
19. Tuukka Rask, 6,541
20. Turk Broda, 6,387
21. Terry Sawchuk, 6,289
22. **Frederik Andersen**, 6,215
23. Corey Crawford, 6,053
24. Braden Holtby, 6,013
25. Tony Esposito, 5,991

==== Playoff: Points ====
1. Grant Fuhr, 14
2. Martin Brodeur, 13
3. Patrick Roy, 11
4. Tom Barrasso, 7
5. Kirk McLean, 6
  Pekka Rinne, 6
7. Murray Bannerman, 5
  Ron Hextall, 5
  Mike Vernon, 5
  Chris Osgood, 5
11. Ken Dryden, 4
  Glenn Healy, 4
  Réjean Lemelin, 4
  Andy Moog, 4
  Marc-André Fleury, 4
  Ben Bishop, 4
  Braden Holtby, 4
18. Jon Casey, 3
  Tim Cheveldae, 3
  Gilles Gilbert, 3
  Mario Gosselin, 3
  Dominik Hašek, 3
  Greg Stefan, 3
  John Vanbiesbrouck, 3
  Ray Emery, 3
  Mike Smith, 3
  **Igor Shesterkin**, 3

=== Active leaders (goaltenders) ===
==== Regular season: Games played (active) ====
1. Sergei Bobrovsky, 806
2. Connor Hellebuyck, 625
3. Semyon Varlamov, 621
4. Andrei Vasilevskiy, 598
5. Jacob Markström, 578
6. Cam Talbot, 567
7. John Gibson, 563
8. Frederik Andersen, 552
9. James Reimer, 539
10. Jake Allen, 497
11. Darcy Kuemper, 489
12. Juuse Saros, 467
13. Petr Mrázek, 438
14. Philipp Grubauer, 402
15. Jordan Binnington, 377

==== Regular season: Wins (active) ====
1. Sergei Bobrovsky, 456
2. Andrei Vasilevskiy, 370
3. Connor Hellebuyck, 345
4. Frederik Andersen, 324
5. Semyon Varlamov, 289
6. Cam Talbot, 278
7. Jacob Markström, 264
8. John Gibson, 233
9. James Reimer, 232
10. Juuse Saros, 230
11. Darcy Kuemper, 228
12. Jake Allen, 225
13. Linus Ullmark, 191
14. Igor Shesterkin, 187
15. Jordan Binnington, 186

==== Regular season: Shutouts (active) ====
A goaltender achieves a shutout when he does not allow a goal against him, and plays the full game.

1. Sergei Bobrovsky, 53
2. Connor Hellebuyck, 45
3. Andrei Vasilevskiy, 42
4. Semyon Varlamov, 41
5. Darcy Kuemper, 39
6. Cam Talbot, 33
7. James Reimer, 32
8. Jake Allen, 29
  Ilya Sorokin, 29
10. Frederik Andersen, 28
  John Gibson, 28
12. Juuse Saros, 27
13. Petr Mrázek, 26
14. Jacob Markström, 25
15. Tristan Jarry, 23

==== Regular season: Goals against average (active) ====
Goals against average is the average number of goals a goaltender allows over a 60-minute period (the regulation length of a game). It is calculated by multiplying the goals against by 60 minutes, then dividing by the total minutes played.

Minimum 250 games played

1. Andrei Vasilevskiy, 2.50
2. Igor Shesterkin, 2.52
3. Jake Oettinger, 2.54
4. Darcy Kuemper, 2.57
  Linus Ullmark, 2.57
6. Connor Hellebuyck, 2.58
7. Frederik Andersen, 2.59
8. Ilya Sorokin, 2.60
9. Sergei Bobrovsky, 2.61
10. Semyon Varlamov, 2.65
  Philipp Grubauer 2.65
12. Cam Talbot, 2.69
13. Jacob Markström, 2.73
14. Juuse Saros, 2.74
15. Jake Allen, 2.75

==== Regular season: Saves (active) ====
1. Sergei Bobrovsky, 21,024
2. Semyon Varlamov, 17,053
3. Connor Hellebuyck, 17,045
4. Andrei Vasilevskiy, 16,126
5. John Gibson, 15,351
6. Cam Talbot, 14,749
7. Jacob Markström, 14,703
8. Frederik Andersen, 14,476
9. James Reimer, 14,233
10. Juuse Saros, 12,650
11. Jake Allen, 12,605
12. Darcy Kuemper, 12,413
13. Petr Mrázek, 11,117
14. Philipp Grubauer, 9,664
15. Jordan Binnington, 9,626

==== Regular season: Save percentage (active) ====
Save percentage is the percentage of shots on goal that a goaltender stops. It is calculated by dividing the number of saves by the number of shots on goal.

Minimum 250 games played

1. Igor Shesterkin, .917
  Andrei Vasilevskiy, .917
3. Semyon Varlamov, .916
  Connor Hellebuyck, .916
5. Ilya Sorokin, .915
6. Linus Ullmark, .914
7. Frederik Andersen, .913
  Darcy Kuemper, .913
9. Sergei Bobrovsky, .912
  Juuse Saros, .912
11. Cam Talbot, .911
12. Matt Murray, .910
  Jake Oettinger, .910
14. John Gibson, .909
  James Reimer, .909
  Thatcher Demko, .909

==== Regular season: Minutes (active) ====
1. Sergei Bobrovsky, 46,535
2. Connor Hellebuyck, 36,400
3. Semyon Varlamov, 35,630
4. Andrei Vasilevskiy, 35,223
5. Jacob Markström, 33,282
6. Cam Talbot, 32,174
7. Frederik Andersen, 31,988
8. John Gibson, 31,985
9. James Reimer, 29,652
10. Jake Allen, 28,119

==== Regular season: Points (active) ====
1. Andrei Vasilevskiy, 24
2. Jacob Markström, 23
3. Frederik Andersen, 17
4. Sergei Bobrovsky, 15
5. Tristan Jarry, 13
6. Connor Hellebuyck, 10
7. Semyon Varlamov, 8
  Juuse Saros, 8
  Cam Talbot, 8
  Philipp Grubauer, 8
  John Gibson, 8

==== Playoff: Games played (active) ====
1. Andrei Vasilevskiy, 127
2. Sergei Bobrovsky, 117
3. Frederik Andersen, 101
4. Jake Oettinger, 71
5. Semyon Varlamov, 65
6. Connor Hellebuyck, 58
7. Stuart Skinner, 53
8. Matt Murray, 52
9. Jordan Binnington, 48
10. Philipp Grubauer, 47

==== Playoff: Wins (active) ====
1. Andrei Vasilevskiy, 70
2. Sergei Bobrovsky, 61
3. Frederik Andersen, 59
4. Jake Oettinger, 34
5. Semyon Varlamov, 32
6. Matt Murray, 29
7. Philipp Grubauer, 26
  Stuart Skinner, 26
9. Connor Hellebuyck, 24
10. Jordan Binnington, 23
  Igor Shesterkin, 23
  Carter Hart, 23

==== Playoff: Shutouts (active) ====
A goaltender achieves a shutout when he does not allow a goal against him, and plays the full game.

1. Frederik Andersen, 8
  Andrei Vasilevskiy, 8
3. Matt Murray, 6
  Cam Talbot, 6
  Sergei Bobrovsky, 6
6. Petr Mrázek, 5
  Connor Hellebuyck, 5
8. Semyon Varlamov, 4
  Stuart Skinner, 4
10. Adin Hill, 3

==== Playoff: Goals against average (active) ====
Goals against average is the average number of goals a goaltender allows over a 60-minute period (the regulation length of a game). It is calculated by multiplying the goals against by 60 minutes, then dividing by the total minutes played.

Minimum 25 games played

1. Jake Allen, 2.063
2. Matt Murray, 2.190
3. Frederik Andersen, 2.317
4. Igor Shesterkin, 2.407
5. Adin Hill, 2.412
6. Petr Mrázek, 2.427
7. Andrei Vasilevskiy, 2.431
8. Carter Hart, 2.438
9. Semyon Varlamov, 2.44
10. Jeremy Swayman, 2.510

==== Playoff: Saves (active) ====
1. Andrei Vasilevskiy, 3,452
2. Sergei Bobrovsky, 3,055
3. Frederik Andersen, 2,521
4. Jake Oettinger, 1,836
5. Semyon Varlamov, 1,764
6. Connor Hellebuyck, 1,566
7. Igor Shesterkin, 1,371
8. Matt Murray, 1,306
9. Jordan Binnington, 1,263
10. Stuart Skinner, 1,211

==== Playoff: Save percentage (active) ====
Save percentage is the percentage of shots on goal that a goaltender stops. It is calculated by dividing the number of saves by the number of shots on goal.

Minimum 25 games played

1. Igor Shesterkin, .9276
2. Jake Allen, .9240
3. Matt Murray, .9204
4. Jeremy Swayman, .9184
5. Semyon Varlamov, .918
6. Andrei Vasilevskiy, .9171
7. Adin Hill, .9167
8. Cam Talbot, .9150
9. Frederik Andersen, .9131
10. John Gibson, .9125

==== Playoff: Minutes (active) ====
1. Andrei Vasilevskiy, 7,701
2. Sergei Bobrovsky, 6,922
3. Frederik Andersen, 6,214
4. Jake Oettinger, 4,176
5. Semyon Varlamov, 3,860
6. Connor Hellebuyck, 3,498
7. Matt Murray, 3,097
8. Stuart Skinner, 3,048
9. Jordan Binnington, 2,827
10. Philipp Grubauer, 2,722

==== Playoff: Points (active) ====
1. Igor Shesterkin, 3
2. Sergei Bobrovsky, 2
  Philipp Grubauer, 2
4. Jacob Markström, 1
  Darcy Kuemper, 1
  Cam Talbot, 1
  Jordan Binnington, 1
  Andrei Vasilevskiy, 1
  Stuart Skinner, 1
  Jake Oettinger, 1

== Coaches ==
The statistics listed include the 2025–26 NHL regular season and the 2025 playoffs.

=== All-time leaders (coaches) ===
Active coaches (during 2025–26 NHL season) are listed in boldface.

==== Regular season: Games coached ====
1. Scotty Bowman, 2,141
2. **Paul Maurice**, 2,012
3. **Lindy Ruff**, 1,938
4. **Joel Quenneville**, 1,850
5. Barry Trotz, 1,812
6. John Tortorella, 1,628
7. Al Arbour, 1,607
8. Ken Hitchcock, 1,598
9. **Peter Laviolette**, 1,594
10. Darryl Sutter, 1,479

==== Regular season: Coaching wins ====
1. Scotty Bowman, 1,244
2. **Joel Quenneville**, 1,012
3. **Paul Maurice**, 956
4. **Lindy Ruff**, 950
5. Barry Trotz, 914
6. Ken Hitchcock, 849
7. **Peter Laviolette**, 846
8. Al Arbour, 782
9. John Tortorella, 777
10. Darryl Sutter, 737

==== Regular season: Coaching points percentage ====
Points percentage is determined by the number of points a team earns (equal to the number of ties and overtime losses, plus twice the number of wins) divided by the total possible points (equal to twice the number of games).

Minimum 200 games coached

1. Tom Johnson, .738
2. **Rod Brind'Amour**, .659
3. Scotty Bowman, .657
4. Claude Ruel, .648
5. **Jon Cooper**, .639
6. Toe Blake, .634
7. **Jim Montgomery**, .632
8. Bruce Cassidy, .630
9. Bruce Boudreau, .626
10. **Sheldon Keefe**, .626
11. Floyd Smith, .626
12. Kris Knoblauch, .624
13. **Jared Bednar**, .617
14. Fred Shero, .612
15. **Joel Quenneville**, .610
16. **Mike Babcock**, .608
17. **Spencer Carbery**, .604
18. Gerry Cheevers, .604
19. Dave Lewis, .604
20. Dean Evason, .602

==== Playoff: Games coached ====
1. Scotty Bowman, 353
2. **Joel Quenneville**, 237
3. Al Arbour, 209
4. Dick Irvin, Sr., 190
5. Pat Quinn, 183
6. Darryl Sutter, 182
7. **Peter DeBoer**, 179
8. Mike Keenan, 173
9. **Peter Laviolette**, 170
10. Ken Hitchcock, 168
11. **Mike Babcock**, 164
12. Barry Trotz, 162
13. **Jon Cooper**, 162
14. **Paul Maurice**, 160
15. Alain Vigneault, 155
16. Pat Burns, 149
17. **Lindy Ruff**, 145
18. John Tortorella, 142
19. Glen Sather, 126
20. Claude Julien, 124

==== Playoff: Coaching wins ====
1. Scotty Bowman, 223
2. **Joel Quenneville**, 127
3. Al Arbour, 123
4. Dick Irvin, 100
5. **Peter DeBoer**, 97
6. Mike Keenan, 96
7. Darryl Sutter, 94
8. Pat Quinn, 94
9. **Jon Cooper**, 91
10. **Mike Babcock**, 90

==== Playoff: Coaching win percentage ====
Minimum 25 games coached

1. Glen Sather, .706
2. Toe Blake, .689
3. Claude Ruel, .667
4. Scotty Bowman, .632
5. Jean Perron, .625
6. Hap Day, .613
7. Tommy Gorman, .600
8. Larry Robinson, .596
9. Guy Boucher, .595
10. **Jared Bednar**, .594

==== Stanley Cups ====
1. Scotty Bowman, 9
2. Toe Blake, 8
3. Hap Day, 5
4. Al Arbour, 4
  Punch Imlach, 4
  Dick Irvin, 4
  Glen Sather, 4
8. Jack Adams, 3
  Lester Patrick, 3
  Pete Green, 3
  Tommy Ivan, 3
  **Joel Quenneville**, 3

=== Active leaders (coaches) ===
==== Regular season: Games coached (active) ====
1. Paul Maurice, 2,013
2. Lindy Ruff, 1,938
3. Joel Quenneville, 1,850
4. Peter Laviolette, 1594
5. Mike Babcock, 1301

==== Regular season: Coaching wins (active) ====
1. Joel Quenneville, 1,012
2. Paul Maurice, 956
3. Lindy Ruff, 950
4. Peter Laviolette, 846
5. Mike Babcock, 700

==== Regular season: Coaching points percentage (active) ====
Points percentage is determined by the number of points a team earns (equal to the number of ties and overtime losses, plus twice the number of wins) divided by the total possible points (equal to twice the number of games).

Minimum 200 games coached

1. Rod Brind'Amour, .659
2. Jon Cooper, .639
3. Jim Montgomery, .632
4. Sheldon Keefe, .626
5. Jared Bednar, .617

==== Playoff: Games coached (active) ====
1. Joel Quenneville, 237
2. Peter DeBoer, 179
3. Peter Laviolette, 170
4. Mike Babcock, 164
5. Jon Cooper, 162

==== Playoff: Coaching wins (active) ====
1. Joel Quenneville, 127
2. Peter DeBoer, 97
3. Jon Cooper, 91
4. Mike Babcock, 90
5. Peter Laviolette, 88

==== Stanley Cups (active) ====
1. Joel Quenneville, 3
2. Jon Cooper, 2
  Mike Sullivan, 2
  Paul Maurice, 2
5. Jared Bednar, 1
  Mike Babcock, 1
  Peter Laviolette, 1
  Rod Brind'Amour, 1

== See also ==
- List of NHL statistical leaders by country of birth
