= Shot on goal =

A shot on goal may refer to, in various sports:

- Shot on goal (association football)
- Shot on goal (ice hockey)
