= Analytics in ice hockey =

Ice hockey statistics

In ice hockey, analytics is the analysis of the characteristics of hockey players and teams through the use of statistics and other tools to gain a greater understanding of the effects of their performance. Three commonly used basic statistics in ice hockey analytics are "Corsi" and "Fenwick", both of which use shot attempts to approximate puck possession, and "PDO", which is often considered a measure of luck. However, new statistics are being created every year, with "RAPM", regularized adjusted plus-minus, and "xG", expected goals, being created very recently in regards to hockey even though they have been around in other sports before. RAPM tries to isolate a player's play driving ability based on multiple factors, while xG tries to show how many goals a player is expected to add to their team independent of shooting and goalie talent.

Hockey Hall of Fame coach Roger Nielson is credited as being an early pioneer of analytics and used measures of his own invention as early as the late 1960s during his tenure with the Peterborough Petes. In modern usage, analytics have traditionally been the domain of hockey bloggers and amateur statisticians. They have been increasingly adopted by National Hockey League (NHL) organizations themselves, and reached mainstream usage when the NHL partnered with SAP SE to create an "enhanced" statistical package that coincided with the launch of a new website featuring analytical statistics during the 2014–15 season.

== Common statistics ==
=== Corsi ===
Corsi, called shot attempts (SAT) by the NHL, is the sum of shots on goal, missed shots and blocked shots. It is named after coach Jim Corsi, but was developed by an Edmonton Oilers blogger and fan who developed the statistic to better measure the workload of a goaltender during a game. Today Corsi is used to approximate shot attempt differential for both teams and players, which can then be used to predict future goal differentials. If a team is losing goal differential halfway through the season, but possesses a high Corsi, the team is creating more chances than their opponents which should result in a better goal differential as the team plays more games. Corsi is used to approximate puck possession – the length of time a player's team controls the puck – and is typically measured as either a ratio (like plus-minus) of shot attempts for less shot attempts against, or as a percentage. According to blogger Kent Wilson, most players will have a Corsi For percentage (CF%) between 40 and 60. A player or team ranked above 55% is often considered "elite".

=== Fenwick ===
Fenwick, called unblocked shot attempts (USAT) by the NHL, is a variant of Corsi that counts only shots on goal and missed shots; blocked shots, either for or against are not included. It is named after blogger Matt Fenwick and is viewed as having a stronger correlation to scoring chances. Fenwick is used to help judge team and player performances that strategically use shot blocking as part of their game play. A player that blocks a high volume of shots will most likely have a lower Corsi due to allowing more shot attempts than average. Fenwick by itself is less reliable than Corsi, but is the foundation for most Expected Goals models.

=== PDO ===
PDO, called SPSV% by the NHL, is the sum of a team's shooting percentage and its save percentage. The sum is then multiplied by 100 and that total is the team’s PDO. The sum is also used separately to see if a team should expect a regression or improvement. PDO is usually measured at even strength, and, based on the theory that most teams will ultimately regress toward a sum of 100, is often viewed as a proxy for how lucky a team is. According to Wilson, a player or team with a PDO over 102 is "probably not as good as they seem", while a player or team below 98 likely is better than they appear. PDO can also track individual players by taking the sum of their shooting percentage and the team's save percentage and then multiplying the sum by 100.

PDO is not an acronym. It comes from the online handle of Brian King, the first to propose it, for forums and Counter-Strike.

=== Zone starts ===
Zone starts is the ratio of how many face-offs a player is on for in the offensive zone relative to the defensive zone. A player who has a high zone start ratio will often have increased Corsi numbers due to starting in the offensive zone, while a player with a low zone start ratio will often have depressed Corsi numbers. Strategically, coaches may give their best offensive players more offensive zone starts to try and create extra scoring chances, while a team's best defensive players will typically have more defensive zone starts. The formula for Zone starts is: SZ% = offensive zone starts / (offensive + defensive zone starts). In recent time, the use of zone starts in analysis has decreased. It has been determined that "on-the-fly" shifts account for more than half (58%) of all shifts.

== New statistics ==
=== RAPM ===
RAPM (Regularized Adjusted Plus-Minus) is a new hockey statistic based on the RAPM statistic used in basketball. Instead of tracking a player's points, it tracks a player's shots, because they occur more often than goals, which is required to give the statistic a high number of samples. RAPM uses a mathematical model with ridge regression that takes into account raw shot creation, Corsi and xG, and outside influences such as Shot Volume, Shot Location (xG RAPM only), Teammate Impact, Competition Impact, Score Effects, Zone Starts, Schedule, Shot Type (xG RAPM only), and Even Strength State.

There is a Corsi RAPM model that uses raw shot differential and a xG RAPM model that factors for shot location and type. The goal of RAPM is to isolate a player's play driving ability and quantify it with a value.

=== xG ===
xG models use USAT and give each shot attempt a value depending on shot location and type. A shot from the slot might get a score of 0.30, whereas, a shot from the point may only get a score of 0.02. The model also takes into account if these shots are coming off rebounds or rush chances. This metric answers the problems of Corsi, which are that it values every shot equally. xG models essentially track which players are taking high quality shots. The more high quality shots a player creates, the more likely they are to score.

== Score effects and situational modifiers ==
While hockey's analytical statistics can be used to measure in any manpower situation, they are most often expressed relative to play at even strength. The statistics can also be viewed relative to "score effects". Corsi close and Corsi tied, for instance, are restricted to when one team leads by one goal or when the game is tied, respectively. The use of "close" stats is intended to reflect the fact that a team leading a game will tend to play more defensively, meaning the trailing team will often take more shot attempts.

Corsi close was scrutinized on the grounds that it did not predict future goals as well as unadjusted Corsi, thus diminishing its value. Weighting each shot by the score situation (score adjustment) has taken over as the method to adjust for score effects. The situation of play also has to be taken into account during any score analysis.

== See also ==
- Sabermetrics
- Sports analytics
- Ice hockey
- USA Hockey
