= Shot quality =

Statistic in ice hockey

Shot quality is a term used in the statistical analysis of ice hockey to indicate the probability that a given shot will result in a goal, based on factors such as the distance of the shot taken, the type of shot (wrist shot, slapshot, backhand, etc.) and other factors such as the number of players on the ice for each team. It is used to isolate the impact of goaltending performance. By comparing the number of goals allowed to the total of the shot quality figures for each shot against, a goaltender can be rated relative to average performance across the league.

As a theoretical example, if a wrist shot from 15 feet at even strength resulted in a goal 15% of the time, it would be assigned a shot quality of 0.15. If a goaltender faced ten such shots in a game, then they would be expected to yield 1.5 goals (10 * 0.15). Comparing actual results against the expected goals figure of 1.5 yields a measure of goaltending performance that is somewhat isolated from the effects of the other players on the ice.

The concept was first publicly presented in a paper by Alan Ryder of Hockey Analytics, and has since been utilized in slightly varying fashion by a number of blog-based hockey analysts such as the Forechecker at On The Forecheck, and JavaGeek at Hockey Numbers.
