= Corsi (statistic) =

Statistic used in the game of ice hockey

Corsi is an advanced statistic used in the game of ice hockey to measure shot attempt differential while at even strength play. This includes shots on goal, missed shots on goal, and blocked shot attempts towards the opposition's net minus the same shot attempts directed at your own team's net.

== History ==
The Corsi number was named by Tim Barnes, a financial analyst from Chicago working under the pseudonym Vic Ferrari. He had heard former Buffalo Sabres general manager Darcy Regier talking about shot differential on the radio, and then proceeded to develop a formula to accurately display shot differential. Ferrari originally wanted to name it the Regier number, but he didn't think it sounded right. He then considered calling it the Ruff number after former Buffalo Sabres head coach Lindy Ruff but he didn't think that was appropriate either. Ferrari ended up searching Buffalo Sabres staff, found a picture of Jim Corsi, and chose his name because he liked Corsi's mustache.

== Formulae ==
- Corsi For (CF) = Shot attempts for at even strength: Shots + Blocks + Misses
- Corsi Against (CA) = Shot attempts against at even strength: Shots + Blocks + Misses
- Corsi (C) = CF - CA
- Corsi For % (CF%) = CF / (CF + CA)
- Corsi For % Relative (CF% Rel) = CF% - CFOff% (On-Ice Corsi For % – Off-Ice Corsi For %)
- Corsi Per 60 Minutes at Even Strength (C/60) = (CF - CA) * 60 / TOI
- Relative Corsi per 60 Minutes at Even Strength (Crel/60) = CF/60 - CFoff/60 = On-Ice Corsi For / 60 Minutes - Off-Ice Corsi For / 60 Minutes

Off-Ice Corsi is shot attempts taken by the player’s team when the player is not on the ice, but in games where the player is in the lineup.

== Relevance ==
Because shot attempts are taken almost exclusively in the offensive zone, Corsi numbers provide an indication of the time a team spends in the offensive zone, versus time spent in their defensive zone. Positive Corsi numbers indicate the team spends more time in the offensive zone than the defensive zone, while negative Corsi shows the opposite. This makes Corsi a proxy for "puck possession," although not without controversy. Corsi can be broken down into four categories: Corsi Ahead, Corsi Even, Corsi Close, and Corsi behind. In order, the categories refer to what a team or player's Corsi number is when they are ahead in the game, when the game is tied, when the score of the game only differs by one goal, and when they are behind, in that order. This can be used to try and eliminate score effects, such as a leading team no longer trying to score and only prevent dangerous chances against.

Alternatively, Corsi can be viewed as simply providing a metric closely tied to shots, but with a greater sample size. Only looking at a team's share of goals can be problematic in small sample sizes because goals are relatively rare and highly random events. While not every shot has the same chance of becoming a goal, we can average out that unknown value and assume a random shot has some average chance of scoring (about 8% in the NHL 5v5). This lets us greatly increase our sample size of events as there will be about 12 shots per goal. Expanding shots to also include missed and blocked shots gets us to about 25 Corsi per goal. This increased sample size means that most players will be on the ice for a statistically relevant number of Corsi events each game. This allows for much a more rapid quantitative evaluation of how a team is performing with a player on the ice.

== Criticisms ==
While Corsi may provide a more accurate evaluation of players' contributions to a winning effort than plus-minus (giving a plus to players who are on the ice when a goal is scored and a minus to players who are on the ice when a goal is scored on their own net), it does have its own criticisms. For example, a player is on the ice for 30 shots on net and 20 shots against. Based on this, his Corsi number will be +10, but based on his actual play on the ice, he really created five shot attempts and gave up 15 shot attempts to the other team, meaning his Corsi number should actually be -10. This is because he was playing with better players around him and that boosted his Corsi number. Essentially, a good player playing consistently with bad players will have a lower Corsi number, while a good player playing with great players will get a boost. For this reason, additional advanced metrics, for instance using raw Corsi values adjusted against frequent on-ice teammates', can provide a more accurate assessment of individual players' contributions.

Another issue is that Corsi does little to capture the ability of an NHL superstar to influence the game. Ending with the 2020-2021 regular season and only looking at 5v5 stats, Connor McDavid has been on the ice for 6776 Corsi for events and 397 goals for. Meanwhile a more average fourth liner Pierre-Edouard Bellemare has been on the ice for 4663 Corsi for events and 143 Goals for. This translates to a 5.86% vs 3.07% Corsi Shooting percentage when McDavid is on ice vs when Bellemare is on ice. Thus, caution needs to be taken when trying to draw too many conclusions about a player's ability from their Corsi stats.

== See also ==
- Analytics (ice hockey)
- Fenwick
