= Patrik Laine =

Finnish ice hockey player (born 1998)

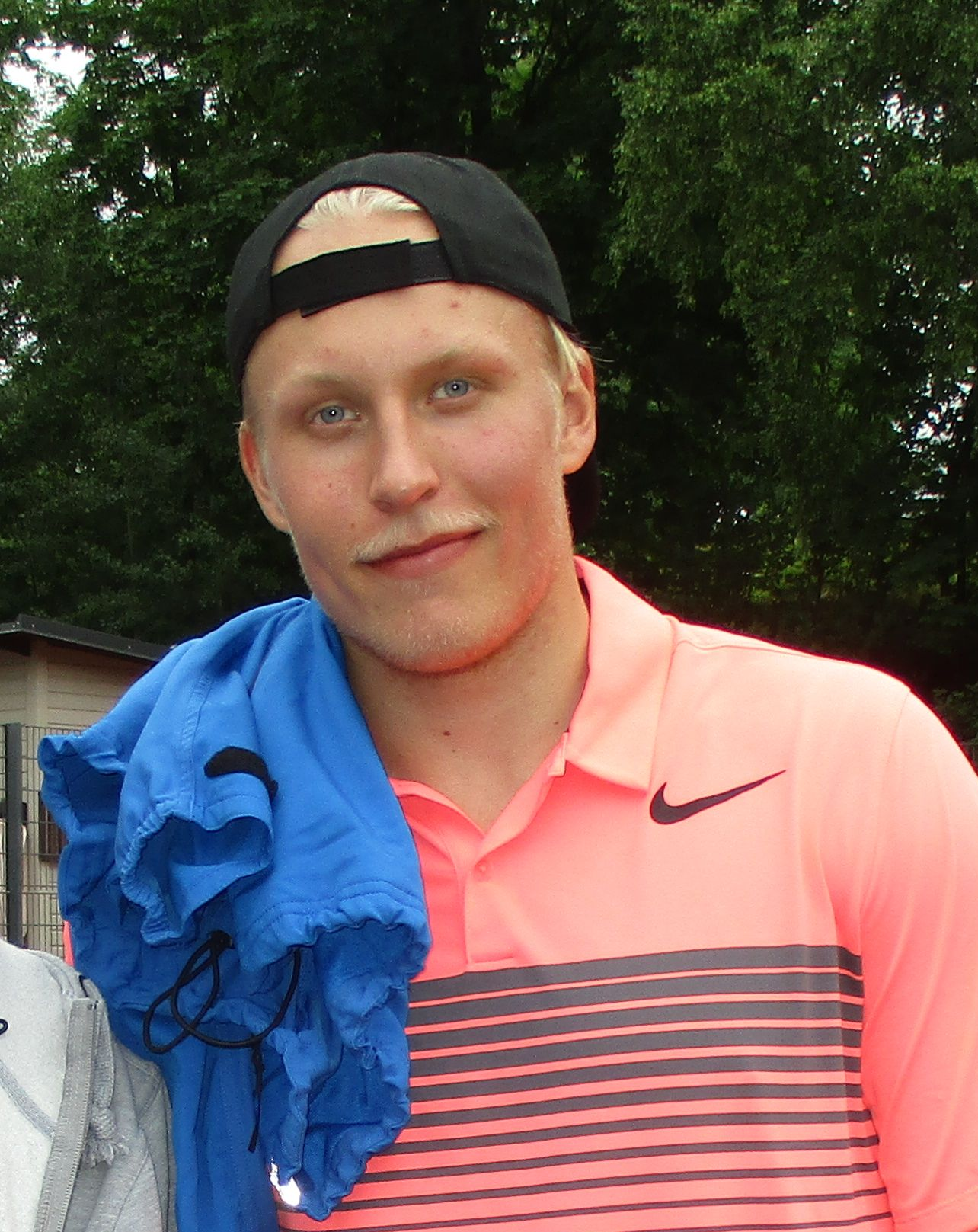
- Laine in 2017
- Born: 19 April 1998 (age 28) Tampere, Finland
- Height: 6 ft 4 in (193 cm)
- Weight: 208 lb (94 kg; 14 st 12 lb)
- Position: Right wing
- Shoots: Right
- NHL team Former teams: Free agent Tappara; Winnipeg Jets; Columbus Blue Jackets; Montreal Canadiens
- National team: Finland
- NHL draft: 2nd overall, 2016; Winnipeg Jets
- Playing career: 2014–present

Patrik Laine (Finnish pronunciation: [ˈpɑtrik ˈlɑi̯ne]; born 19 April 1998) is a Finnish professional ice hockey player who is a right winger and an unrestricted free agent. He most recently played for the Montreal Canadiens of the National Hockey League (NHL). He was selected second overall by the Winnipeg Jets in the 2016 NHL entry draft. Laine has also previously played for the Columbus Blue Jackets.

== Early life ==
Laine began playing hockey at four years old and was primarily a goaltender, before permanently switching to forward as a youth at the advice of his father. At age 16, he left school to focus on hockey full-time.

== Playing career ==
=== Tappara (2015–2016) ===
Laine started to play hockey in Ilves at age four, but soon changed to local competitor Tappara. He made his Liiga debut at age 16 during the 2014–15 season with Tappara, logging six games and scoring one point. The following season, Laine scored 17 goals and 16 assists for a total of 33 points over a span of 46 games with the club.

Prior to his NHL draft-eligible season, Laine was ranked in numerous hockey publications as the fourth-best prospect entering the 2016 NHL entry draft. Due to strong play with Tappara early in the season and an impressive showing at the 2015 IIHF World U18 Championships, where he scored eight goals in seven games, Laine's ranking on most draft projections rose from the season prior, when he had been widely considered a mid-first-round prospect.

After a dominant performance at the 2016 World Junior Ice Hockey Championships, Laine received greater attention from scouts and casual observers alike. By January 2016, he had moved up the ranking on most draft lists to second overall. McKeen's Hockey notably ranked Laine first overall on its January 2016 list. According to hockey analyst Bob McKenzie's mid-season draft report, Laine had become the "clear consensus No. 2 choice" over fellow Finnish prospect Jesse Puljujärvi. This was due to what scouts described as a "'dynamic' element", with one scout elaborating, "Laine maybe is more of a pure goal scorer, a game-breaker with a little higher offensive ceiling."

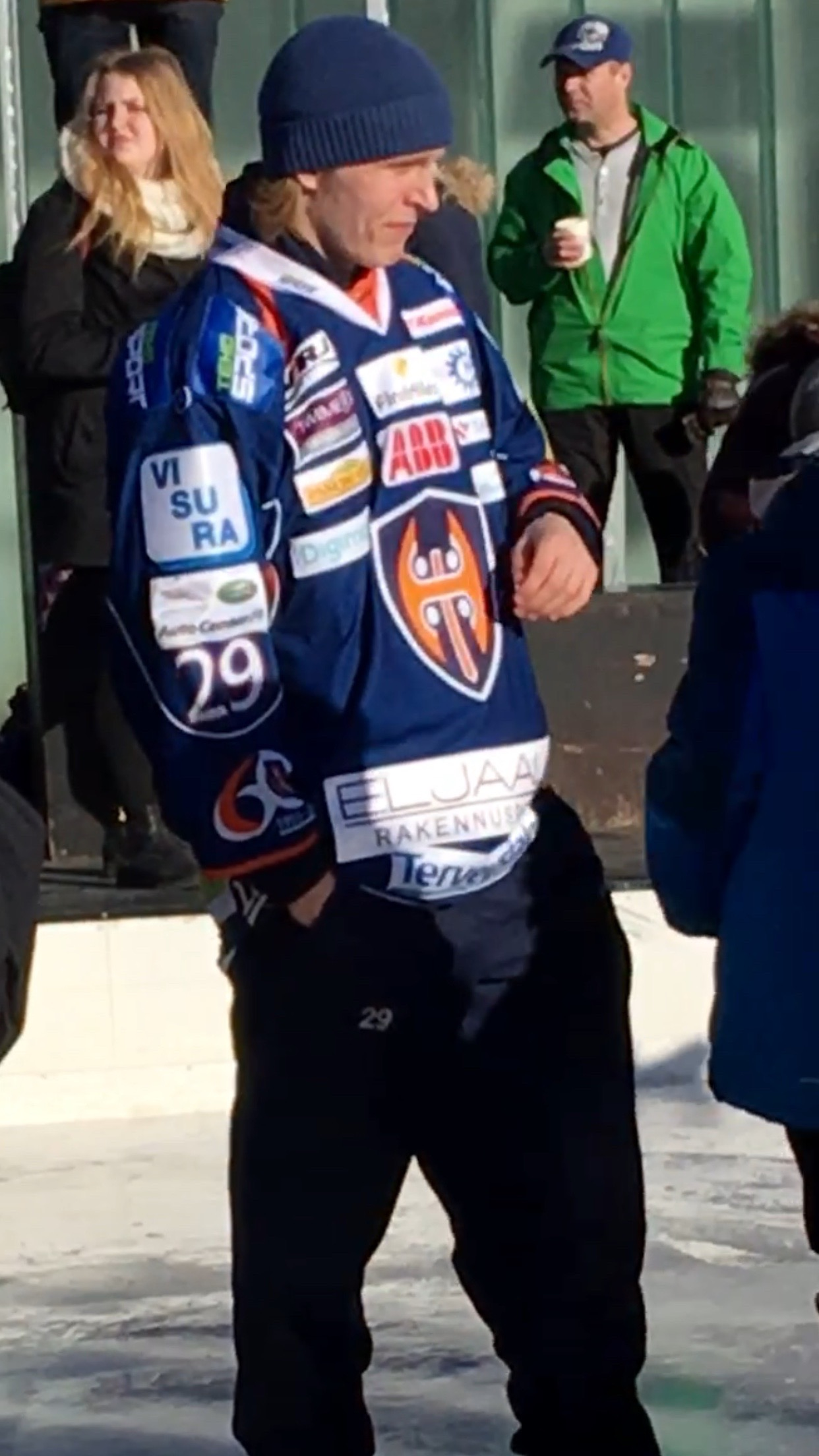
Laine with Tappara at Helsinki Railway Square in March 2016

By February 2016, Laine was considered a potential challenger for first overall at that year's draft, challenging the previous consensus choice, Auston Matthews. When asked if Matthews was still the favorite to be selected first overall in the June 2016 draft, several scouts expressed they "had to think long and hard about it . . . Laine is right there". One scout justified that "in the end, we favoured the centre over the winger but I don’t think it’s a reach at all to see Laine going first overall. A lot of our European scouts who see these guys think Laine is better".

In April 2016, McKenzie reported Laine had further closed the gap with Matthews, with two of the 10 NHL scouts surveyed by McKenzie reporting they would choose Laine ahead of Matthews. The other scouts in McKenzie's April report, meanwhile, stated they needed to think "long and hard about their decision" to rank Matthews ahead of Laine. The National Post would further add to this narrative, publishing an article with a headline proclaiming Laine to be the "NHL draft's true No. 1".

That same month, Laine's tenure with Tappara ended with his team finishing third overall in the Liiga standings and thus qualifying for the subsequent post-season. He played a pivotal role in the semifinal series against second-ranked Kärpät, scoring six goals in the seven-game series, including three last-minute goals to tie games four, five and six; two of those goals occurred in the final minute of the third period of their respective games, with Laine's Game six goal being scored at 19:59 of the third period with one second remaining on the clock. With his last-second tying goal in Game six, his eighth of the playoffs, Laine broke Liiga's previous goal-scoring record of seven goals in a single rookie playoff campaign. Laine and Tappara consequently defeated Kärpät and advanced to the 2016 Liiga Finals. Trailing 2–1 in the series against HIFK, Tappara coach Jussi Tapola moved Laine to the team's first line alongside Jani Lajunen and leading scorer Kristian Kuusela for Game four, where Laine recorded a goal and two assists to lead his team to a 2–2 series tie. This was Laine's first ever game on Tappara's top line—for the first part of the 2015–16 campaign he had played with Jere Karjalainen, Veli-Matti Savinainen and Stephen Dixon, while for the majority of the season, he played on the team's second line with Arttu Ilomäki and Jukka Peltola. For the first 15 games of the playoffs, his line featured Jan-Mikael Järvinen at centre with the aforementioned Peltola on right wing. Laine scored once more in the series-clinching match, as Tappara defeated HIFK in six games to win the Liiga championship title. He was likewise awarded the Jari Kurri Trophy as playoff MVP, finishing the post-season with ten goals and five assists in 18 games.

=== Winnipeg Jets (2016–2021) ===
"We don't talk to Patty anymore. We just talk to everybody else – tell them to give him the puck."

— Jets coach Paul Maurice on Laine, after he had scored two goals against the Toronto Maple Leafs on 21 February 2017.

After being selected second overall by the Winnipeg Jets, Laine agreed to a three-year, entry-level contract with Winnipeg on 3 July 2016, signalling the start to his North American career. On 13 October 2016, he made his National Hockey League (NHL) debut in the Jets' season-opening game against the Carolina Hurricanes in which he scored a goal along with an assist. On 19 October, Laine registered his first career hat-trick in a 5–4 win against the Toronto Maple Leafs, becoming, at 18 years, 183 days old, the youngest player born outside North America to score at least twice in one game in NHL history. This record was bested by fellow Finn Jesperi Kotkaniemi, who, at 18 years, 118 days old, scored twice against the Washington Capitals on 1 November 2018. On 8 November, Laine registered his second NHL hat-trick. On 7 January 2017, Laine suffered a concussion after being hit by Buffalo Sabres defenceman Jake McCabe while the former was receiving a pass. As a result, he missed eight games. Despite his injury, Laine was selected to participate in the 2017 NHL All-Star Game. On 14 February, Laine scored his third NHL hat-trick. A week later, he broke the Winnipeg Jets / Atlanta Thrashers franchise record for the most goals in a single season by a rookie, previously held by Ilya Kovalchuk with 29. By the end of the year, Laine had 36 goals and 28 assists for 64 points, the second-highest in franchise history for a rookie, next to Dany Heatley who had 67 points (26 goals, 41 assists) as a rookie in 2001–02, and the highest since relocation to Winnipeg.

On 25 February 2018, during his second NHL campaign, Laine would score his 30th and 31st goals of the year, making him the seventh teenager in the history of NHL to register consecutive 30-goal seasons. On 6 March, Laine scored his fourth NHL hat-trick in a 3–0 win over the New York Rangers, becoming the third teenager in the history of the NHL to record four three-goal games before their 20th birthday. On 15 March 2018, in a game against the Chicago Blackhawks, Laine extended his point streak to 14 games, which set a new NHL record for the longest point streak by a teenager in league history. His streak ended at 15 games on 20 March 2018 after he failed to collect a point in a game against the Los Angeles Kings. At the conclusion of the 2017–18 season, Laine ranked second for most goals scored in the regular season with 44, behind Alexander Ovechkin's 49. Despite losing the NHL top goal scorer award, Laine became the first teenager in 30 years to score a total of 80 goals, surpassing Sidney Crosby's 75. Laine recorded his first playoff goal in Game One against the Minnesota Wild to help the Jets to their first playoff win in franchise history, 3–2. He likewise became both the youngest player in Jets franchise history, as well as the youngest Finnish player in the NHL, to score a playoff goal at age 19 years, 357 days.

After struggling to score at the beginning of the 2018–19 season, putting up only five points in 12 games, Laine recorded his fifth career hat-trick during the 2018 NHL Global Series in his home country, Finland. His three goals helped the Jets win 4–2 over the Florida Panthers. On 19 November 2018, Laine recorded his sixth career hat-trick against the Vancouver Canucks in a 6–3 win. On 24 November 2018, Laine recorded five goals in an 8–4 win over the St. Louis Blues, becoming the first person since Johan Franzén in February 2011 to accomplish that feat, and the 45th player cumulatively. Laine had only five shots in the game, making him the sixth player in NHL history to score five goals on five shots and the first since Wayne Gretzky in 1984. A few days later on 29 November, Laine scored his 100th goal, becoming the fourth-youngest player in NHL history to score 100 regular season goals.

Without contract as a restricted free agent, Laine traveled to Switzerland to train with SC Bern of the National League (NL). However, on 27 September 2019, he agreed to a two-year, $13.5 million contract extension with the Jets. The 2019–20 shortened season due to the COVID-19 pandemic proved to be a resurgent one for Laine, who scored 63 points in 68 games for a career high 0.93 points per game (PPG). Despite this improvement, his wrist would be injured early into the play-in round of the 2020 Stanley Cup playoffs against the Calgary Flames, whereas the Jets were eliminated in four games.

=== Columbus Blue Jackets (2021–2024) ===
Entering the off-season, rumors circulated that the Jets were interested in trading Laine, including from his own agent; Laine himself dismissed any concern about these rumors in a January 2021 interview. He ultimately played in the season-opening game for Winnipeg against the Calgary Flames on 14 January, scoring two goals and an assist, including the overtime-winning goal, in a 4–3 Jets win; however, was sidelined after suffering an injury during practice a couple days thereafter. On 23 January, before returning from injury, Laine was traded along with forward Jack Roslovic to the Columbus Blue Jackets in exchange for forward Pierre-Luc Dubois and a 2022 third-round pick. On 9 February, controversy again surrounded Laine when, after multiple defensive lapses in a game versus Carolina, he was involved in a verbal altercation with an assistant coach and was subsequently benched for his actions. During his first season in Columbus, he scored 10 goals and 11 assists across 45 games.

On 27 July 2021, Laine, a restricted free agent, accepted a qualifying offer and signed a one-year, $7.5 million contract extension with the Blue Jackets. This was followed by a four-year, $34.8 million contract extension with the team in July 2022. His tenure with the Blue Jackets continued to be plagued by injuries, causing him to miss a significant number of games. After suffering a fractured clavicle in a game against the Toronto Maple Leafs on 14 December 2023, it was announced in January 2024 that Laine had entered the NHL/NHLPA Player Assistance Program, personally citing a need to prioritize his "mental health and well-being."

=== Montreal Canadiens (2024–2026) ===
At the conclusion of the 2023–24 season, reports circulated that Laine was disgruntled with the Blue Jackets and that both parties sought a trade. This was later confirmed by newly hired Columbus general manager Don Waddell who, in an August 2024 interview, stated that Laine "does not want to play for the Blue Jackets." Subsequently, on 19 August 2024, he was traded to the Montreal Canadiens, along with a second-round pick in 2026, for defenceman Jordan Harris. With his habitual jersey number 29 retired by the team in tribute to Hockey Hall of Fame goaltender Ken Dryden, Laine chose instead to wear number 92 as member of the Canadiens.

In a preseason exhibition game against the Toronto Maple Leafs on 28 September, he took a knee-on-knee collision with Leafs forward Cédric Paré and exited the game. Despite initial fears that he might miss significant playing time, it was subsequently announced that Laine would not require surgery, and would be sidelined for two to three months of the 2024–25 season while his knee rehabilitated.

Following a 24-game absence, he made his Canadiens debut on 3 December versus the New York Islanders where he scored the first goal of the game in the second period. After registering goals through three of his first four games with the team, Laine scored his first hat-trick as a member of the Canadiens on 17 December versus the Buffalo Sabres, surpassing fellow countryman Mikko Rantanen for the third most hat-tricks all-time by a Finnish-born NHL player with 11. He was recognized as part of the NHL's weekly Three Star Awards for the period ending on 22 December.

Just 10 games after making his season debut, he would suffer yet another injury, coincidentally in his return to Nationwide Arena versus the Blue Jackets on 23 December. Despite this, Laine did not miss any additional playing time and was present for the Canadiens' next game on 28 December versus the Florida Panthers. Following a four-game absence due to the flu, he returned to the lineup on 11 January 2025 against the Dallas Stars. A few days later, Laine recorded his 400th NHL point on 14 January, scoring his tenth goal of the season and first at even strength against the Utah Hockey Club; all nine of his previous goals had come on the power play. In doing so, he became the seventh Finnish player in NHL history to reach this juncture in fewer than 500 games played, behind Jari Kurri, Teemu Selanne, Rantanen, Sebastian Aho, Esa Tikkanen, and Aleksander Barkov. He would skate in his 500th NHL game on the road at Little Caesars Arena versus the Detroit Red Wings on 23 January.

Five games into the 2025–26 season, Laine suffered a core muscle injury. After missing a week of games, the Canadiens announced that he had undergone surgery for same, subsequently ruling him out for the following three to four months. Despite being medically cleared to return by early January 2026, Laine ultimately remained out of the team's lineup for the remainder of the regular season as well as ensuing 2026 Stanley Cup playoffs.

== International play ==
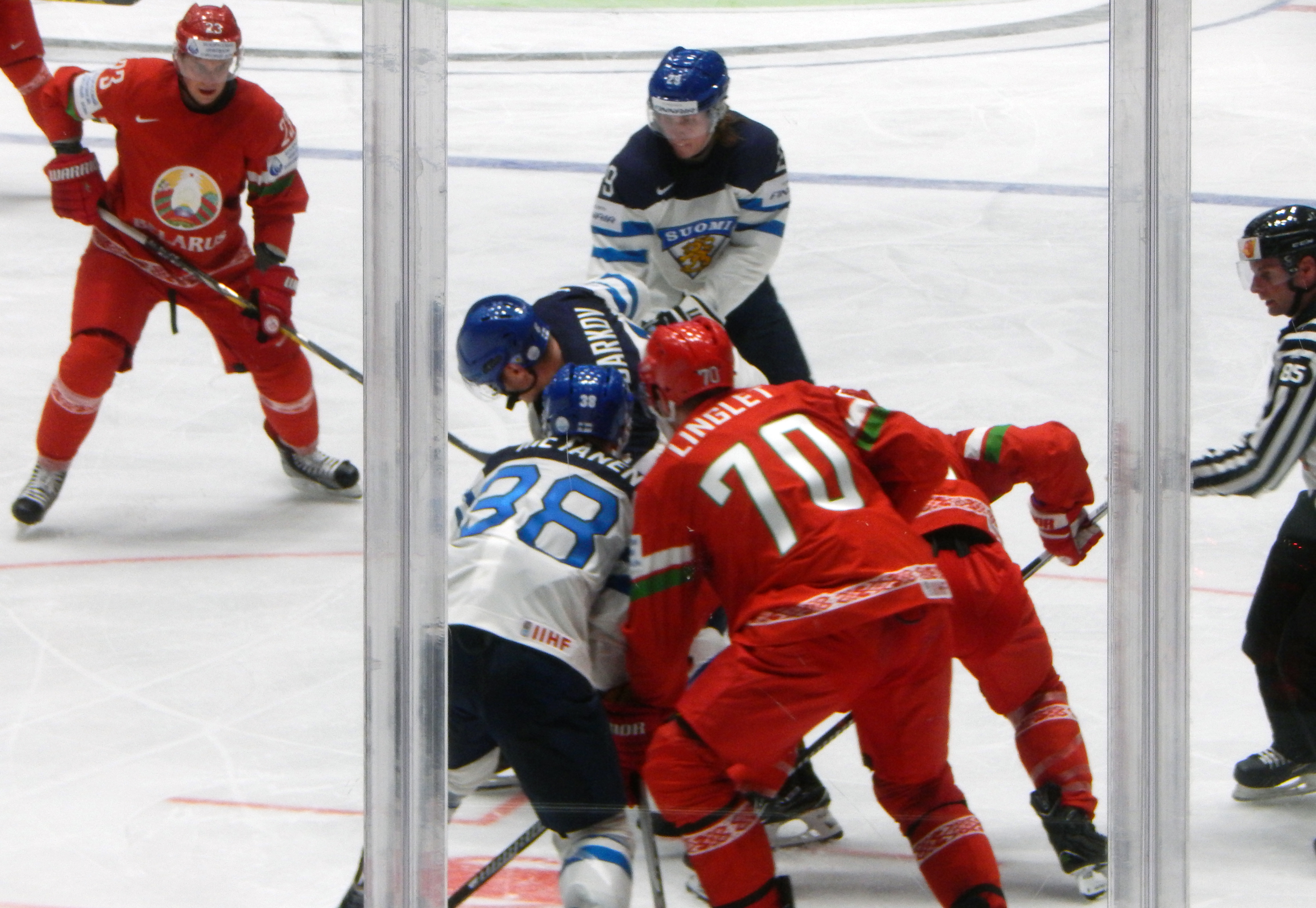
- Laine (number 29) battling for the puck against Belarus at the 2016 IIHF World Championship

Medal record

Representing Finland

Men's ice hockey

IIHF World Championship
Silver medal – second place	2016 Russia	

IIHF World U20 Championship
Gold medal – first place	2016 Finland	

IIHF World U18 Championship
Silver medal – second place	2015 Switzerland	

In April 2015, Laine participated at the International Ice Hockey Federation (IIHF) sanctioned World U18 Championships for his country's national under-18 team. Through seven tournament games, Laine scored eight goals and three assists for 11 points to help lead his team to the gold medal match against the United States and an eventual silver medal finish. For his performance, he was named to the media All-Star Team.

Laine subsequently played for the Finland national junior team at the 2016 World Junior Championships, winning gold on 5 January 2016. Having an immediate scoring impact with linemates Jesse Puljujärvi and Sebastian Aho, he was named to the tournament All-Star Team after registering a total of 13 points across seven games played.

Following his championship run with Tappara, Laine was named to the Finland national team for the 2016 IIHF World Championship, becoming the youngest Finnish player to ever play at the tournament. He debuted against Belarus, scoring two goals and one assist to become the youngest player in the tournament's history to score three points in a game. He followed this with a second consecutive three-point (two-goals, one-assist) effort against Germany, becoming the highest-scoring draft-age player in the tournament's history, surpassing Jaromír Jágr who at the same age registered three goals and two assists for five points in ten games at the 1990 World Ice Hockey Championships. In Finland's final round-robin game against Canada, Laine did not score but was considered by analyst Ray Ferraro among others to have had his best game of the tournament. Laine and Finland subsequently reached the championship final, a rematch against the Canadians, where they were defeated 2–0. Laine finished the tournament with seven goals and five assists for 12 points in 10 games and led the tournament in goals scored. He achieved the second-highest point total by a U19 player at a World Championship tournament, behind only Sidney Crosby's total of 16 points at the 2006 IIHF World Championship. Collectively, Laine was named the tournament's most valuable player, as well as a member of the annual All-Star team, and received the IIHF Directorate Award recognizing the best forward.

On 4 December 2024, Laine was named to the Finnish roster as part of the NHL-sanctioned 4 Nations Face-Off held in the midst of the 2024–25 campaign. He registered three assists across as many games whereas his country ultimately finished in fourth place at the conclusion of round-robin play.

== Personal life ==
Growing up, Laine was a fan of the Washington Capitals, particularly star-forward Alexander Ovechkin. In his spare time, he enjoys playing video games, with Fortnite being a personal favorite.

On 6 February 2018, The Players' Tribune published an article under Laine's byline titled "Winnipeg is Good", however, Laine himself denied any involvement aside from being interviewed.

In August 2024, Laine co-founded an online support group known as "From Us to You". The platform allows users, publicly or anonymously, to share their experiences and advice for improving their mental health.

On 28 June 2025, Laine married Columbusite Jordan Smith at The Breakers luxury resort located in Palm Beach, Florida.

== Career statistics ==
=== Regular season and playoffs ===
			Regular season					Playoffs
Season	Team	League	GP	G	A	Pts	PIM	GP	G	A	Pts	PIM
2012–13	Tappara	FIN U18	27	17	9	26	6	3	2	1	3	0
2013–14	Tappara	FIN U18	5	5	6	11	2	—	—	—	—	—
2013–14	Tappara	FIN U20	40	26	11	37	43	1	0	0	0	0
2014–15	Tappara	FIN U20	6	4	1	5	4	—	—	—	—	—
2014–15	Tappara	Liiga	6	0	1	1	2	—	—	—	—	—
2014–15	LeKi	Mestis	36	5	7	12	14	2	0	0	0	2
2015–16	Tappara	Liiga	46	17	16	33	6	18	10	5	15	6
2016–17	Winnipeg Jets	NHL	73	36	28	64	26	—	—	—	—	—
2017–18	Winnipeg Jets	NHL	82	44	26	70	24	17	5	7	12	4
2018–19	Winnipeg Jets	NHL	82	30	20	50	42	6	3	1	4	0
2019–20	Winnipeg Jets	NHL	68	28	35	63	22	1	0	0	0	0
2020–21	Winnipeg Jets	NHL	1	2	1	3	4	—	—	—	—	—
2020–21	Columbus Blue Jackets	NHL	45	10	11	21	21	—	—	—	—	—
2021–22	Columbus Blue Jackets	NHL	56	26	30	56	24	—	—	—	—	—
2022–23	Columbus Blue Jackets	NHL	55	22	30	52	16	—	—	—	—	—
2023–24	Columbus Blue Jackets	NHL	18	6	3	9	6	—	—	—	—	—
2024–25	Montreal Canadiens	NHL	52	20	13	33	14	2	0	1	1	2
2025–26	Montreal Canadiens	NHL	5	0	1	1	2	—	—	—	—	—
NHL totals			537	224	198	422	201	26	8	9	17	6

=== International ===
Year	Team	Event	Result	GP	G	A	Pts	PIM
2014	Finland	IH18	5th	3	1	0	1	2
2015	Finland	WJC18	2nd place, silver medalist(s)	7	8	3	11	0
2016	Finland	WJC	1st place, gold medalist(s)	7	7	6	13	6
2016	Finland	WC	2nd place, silver medalist(s)	10	7	5	12	4
2016	Finland	WCH	8th	3	0	0	0	0
2025	Finland	4NF	4th	3	0	3	3	0
Junior totals				17	16	9	25	8
Senior totals				16	7	8	15	4

== Awards and honours ==
Award	Year	Ref
International
IIHF World U18 Championship All-Star Team	2015	
IIHF World Junior Championship All-Star Team	2016	
IIHF World Championship All-Star Team	2016	
IIHF World Championship MVP	2016	
IIHF Directorate Award (best forward)	2016	
Liiga
Jarmo Wasama Memorial Trophy	2016	
Jari Kurri Trophy	2016	
Kanada-malja champion	2016	
Finnish Player of the Year	2016	
Finnish Ice Hockey Association
President's Trophy	2017	
NHL
All-Star Game	2017	
Rookie of the Month (February 2017)	2017	
All-Rookie Team	2017	
First Star of the Month (November 2018)	2018	
Third Star of the Month (February 2022)	2022	

Awards and achievements
Preceded by Jack Roslovic	Winnipeg Jets first-round draft pick 2016	Succeeded by Logan Stanley
