= Save percentage =

Statistic in hockey, baseball, and lacrosse

Save percentage (often known by such symbols as SV%, SVS%, SVP, PCT) is a statistic in various goal-scoring sports that track saves as a statistic.

In ice hockey and lacrosse and association football, it is a statistic that represents the percentage of shots on goal a goaltender stops. It is calculated by dividing the number of saves by the total number of shots on goal.

Although the statistic is a percentage, it is often given as a decimal in North America, in the same way as a batting average in baseball. Thus, .933 means a goaltender saved 93.3 percent of all shots they faced. In international ice hockey, such as the IIHF World Championships, a save percentage is expressed as a true percentage, such as 90.5%.

== See also ==
- Goals against average, a statistic that represents the number of goals allowed per game by a goaltender
