= Shot on goal (ice hockey) =

Shot that either results in a goal or is blocked by the goalie

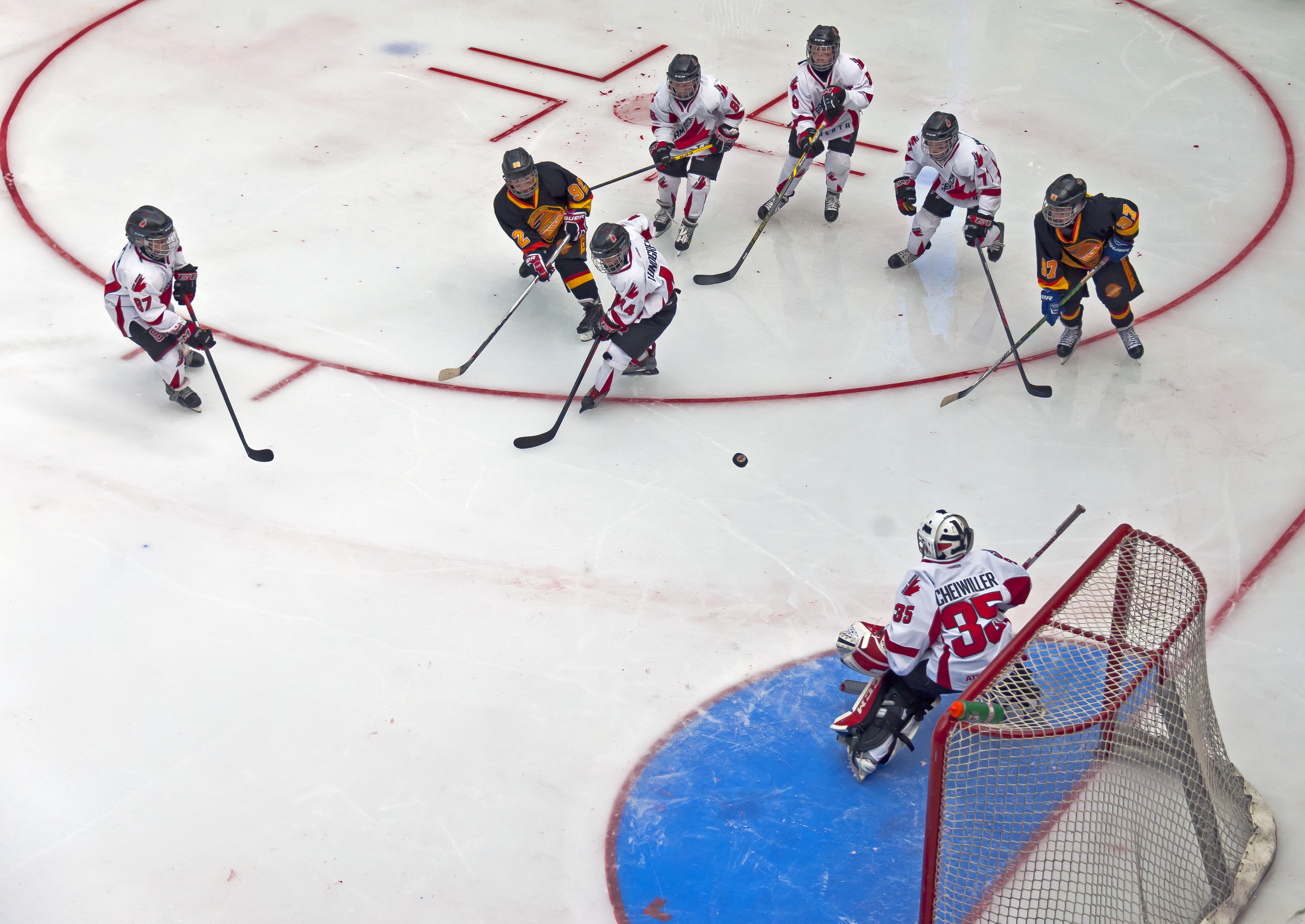
An ultimately successful shot on goal during a youth ice hockey game

In ice hockey, a shot on goal is a shot that directs the puck towards the net and either goes into the net for a goal or is stopped by the goaltender for a save.

A shot that is deflected wide or blocked by an opponent does not count as a shot on goal; it is recorded as a blocked shot. The player who blocks the shot is credited with a 'blocked shot', and the player who shoots the puck is credited with an 'attempt blocked'.

Shots that sail wide or high of the net, and shots that hit the goalpost or crossbar but do not enter the net, are not counted as shots on goal; they are counted as 'missed shots'. Additionally, if a goaltender stops a puck that is going wide or high anyway, it is recorded as a 'shot on goal'. Since it is counted as a shot on goal, the goaltender gets credit for a save.

An attempted shot that hits the pipe framing the goal mouth is not counted as a shot on goal, unless the puck goes into the goal without further contact from the team attempting the shot.

== Shots on net ==
A shot on net is any touch of the puck towards the net, that if not for the goaltender intervening, would result in a goal.

Blocked shots do not count. If someone shoots the puck and it's tipped, only the "tip" counts as a shot, and the original shot becomes a "pass".

If a clearing attempt from the other team ends up on net it should be a shot on goal. If someone swats at a rebound and sends it toward the net it should be a shot on goal. Clearing attempts that end up on net should most definitely count and most scorers will count them.

In the case of a partially blocked shot, or a tipped shot that was on net and is tipped off net, these are not supposed to be counted as shots on goal, as only the "final" touch is a "shot" and the final touch sent those pucks wide.

Wrap arounds and stuff attempts can be an issue. If the goalie's pad blocks a wrap around before he gets around far enough, then the puck would go "across" the crease instead of into the net. Therefore, it shouldn't be regarded as a shot on goal.
