= Full strength =

Full strength (also called 5-on-5) in ice hockey refers to when both teams have five skaters and one goaltender on the ice. The official term used by the National Hockey League (NHL) is at even strength — abbreviated EV on official scoresheets and goaltenders' individual stats. All games start with both teams at full strength. Teams that take a penalty, go on the power play, or pull the goalie are no longer at full strength.

If a team is shorthanded, and its penalties expire, or it is scored on so that its penalized players return, it returns to full strength. Likewise, if a team on a power play scores so that the opposing penalized players all leave the penalty box, the team also returns to full strength.

Full strength is slightly different from "even strength", which means that each team has the same number of skaters on the ice.

Another related reference is that of "equal strength". This is not an official term used by the NHL but is commonly used to describe 'full strength'. The International Ice Hockey Federation uses the abbreviation EQ in its game summaries.
