= 1972 Stanley Cup Final =

1972 ice hockey championship series

	1	2	3	4	5	6	Total
Boston Bruins	6	2	2	3	2	3	4
New York Rangers	5	1	5	2	3	0	2
- Location(s): Boston: Boston Garden (1, 2, 5); New York City: Madison Square Garden (3, 4, 6)
- Coaches: Boston: Tom Johnson; New York: Emile Francis
- Captains: Boston: Vacant; New York: Vic Hadfield
- Dates: April 30 – May 11, 1972
- MVP: Bobby Orr (Bruins)
- Series-winning goal: Bobby Orr (11:18, first)
- Hall of Famers: Bruins: Johnny Bucyk (1981); Gerry Cheevers (1985); Phil Esposito (1984); Bobby Orr (1979); Rangers: Eddie Giacomin (1987); Rod Gilbert (1982); Brad Park (1988); Jean Ratelle (1985); Glen Sather (1997, builder); Coaches: Emile Francis (1982); Tom Johnson (1970, player); Officials: Josh Ashley (1981); Neil Armstrong (1991); John D'Amico (1993); Matt Pavelich (1987)
- Networks: CTV (Canada); CBS (United States) (games 1, 4, and 6)
- Announcers: (CTV): Danny Gallivan and Dick Irvin Jr. (in Boston), Bill Hewitt and Bob Goldham (in New York) (CBS): Dan Kelly, Jim Gordon, and Harry Howell

The 1972 Stanley Cup Final was the championship series of the National Hockey League's (NHL) 1971–72 season, and the culmination of the 1972 Stanley Cup playoffs. It was contested between the Boston Bruins and the New York Rangers. It was the Rangers' first appearance in the finals since 1950. The Bruins were making their first appearance since their victory in the 1970 Finals. It was the second Boston-New York Final series, the other being the 1929 Finals.

The Bruins defeated the Rangers in six games to win their second Stanley Cup in three years. This was only the second Stanley Cup Final contested by New York in which the Rangers hosted all of their home games. The first such Final, held in 1929, had lasted only two games. All other previous Finals contested by the Rangers had partly or entirely coincided with an annual circus formerly held at Madison Square Garden, compelling the Rangers to play Finals games at neutral sites and/or at the venues of their opponents.

This was the last time the Bruins won the Stanley Cup until 2011.

== Paths to the Finals ==
This was the fourth meeting between teams from Boston and New York City for a major professional sports championship. This previously occurred in two World Series (1912, 1916), and the 1929 Stanley Cup Final.

Boston defeated their rival in the Toronto Maple Leafs in five games and swept the St. Louis Blues to advance to the Final.

New York defeated the defending champion Montreal Canadiens in six games and the Chicago Black Hawks in a sweep to set up an "Original Six" Final.

== Game summaries ==
Bobby Orr, who tallied 4 goals and 4 assists in the series, won the Conn Smythe Trophy for the second time. He also scored his second Cup-clinching goal, having first accomplished the feat in the 1970 finals. Phil Esposito had 41 shots in the series but was held without a goal.

=== Game one ===
April 30	New York Rangers	5–6	Boston Bruins	Boston Garden	Recap

Game one in Boston saw both teams play poorly. The Bruins at one point led 5–1 as Ken Hodge completed a hat trick, and Hodge and Derek Sanderson scored short-handed goals on the same Ranger power play at the end of the first period. However, the Rangers tied the game with goals from Gilbert, Hatfield, Tkaczuk, and Bruce MacGregor. With 2:16 remaining in the third period, Garnet "Ace" Bailey beat Rangers star defenseman Brad Park to have the Bruins prevail 6–5.

Gary Doak of the Rangers was ejected from the game after a heated argument with referee Bill Friday over a penalty he received at 18:50 of the first period.

Scoring summary
Period	Team	Goal	Assist(s)	Time	Score
1st	NYR	Dale Rolfe (3)	Rod Gilbert (6) and Brad Park (4)	03:52	1–0 NYR
1st	BOS	Fred Stanfield (7)	Jim McKenzie	05:07	1–1
1st	BOS	Ken Hodge (5)	Phil Esposito (8) and Mike Walton (3)	15:48	2–1 BOS
1st	BOS	Derek Sanderson (1) – sh	Ed Westfall (2)	17:29	3–1 BOS
1st	BOS	Ken Hodge (6) – sh	Phil Esposito (9)	18:14	4–1 BOS
2nd	BOS	Ken Hodge (7)	Phil Esposito (10) and Bobby Orr (16)	10:46	5–1 BOS
2nd	NYR	Rod Gilbert (4) – pp	Vic Hadfield (7) and Jean Ratelle (1)	11:54	5–2 BOS
3rd	NYR	Vic Hadfield (7) – pp	Walt Tkaczuk (5) and Rod Gilbert (7)	01:56	5–3 BOS
3rd	NYR	Walt Tkaczuk (4)	Unassisted	07:48	5–4 BOS
3rd	NYR	Bruce MacGregor (2)	Ted Irvine (2) and Pete Stemkowski (6)	09:17	5–5
3rd	BOS	Garnet Bailey (2)	Mike Walton (4) and Ed Westfall (3)	17:44	6–5 BOS
Penalty summary
Period	Team	Player	Penalty	Time	PIM
1st	BOS	John McKenzie	Elbowing	00:38	2:00
1st	BOS	Wayne Cashman	High-sticking	03:17	2:00
1st	NYR	Ted Irvine	High-sticking	03:17	2:00
1st	NYR	Walt Tkaczuk	Holding	05:24	2:00
1st	BOS	John McKenzie	Roughing	05:49	2:00
1st	NYR	Glen Sather	Roughing	05:49	2:00
1st	BOS	Wayne Cashman	Slashing	09:28	2:00
1st	BOS	Don Awrey	Elbowing	16:44	2:00
1st	NYR	Gary Doak	Elbowing	18:45	2:00
1st	NYR	Gary Doak	Misconduct	18:45	10:00
1st	NYR	Gary Doak	Game misconduct	18:45	10:00
1st	BOS	Phil Esposito	High-sticking	19:30	2:00
1st	NYR	Walt Tkaczuk	High-sticking	19:30	2:00
2nd	BOS	Ken Hodge	Hooking	03:57	2:00
2nd	BOS	Johnny Bucyk	Tripping	08:22	2:00
2nd	BOS	Phil Esposito	Hooking	11:49	2:00
2nd	BOS	Phil Esposito	Elbowing	19:21	2:00
3rd	BOS	Derek Sanderson	Hooking	01:12	2:00
3rd	NYR	Brad Park	Tripping	03:38	2:00

Shots by period
Team	1	2	3	Total
New York	7	11	11	29
Boston	12	7	9	28

=== Game two ===
May 2	New York Rangers	1–2	Boston Bruins	Boston Garden	Recap

Game two had Gilles Villemure replace Eddie Giacomin in goal for the Rangers. He played well, but the Bruins did too and won 2–1. Eddie Johnston also replaced Cheevers in goal for the Bruins.

Scoring summary
Period	Team	Goal	Assist(s)	Time	Score
1st	BOS	Johnny Bucyk (9) – pp	Bobby Orr (17) and Fred Stanfield (8)	16:15	1–1
2nd	NYR	Rod Gilbert (5)	Jim Neilson (3) and Vic Hadfield (8)	07:23	1–1
3rd	BOS	Ken Hodge (8) – pp	Mike Walton (5) and Phil Esposito (11)	11:53	2–1 BOS
Penalty summary
Period	Team	Player	Penalty	Time	PIM
1st	BOS	Don Awrey	Elbowing	01:26	2:00
1st	NYR	Vic Hadfield	Holding	02:07	2:00
1st	BOS	Wayne Cashman	Elbowing	06:03	2:00
1st	BOS	Carol Vadnais	High-sticking	08:42	2:00
1st	NYR	Dale Rolfe	Slashing	11:30	2:00
1st	BOS	Carol Vadnais	Roughing	14:08	2:00
1st	NYR	Glen Sather	Roughing	14:08	2:00
1st	NYR	Gary Doak	High-sticking	15:55	2:00
1st	BOS	Ken Hodge	Slashing	19:14	2:00
2nd	NYR	Pete Stemkowski	Tripping	03:21	2:00
2nd	BOS	Garnet Bailey	Misconduct	11:17	10:00
2nd	BOS	Dallas Smith	Holding	11:17	2:00
2nd	NYR	Brad Park	Hooking	12:18	2:00
3rd	BOS	John McKenzie	Boarding	03:02	2:00
3rd	NYR	Bruce MacGregor	Tripping	09:56	2:00
3rd	NYR	Walt Tkaczuk	Tripping	11:46	2:00
3rd	BOS	Don Awrey	Elbowing	15:25	2:00

Shots by period
Team	1	2	3	Total
New York	12	6	10	28
Boston	11	8	6	25

=== Game three ===
May 4	Boston Bruins	2–5	New York Rangers	Madison Square Garden	Recap

In New York, Giacomin and Cheevers were back in goal for game three as the Rangers won 5–2. Brad Park opened the scoring with a power play goal and scored another in the first period. Rod Gilbert also had two goals in the game.

Scoring summary
Period	Team	Goal	Assist(s)	Time	Score
1st	NYR	Brad Park (3) – pp	Vic Hadfield (9) and Bill Fairbairn (4)	01:22	1–0 NYR
1st	NYR	Rod Gilbert (6) – pp	Brad Park (5) and Bobby Rousseau (10)	11:19	2–0 NYR
1st	NYR	Brad Park (4) – pp	Rod Gilbert (8)	13:00	3–0 NYR
1st	BOS	Mike Walton (6)	Carol Vadnais (2)	14:04	3–1 NYR
2nd	BOS	Bobby Orr (2)	Dallas Smith (9) and Wayne Cashman (7)	01:10	3–2 NYR
2nd	NYR	Rod Gilbert (7)	Bobby Rousseau (11) and Brad Park (6)	03:46	4–2 NYR
2nd	NYR	Pete Stemkowski (4)	Bruce MacGregor (5) and Ted Irvine (3)	19:23	5–2 NYR
3rd	None				
Penalty summary
Period	Team	Player	Penalty	Time	PIM
1st	BOS	Dallas Smith	Hooking	00:12	2:00
1st	NYR	Ted Irvine	Cross-checking	02:09	2:00
1st	NYR	Glen Sather	Roughing	04:39	2:00
1st	NYR	Jim Neilson	Boarding	07:17	2:00
1st	BOS	Garnet Bailey	Hooking	09:35	2:00
1st	BOS	Bobby Orr	High-sticking	12:43	2:00
1st	NYR	Dale Rolfe	Holding	15:20	2:00
1st	BOS	Carol Vadnais	High-sticking	18:15	2:00
2nd	NYR	Rod Gilbert	Interference	04:28	2:00
2nd	NYR	Dale Rolfe	Tripping	09:24	2:00
2nd	BOS	Mike Walton	Tripping	09:49	2:00
2nd	BOS	Ken Hodge	Hooking	12:35	2:00
3rd	NYR	Pete Stemkowski	Slashing	02:17	2:00
3rd	NYR	Ted Irvine	Boarding	07:38	2:00
3rd	BOS	Don Marcotte	High-sticking	10:50	2:00
3rd	NYR	Rod Gilbert	High-sticking	10:50	2:00
3rd	BOS	Derek Sanderson	Slashing	12:00	2:00
3rd	NYR	Rod Seiling	Holding	12:00	2:00
3rd	BOS	Derek Sanderson	Misconduct	19:59	10:00

Shots by period
Team	1	2	3	Total
Boston	14	6	14	34
New York	14	17	8	39

=== Game four ===
May 7	Boston Bruins	3–2	New York Rangers	Madison Square Garden	Recap

Giacomin, facing Johnston in this game, was having trouble with a knee he injured during the Chicago series and lost game four 3–2.

Scoring summary
Period	Team	Goal	Assist(s)	Time	Score
1st	BOS	Bobby Orr (3)	Mike Walton (6)	05:26	1–0 BOS
1st	BOS	Bobby Orr (4) – pp	Jim McKenzie (12) and Johnny Bucyk (10)	08:17	2–0 BOS
2nd	BOS	Don Marcotte (3) – sh	Bobby Orr (18)	16:33	3–0 BOS
2nd	NYR	Ted Irvine (4)	Pete Stemkowski (7) and Ric Seiling (4)	18:38	3–1 BOS
3rd	NYR	Rod Seiling (1) – pp	Ted Irvine (4) and Pete Stemkowski (8)	18:35	3–2 NYR
Penalty summary
Period	Team	Player	Penalty	Time	PIM
1st	BOS	Phil Esposito	High-sticking	01:24	2:00
1st	BOS	Derek Sanderson	Fighting – major	01:39	5:00
1st	NYR	Bobby Rousseau	Fighting – major	01:39	5:00
1st	BOS	Don Marcotte	High-sticking	03:20	2:00
1st	BOS	Ed Westfall	Misconduct	03:20	10:00
1st	NYR	Gary Doak	Interference	03:20	2:00
1st	BOS	Don Awrey	Fighting – major	07:21	5:00
1st	NYR	Gene Carr	High-sticking	07:21	2:00
1st	NYR	Gene Carr	Fighting – major	07:21	5:00
1st	BOS	Phil Esposito	Holding	09:45	2:00
1st	NYR	Ted Irvine	Charging	09:45	2:00
1st	BOS	Mike Walton	Slashing	11:44	2:00
1st	BOS	John McKenzie	Fighting – major	16:15	5:00
1st	BOS	John McKenzie	Misconduct	16:15	10:00
1st	BOS	Bobby Orr	Fighting – major	16:15	5:00
1st	NYR	Brad Park	Fighting – major	16:15	5:00
1st	NYR	Glen Sather	Fighting – major	16:15	5:00
1st	BOS	Dallas Smith	Hooking	18:28	2:00
2nd	BOS	Ken Hodge	Hooking	00:22	2:00
2nd	BOS	Garnet Bailey	Elbowing	05:32	2:00
2nd	BOS	Carol Vadnais	Fighting – major	05:32	5:00
2nd	NYR	Vic Hadfield	Fighting – major	05:32	5:00
2nd	NYR	Pete Stemkowski	Tripping	06:10	2:00
2nd	NYR	Gary Doak	Holding	08:15	2:00
2nd	BOS	Mike Walton	High-sticking	15:33	2:00
2nd	BOS	Don Awrey	Tripping	19:09	2:00
3rd	NYR	Pete Stemkowski	Tripping	09:01	2:00
3rd	BOS	Don Awrey	Hooking	15:02	2:00
3rd	BOS	Ken Hodge	Tripping	17:18	2:00

Shots by period
Team	1	2	3	Total
Boston	5	10	9	24
New York	6	11	6	23

=== Game five ===
May 9	New York Rangers	3–2	Boston Bruins	Boston Garden	Recap

Game five in Boston had Villemure again replace Giacomin, while Johnston remained in goal for the Bruins. Boston led 2–1 after two periods. However, Bobby Rousseau scored twice in the third period, his second at 12:45 turned out to be the winner in a 3–2 win for the Rangers.

Scoring summary
Period	Team	Goal	Assist(s)	Time	Score
1st	BOS	Wayne Cashman (2)	Ken Hodge (6) and Phil Esposito (12)	03:55	1–0 BOS
1st	NYR	Dale Rolfe (4)	Walt Tkaczuk (6) and Bill Fairbairn (7)	13:45	1–1
1st	BOS	Ken Hodge (9) – pp	Fred Stanfield (9) and Phil Esposito (13)	16:07	2–1 BOS
2nd	None				
3rd	NYR	Bobby Rousseau (5)	Brad Park (7) and Bruce MacGregor (6)	02:56	2–2
3rd	NYR	Bobby Rousseau (6)	Ted Irvine (5)	12:45	3–2 NYR
Penalty summary
Period	Team	Player	Penalty	Time	PIM
1st	BOS	John McKenzie	Elbowing	00:50	2:00
1st	BOS	Don Awrey	Charging	04:28	2:00
1st	BOS	Don Awrey	Elbowing	04:28	2:00
1st	BOS	Walt Tkaczuk	Tripping	09:51	2:00
1st	NYR	Dale Rolfe	Interference	14:14	2:00
1st	NYR	Rod Gilbert	Hooking	18:00	2:00
2nd	NYR	Brad Park	Elbowing	00:29	2:00
2nd	BOS	Phil Esposito	High-sticking	06:36	2:00
2nd	BOS	Dallas Smith	Holding	06:36	2:00
2nd	NYR	Rod Seiling	High-sticking	06:36	2:00
2nd	BOS	Don Awrey	Slashing	15:08	2:00
2nd	NYR	Gary Doak	Slashing	16:23	2:00
2nd	NYR	Walt Tkaczuk	Hooking	16:48	2:00
3rd	NYR	Rod Seiling	Holding	04:07	2:00
3rd	BOS	Phil Esposito	Hooking	05:07	2:00

Shots by period
Team	1	2	3	Total
New York	7	9	10	26
Boston	12	9	17	38

=== Game six ===
May 11	Boston Bruins	0–3	New York Rangers	Madison Square Garden	Recap

Game six in New York saw Boston play flawlessly and Gerry Cheevers made 33 saves to record his second shutout of the postseason in a 3–0 victory. Bobby Orr's first-period marker ended up standing as the Stanley Cup-winning goal, and he also assisted on the Bruins' second goal. Orr spent 10 minutes in the penalty box after arguing with referee Art Skov but upon his return on the ice played a crucial role in killing off a penalty to the Bruins. Wayne Cashman scored two goals, one of which trickled in behind Gilles Villemure.

Scoring summary
Period	Team	Goal	Assist(s)	Time	Score
1st	BOS	Bobby Orr (5) – pp	Ken Hodge (7) and Johnny Bucyk (11)	11:18	1–0 BOS
2nd	None				
3rd	BOS	Wayne Cashman (3) – pp	Phil Esposito (14) and Bobby Orr (19)	05:10	2–0 BOS
3rd	BOS	Wayne Cashman (4)	Ken Hodge (8) and Phil Esposito (15)	18:11	3–0 BOS
Penalty summary
Period	Team	Player	Penalty	Time	PIM
1st	BOS	John McKenzie	Slashing	02:32	2:00
1st	NYR	Ted Irvine	Slashing	05:44	2:00
1st	BOS	Ken Hodge	Trippiing	07:07	2:00
1st	NYR	Walt Tkaczuk	Hooking	10:25	2:00
1st	BOS	Ken Hodge	High-sticking	13:06	2:00
1st	BOS	Ken Hodge	Fighting – major	13:06	5:00
1st	NYR	Vic Hadfield	High-sticking	13:06	2:00
1st	NYR	Vic Hadfield	Fighting – major	13:06	5:00
1st	BOS	Wayne Cashman	Charging	14:46	2:00
1st	BOS	Bobby Orr	Misconduct	14:46	10:00
1st	NYR	Gary Doak	High-sticking	14:46	2:00
2nd	BOS	Carol Vadnais	Holding	03:45	2:00
2nd	NYR	Vic Hadfield	Roughing	03:45	2:00
2nd	BOS	Don Marcotte	Boarding	04:33	2:00
2nd	BOS	Derek Sanderson	Kneeing	04:33	2:00
2nd	BOS	Derek Sanderson	Fighting – major	04:33	5:00
2nd	NYR	Rod Gilbert	Fighting – major	04:33	5:00
2nd	NYR	Gene Carr	Tripping	09:16	2:00
2nd	BOS	Wayne Cashman	High-sticking	12:05	2:00
2nd	NYR	Gary Doak	High-sticking	12:05	2:00
2nd	BOS	Wayne Cashman	Fighting – major	16:01	5:00
2nd	NYR	Walt Tkaczuk	Fighting – major	16:01	5:00
3rd	NYR	Dale Rolfe	Holding	03:20	2:00
3rd	BOS	Dallas Smith	Tripping	10:36	2:00

Shots by period
Team	1	2	3	Total
Boston	8	9	10	27
New York	9	11	13	33

As of 2025, the 1972 Bruins are the most recent team to have won the Cup without a formal captain. Johnny Bucyk, as the team's senior alternate captain, accepted the Cup and circled the rink in the ceremonial skate.

== Broadcasting ==
Hockey Night in Canada moved all playoff coverage from CBC to CTV (in actuality, MacLaren Advertising, the actual rights holders of HNIC at the time, worked out arrangements with CTV to move the full NHL playoffs there) to avoid conflict with the lengthy NABET strike against the CBC.

In the United States, CBS took a rather calculated risk in not televising the game five match on May 9 (CBS aired regular programming, including the original Hawaii Five-O in that time period on that Tuesday night). This was despite the fact that game five was a potential clincher with the Bruins up three games to one on the Rangers. CBS ultimately lucked out (since the Rangers won game five 3-2), and televised the clincher (game six) on Thursday night, May 11.

== Stanley Cup engraving ==
The following Bruins players and staff had their names engraved on the Stanley Cup:

1971–72 Boston Bruins

=== Players ===
Centres

- 7 Phil Esposito (A)
- 11 Mike Walton
- 17 Fred Stanfield
- 16 Derek Sanderson

Wingers

- 8 Ken Hodge
- 9 John Bucyk (A)
- 12 Wayne Cashman
- 14 Ace Bailey
- 18 Ed Westfall (A)
- 19 John McKenzie
- 21 Don Marcotte

Defencemen

- 4 Bobby Orr
- 6 Ted Green (A)
- 10 Carol Vadnais
- 20 Dallas Smith
- 26 Don Awrey

Goaltenders

- 1 Eddie Johnston
- 30 Gerry Cheevers

=== Coaching and administrative staff ===
- Weston Adams Sr. (Chairman/Owner), Weston Adams, Jr. (President/Owner)
- Shelby Davis (Vice President)
- Charles Mulcahy Jr. (Vice President – General Council)
- Ed Powers (Vice President – Treasurer),
- Milt Schmidt (General Manager), Tom Johnson (Head Coach)
- Dan Canney (Trainer), John Forristall (Asst. Trainer)

=== Stanley Cup engraving ===
- The Boston Bruins' name was misspelled as BQSTQN BRUINS with two "Q"s instead of "O"s. This error was corrected on the replica Cup created in 1992–93.
- Every person whose name was engraved won the Stanley Cup as a member of the Bruins in 1972 had already appeared on the Stanley Cup. This had previously occurred only once, in 1960, and has not occurred again since.
- Garry Peters dressed for 2 games 1 & 2 of Stanley Cup Semi-Finals, playing game 1. Chris Hayes then played in game 3 of the Semi-Finals (his only NHL game). By the rules of the time, this qualified both to have their names engraved on the Stanley Cup, but neither was included. Peters also won the cup with Montreal in 1965.
- As with the 1970 team, the Boston Bruins did not have a team captain. John Bucyk, Phil Esposito, Ted Green and Ed Westfall all served as alternate captains (all but Green held the title in 1970 as well).

== See also ==
- 1971–72 Boston Bruins season
- 1971–72 NHL season
- 1971–72 New York Rangers season

== Notes ==
Preceded by Montreal Canadiens; 1971	Boston Bruins; Stanley Cup champions 1972	Succeeded by Montreal Canadiens; 1973
