= Boston Garden-Arena Corporation =

- Founded: 1934
- Defunct: 1973
- Fate: Merged with Storer Broadcasting
- Key people: Walter A. Brown, President and General Manager; Weston Adams, Chairman; Weston Adams Jr., President

The Boston Garden-Arena Corporation was an American corporation that oversaw the operations of the Boston Garden from 1934 to 1973. It was formed when the Boston Arena Corporation gained control of the Boston Garden from the Madison Square Garden Corporation in 1934. From 1946 to 1950 it owned the Boston Celtics. In 1951 it purchased controlling interest in the Boston Bruins from Weston Adams. In 1953 it sold the Boston Arena to Samuel M. Pinsly for $398,000. In 1973, the Boston Garden-Arena Corporation merged with Storer Broadcasting.

== Members ==
=== Presidents ===
- Henry G. Lapham (1934–1939 )
- Raymond Lapham (1940–1941)
- Walter A. Brown (1941–1942)
- Tom Kanaly (1942–1945)
- Walter A. Brown (1945–1964)
- Edward J. Powers (1964 –1973)
- Weston Adams Jr. (1973)

=== General Managers ===
- George V. Brown (1934–1937)
- Walter A. Brown (1937–1942)
- Tom Kanaly Acting (1942–1945)
- Walter A. Brown (1945–1964)
- Edward J. Powers (1964–1973 )

=== Chairmen ===
- Weston Adams (1951–1973)

=== Notable directors ===
- Earl Blaik
- Marjorie Brown
- Shelby Davis
- Frederic C. Dumaine Jr.
- Sheldon Fairbanks
- John S. Hammond
- Huntington Hardwick
- Louis K. Liggett
- John R. Macomber
- Walter E. O'Hara
- Bayard Tuckerman Jr.
- Herbert Tuckerman
- Laurence F. Whittemore

Preceded by First	Boston Celtics principal owner 1946–1950	Succeeded by Walter A. Brown
Preceded by Weston Adams	Boston Bruins principal owner 1951–1973	Succeeded by Storer Broadcasting
