= Tom Kanaly =

American sports executive

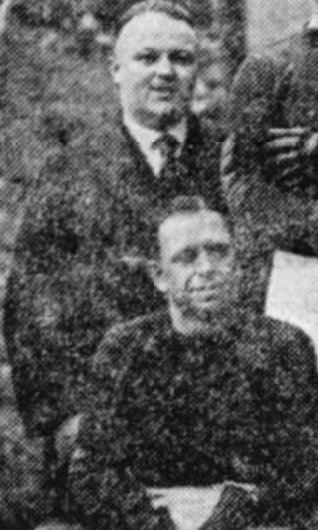
- Kanaly (standing) in the 1920–21 Boston Athletic Association hockey team photo
- Born: Thomas J. Kanaly; Glastonbury, Connecticut, U.S.
- Died: February 15, 1953 (aged 62); Melrose, Massachusetts, U.S.
- Occupation: Former Boston Athletic Association and Boston Garden-Arena Corporation executive
- Years active: 1911–1951
- Spouse: Elizabeth G. Guiney
- Children: 2

Thomas J. Kanaly (born c. 1890 – February 15, 1953) was an American sports executive with the Boston Athletic Association and the Boston Garden-Arena Corporation.

== Personal life ==
Kanaly was born in Glastonbury, Connecticut, but grew up in Lawrence, Massachusetts after his father, a woolen mill executive, got a job there. He graduated from a business college in Boston and lived in Malden, Massachusetts, until 1925, when he moved to Melrose, Massachusetts. Kanaly and his wife had two children.

== Boston Athletic Association ==
Kanaly joined the Boston Athletic Association in 1911 as an assistant to George V. Brown. When Brown took over management of the Boston Arena in 1921, Kanaly succeeded him as athletic director of the B.A.A.. He held this position until 1935, when the club shut down. When the club reopened, Kanaly served as its secretary, a position he held until he suffered a cerebral hemorrhage in 1951. Kanaly was in charge of the Boston Marathon from 1942 to 1945 while B.A.A. president Walter A. Brown was in the service.

== Boston Garden-Arena Corporation ==
On October 27, 1942, Boston Garden-Arena Corporation general manager Walter A. Brown was granted an indefinite leave of absence while he went on active military duty and Kanaly, Brown's assistant, was named acting general manager. On January 30, 1945, Kanaly canceled a basketball game between Brooklyn College and the University of Akron after Kings County prosecutors announced that five Brooklyn players had admitted to accepting money to throw the game. After Brown returned from the military, Kanaly stayed on as assistant to the president.

== Amateur Athletic Union ==
In 1921, Kanaly was elected to the board of managers of the New England Amateur Athletic Union. He served as the NEAAU's vice president until 1943, when he succeeded Herbert Holm as president after Holm stepped down to become secretary-treasurer. Kanaly managed the AAU's national boxing championships from 1921 until 1930, when the AAU moved the championships out of Boston.

== Olympics ==
In 1924, Kanaly was in charge of the United States Olympic Committee's attaché office in Paris. In 1932 he was a member of the housing committee for the Los Angeles Olympics.

== Other activities ==
In 1936, Kanaly was the executive secretary of the Boston Globe's Golden Gloves tournament. He was also the secretary of the Canadian–American Hockey League.

== Death ==
Kanaly died on February 15, 1953, at his home in Melrose.
