= 1970 Stanley Cup Final =

1970 ice hockey championship series

- Bobby Orr of the Bruins airborne after scoring the Cup-winning goal in overtime of game four; behind him is Noel Picard of the Blues
	1	2	3	4	Total
St. Louis Blues	1	2	1	3*	0
Boston Bruins	6	6	4	4*	4
- * – Denotes overtime period(s)
- Location(s): St. Louis: St. Louis Arena (1, 2); Boston: Boston Garden (3, 4)
- Coaches: St. Louis: Scotty Bowman; Boston: Harry Sinden
- Captains: St. Louis: Al Arbour; Boston: Vacant
- Dates: May 3–10, 1970
- MVP: Bobby Orr (Bruins)
- Series-winning goal: Bobby Orr (0:40, OT)
- Hall of Famers: Bruins: Johnny Bucyk (1981); Gerry Cheevers (1985); Phil Esposito (1984); Bobby Orr (1979); Blues: Al Arbour (1996, builder); Glenn Hall (1975); Jacques Plante (1978); Coaches: Scotty Bowman (1991); Harry Sinden (1983); Officials: Josh Ashley (1981); Neil Armstrong (1991); Matt Pavelich (1987)
- Networks: CBC (Canada); SRC (Canada, French); CBS (United States) (Games 1 and 4); WSBK (Boston; Games 2 and 3); KPLR (St.Louis; Games 2 and 3)
- Announcers: (CBC): Bill Hewitt, Bob Goldham and Brian McFarlane (in St. Louis) Danny Gallivan and Dick Irvin Jr. (in Boston) (SRC): Rene Lecavalier and Gilles Tremblay (CBS): Dan Kelly, Bill Mazer and Gordie Howe (WSBK):Don Earle and Johnny Peirson (KPLR): Dan Kelly and Gus Kyle

The 1970 Stanley Cup Final was the championship series of the National Hockey League's (NHL) 1969–70 season, and the culmination of the 1970 Stanley Cup playoffs. It was a contest between the Boston Bruins and the St. Louis Blues, who appeared in their third consecutive finals series. The Bruins were making their first appearance in the Stanley Cup Final since 1958.

The Bruins swept the Blues to win their first Stanley Cup title since 1941. The Blues, who had gone to the Finals their first three years in the league, would eventually lose each of the three series in four-game sweeps. St. Louis would not appear in a Stanley Cup Final again until 2019, where they also faced (and defeated) the Bruins in seven games, ending the second-longest Finals drought in league history.

== Paths to the Finals ==
Boston defeated the New York Rangers 4–2 and the Chicago Black Hawks 4–0 to advance to the Finals.

St. Louis defeated the Minnesota North Stars 4–2 and the Pittsburgh Penguins 4–2.

This was the seventh meeting between teams from Boston and St. Louis for a major professional sports championship. This previously happened in two World Series (1946, 1967), and four NBA Finals (1957, 1958, 1960, 1961).

== Game summaries ==
The Boston Bruins tied for first in the East Division with the Chicago Black Hawks with 99 points. The Bruins lost the tiebreaker of wins with 40 to Chicago's 45. The St. Louis Blues finished first in the West Division with 86 points. This was the first playoff meeting between these two teams. In this year's regular-season series, there were three wins for Boston, one for St. Louis and two ties.

=== Game one ===
May 3	Boston Bruins	6–1	St. Louis Blues	St. Louis Arena	Recap

Three minutes and fifty-seven seconds into the second period of game one, a hard shot from Boston forward Fred Stanfield was deflected and struck St. Louis goaltender Jacques Plante in the forehead of his face mask, splitting the mask in half and knocking Plante unconscious. The first thing Plante said after he regained consciousness at the hospital was that the mask saved his life. Plante would not return for remainder of the series. Doctors later said if Plante hadn't been wearing a mask, he surely would have been killed. Ernie Wakely took over in goal but only held off the Bruins for a few minutes before becoming a rather easy mark for Bruins sharpshooters, with Johnny Bucyk recording a hat trick, and the Bruins winning the game by a score of 6–1.

Scoring summary
Period	Team	Goal	Assist(s)	Time	Score
1st	BOS	Johnny Bucyk (6)	Fred Stanfield (10)	19:45	1–0 BOS
2nd	STL	Jim Roberts (2)	Bill McCreary (7)	01:52	1–1
2nd	BOS	Johnny Bucyk (7)	John McKenzie (9) and Phil Esposito (9)	05:16	2–1 BOS
3rd	BOS	Wayne Carleton (2)	Derek Sanderson (2) and Don Awrey (5)	04:59	3–1 BOS
3rd	BOS	Johnny Bucyk (8)	Rick Smith (1) and John McKenzie (10)	05:31	4–1 BOS
3rd	BOS	Derek Sanderson (3) – pp	Bobby Orr (8)	17:20	5–1 BOS
3rd	BOS	Phil Esposito (12)	Unassisted	18:58	6–1 BOS
Penalty summary
Period	Team	Player	Penalty	Time	PIM
1st	STL	Jim Roberts	High-sticking	01:09	2:00
1st	BOS	Derek Sanderson	Hooking	03:15	2:00
1st	BOS	Bobby Orr	Holding	06:54	2:00
1st	BOS	Gerry Cheevers	Slashing	09:06	2:00
1st	BOS	Wayne Cashman	High-sticking	11:26	2:00
1st	STL	Noel Picard	High-sticking	11:26	2:00
2nd	STL	Tim Ecclestone	Hooking	02:39	2:00
2nd	BOS	John McKenzie	Holding	09:59	2:00
2nd	BOS	Wayne Cashman	Fighting – major	12:52	5:00
2nd	STL	Noel Picard	Fighting – major	12:52	5:00
2nd	BOS	Dallas Smith	High-sticking	17:05	2:00
2nd	BOS	Phil Esposito	Elbowing	18:25	2:00
2nd	STL	Phil Goyette	Hooking	18:54	2:00
3rd	STL	Noel Picard	Holding	11:11	2:00
3rd	BOS	Don Awrey	Holding	16:52	2:00

Shots by period
Team	1	2	3	Total
Boston	9	13	13	35
St. Louis	11	11	7	29

=== Game two ===
May 5	Boston Bruins	6–2	St. Louis Blues	St. Louis Arena	Recap

In game two, Ed Westfall and Derek Sanderson each scored twice for the Bruins in a 6–2 victory for Boston.

Scoring summary
Period	Team	Goal	Assist(s)	Time	Score
1st	BOS	Fred Stanfield (4) – pp	Bobby Orr (9) and Phil Esposito (10)	08:10	1–0 BOS
1st	BOS	Ed Westfall (2)	Rick Smith (2)	13:38	2–0 BOS
1st	BOS	Ed Westfall (3) – sh	Bobby Orr (10)	19:15	3–0 BOS
2nd	BOS	Derek Sanderson (4) – pp	Phil Esposito (11) and Wayne Carleton (4)	09:37	4–0 BOS
2nd	STL	Terry Gray (2) – pp	Noel Picard (2)	17:26	4–1 BOS
3rd	BOS	Derek Sanderson (5)	Dallas Smith (3) and Ed Westfall (5)	00:58	5–1 BOS
3rd	STL	Frank St. Marseille (5)	Phil Goyette (10) and Ab McDonald (10)	04:15	5–2 BOS
3rd	BOS	Johnny Bucyk (9)	John McKenzie (11)	15:00	6–2 BOS
Penalty summary
Period	Team	Player	Penalty	Time	PIM
1st	STL	Tim Ecclestone	Holding	02:00	2:00
1st	STL	Noel Picard	Holding	07:20	2:00
1st	BOS	John McKenzie	Charging	11:25	2:00
1st	BOS	Dallas Smith	Hooking	14:13	2:00
1st	BOS	Bench (served by Bill Lesuk)	Too many men on the ice	18:46	2:00
2nd	BOS	Don Awrey	Roughing	05:34	2:00
2nd	STL	Bob Plager	Roughing	05:34	2:00
2nd	STL	Bob Plager	Tripping	09:12	2:00
2nd	BOS	Derek Sanderson	Elbowing	15:31	2:00
2nd	STL	Noel Picard	Holding	18:15	2:00
3rd	BOS	John McKenzie	Charging	04:10	2:00
3rd	BOS	Bobby Orr	Holding	11:42	2:00
3rd	BOS	Gary Doak	Delay of game (smothering puck)	17:12	2:00

Shots by period
Team	1	2	3	Total
Boston	16	11	8	35
St. Louis	5	6	8	19

=== Game three ===
May 7	St. Louis Blues	1–4	Boston Bruins	Boston Garden	Recap

In game three, Wayne Cashman scored twice, Phil Esposito recorded three assists, and Boston defeated St. Louis 4–1 to take a 3–0 lead in the series.

Scoring summary
Period	Team	Goal	Assist(s)	Time	Score
1st	STL	Frank St. Marseille (6) – pp	Unassisted	08:10	1–0 STL
1st	BOS	Johnny Bucyk (10) – pp	Phil Esposito (12) and Fred Stanfield (11)	13:23	1–1
1st	BOS	John McKenzie (5)	Bobby Orr (11) and Fred Stanfield (12)	18:23	2–1 BOS
2nd	None				
3rd	BOS	Wayne Cashman (4)	Ken Hodge (8) and Phil Esposito (13)	03:26	3–1 BOS
3rd	BOS	Wayne Cashman (5)	Ken Hodge (9) and Phil Esposito (1)	14:26	4–1 BOS
Penalty summary
Period	Team	Player	Penalty	Time	PIM
1st	BOS	Don Awrey	Boarding	05:11	2:00
1st	BOS	John McKenzie	Elbowing	08:20	2:00
1st	BOS	Wayne Cashman	Roughing	11:44	2:00
1st	STL	Red Berenson	Roughing	11:44	2:00
1st	STL	Jim Roberts	Hooking	11:44	2:00
2nd	STL	Ron Anderson	Tripping	02:36	2:00
2nd	BOS	Don Awrey	Holding	05:52	2:00
2nd	STL	Frank St. Marseille	Hooking	08:05	2:00
2nd	BOS	Wayne Cashman	Roughing	10:31	2:00
2nd	BOS	Ken Hodge	Roughing	10:31	2:00
2nd	STL	Norm Dennis	Roughing	10:31	2:00
2nd	STL	Ray Fortin	Roughing	10:31	2:00
2nd	BOS	Rick Smith	Hooking	13:42	2:00
3rd	BOS	Don Awrey	Holding	05:10	2:00

Shots by period
Team	1	2	3	Total
St. Louis	10	5	6	21
Boston	10	17	19	46

=== Game four ===
May 10	St. Louis Blues	3–4	OT	Boston Bruins	Boston Garden	Recap

Bobby Orr scored the game-winning goal on Mother's Day in game four against goaltender Glenn Hall, with an assist from close friend and teammate Derek Sanderson, just forty seconds into overtime. The subsequent image of Orr flying through the air, his arms stretched out in victory — (he had been tripped by Blues' defenseman Noel Picard immediately after scoring the goal) — is considered the most famous and recognized hockey image of all time. With the win, the Bruins completed the sweep and became the first American team to win the Stanley Cup since the Chicago Black Hawks in 1961, and Orr was awarded the Conn Smythe Trophy as playoffs MVP.

Scoring summary
Period	Team	Goal	Assist(s)	Time	Score
1st	BOS	Rick Smith (1)	Derek Sanderson (3)	05:28	1–0 BOS
1st	STL	Red Berenson (7)	Bob Plager (3) and Tim Ecclestone (4)	19:17	1–1
2nd	STL	Gary Sabourin (5)	Frank St. Marseille (7)	03:22	2–1 STL
2nd	BOS	Phil Esposito (13)	Ken Hodge (10)	14:22	2–2
3rd	STL	Larry Keenan (7) – pp	Phil Goyette (11) and Jim Roberts (3)	03:22	3–2 STL
3rd	BOS	Johnny Bucyk (11)	John McKenzie (12) and Rick Smith (3)	13:28	3–3
OT	BOS	Bobby Orr (9)	Derek Sanderson (4)	00:40	4–3 BOS
Penalty summary
Period	Team	Player	Penalty	Time	PIM
1st	BOS	Derek Sanderson	Butt-ending	02:36	2:00
1st	BOS	John McKenzie	Roughing	04:41	2:00
1st	BOS	Bobby Orr	Roughing	04:41	2:00
1st	STL	Tim Ecclestone	Roughing	04:41	2:00
1st	STL	Ray Fortin	Roughing	04:41	2:00
1st	STL	Noel Picard	Roughing	04:41	2:00
1st	BOS	John McKenzie	Slashing	07:13	2:00
1st	STL	Noel Picard	Interference	08:07	2:00
1st	BOS	Fred Stanfield	High-sticking	12:58	2:00
1st	BOS	Don Awrey	Charging	16:04	2:00
1st	BOS	Fred Stanfield	Roughing	18:36	2:00
1st	STL	Andre Boudrias	Roughing	18:36	2:00
2nd	BOS	Derek Sanderson	Elbowing	04:21	2:00
2nd	STL	Red Berenson	Hooking	06:32	2:00
2nd	BOS	John McKenzie	Slashing	11:55	2:00
2nd	BOS	Dallas Smith	Interference	18:52	2:00
3rd	BOS	Phil Esposito	Roughing	06:15	2:00
3rd	STL	Ray Fortin	Holding	06:15	2:00
3rd	STL	Bob Plager	Tripping	08:25	2:00
OT	None				

Shots by period
Team	1	2	3	OT	Total
St. Louis	14	7	10	0	31
Boston	10	8	13	1	32

== Quotes ==
Bobby Orr… behind the net to Sanderson to ORR! BOBBY ORR!… scores and the Boston Bruins have won the Stanley Cup!

— Dan Kelly calling Orr's Stanley Cup winning goal

== "The Flight" ==
The most commonly seen video clip of Bobby Orr's famous overtime goal ("The Flight") in game four is the American version broadcast on CBS as called by Dan Kelly. This archival clip can be considered a rarity, since surviving kinescopes or videotapes of the telecasts of hockey games from this era usually emanate from CBC's coverage. According to Dick Irvin Jr.'s book My 26 Stanley Cups (Irvin was in the CBC booth with Danny Gallivan during the 1970 Stanley Cup Final), he was always curious why even the CBC typically uses the CBS replay of the Bobby Orr goal (with Dan Kelly's commentary) instead of Gallivan's call. The explanation that Irvin received was that the CBC's master tape of the game (along with others) was thrown away in order to clear shelf space at the network.

The New England Sports Network has played the CBS video of the goal but has used the original WBZ-FM radio call with Fred Cusick and Johnny Peirson.

== Stanley Cup engraving ==
The 1970 Stanley Cup was presented to Bruins alternate captain Johnny Bucyk by NHL President Clarence Campbell following the Bruins 4–3 overtime win over the Blues in game four.

The following Bruins players and staff had their names engraved on the Stanley Cup

1969–70 Boston Bruins

=== Players ===
Centres

- 7 Phil Esposito (A)
- 16 Derek Sanderson
- 17 Fred Stanfield
- 22 Jim Lorentz
- 22 Ivan Boldirev †

Wingers

- 8 Ken Hodge Sr.
- 9 John Bucyk (A)
- 11 Wayne Carleton
- 12 Wayne Cashman
- 14 Garnet "Ace" Bailey
- 18 Ed Westfall (A)
- 19 John McKenzie
- 21 Don Marcotte
- 23 Dan Schock
- 24 Bill Lesuk
- 28 Ron Murphy †

Defencemen

- 4 Bobby Orr
- 6 Edward Ted Green*
- 10 Rick Smith
- 20 Dallas Smith
- 24 Bill Speer
- 25 Gary Doak
- 26 Don Awrey

Goaltenders

- 1 Eddie Johnston
- 30 Gerry Cheevers
- 31 John Adams †
- * Did not play, missed the whole season due to an injury.
- † Spare who did not play for the team.^{[A]}

=== Coaching and administrative staff ===
- Weston Adams Sr. (Chairman/owner), Weston Adams, Jr. (President/owner)
- Charles Mulcahy Jr. (Vice President – General Counsel), Ed Powers (Vice President – Treasurer), Shelby Davis (Vice President)
- Harry Sinden (Head Coach), Milt Schmidt (General Manager)
- Tom Johnson (Asst. General Manager), Dan Canney (Trainer)
- John Forristall (Asst. Trainer)

=== Engraving notes ===
- Tom Johnson's name was engraved T. Johnson TR by mistake. Johnson was the assistant manager, not the trainer. The mistake was not corrected on the Replica Stanley Cup created in 1992–93.
- Coach, Manager, Asst. Manager and both trainers were listed after the players. Traditional Coach, Manager and Asst. Manager are listed before the players with the rest of the team executives.
- ^{^A} #6 Ted Green (D) received a head injury in a pre-season game. He missed the entire season, but his name was still engraved on the Stanley Cup. #31 John Adams (G) and #22 Ivan Boldirev (C) had their names engraved on the Cup before they played their first NHL game. Boldirev played his first NHL game for Boston during the 1970–71 season, Adams played his first NHL game for Boston during the 1972–73 season. Dan Schock played in the minors but was called up to play one playoff game, earning a spot on the Stanley Cup. Ron Murphy played only 20 regular-season games and had officially retired in March, but his name was engraved on the Cup.
- Boston Bruins did not have an official Captain – John Bucyk, Phil Esposito, Ed Westfall were Alternate Captains. Bucyk was presented with the Cup because he was the most senior letter-wearer (a scenario that would repeat in 1972).
- After Boston included 3 players who did not play for the team that season, the NHL only allowed players who dressed in the playoffs to be included on the Stanley Cup.
- The NHL feared that the Original Stanley Cup bowl was becoming too brittle. So a new Presentation Stanley Cup was made and first awarded in 1970. It was identical to the original bowl. The Original bowl was retired and put on permanent display at the Hockey Hall Fame.

== See also ==
- 1969–70 NHL season

Preceded by Montreal Canadiens; 1969	Boston Bruins; Stanley Cup champions 1970	Succeeded by Montreal Canadiens; 1971
