= Weston Adams =

Weston Adams may refer to:

- Weston Adams (ice hockey, born 1904) (1904–1973), American ice hockey executive with the Boston Bruins
- Weston Adams Jr. (born 1944), his son, American businessman, president of the Boston Bruins
- Weston Adams (diplomat) (born 1938), American diplomat, politician, and lawyer
