= Roger Picard =

Roger Picard may refer to:

- Roger Picard (ice hockey) (1933–2025), Canadian ice hockey player
- Roger Picard (politician) (born 1957), American politician
