= Edward J. Powers =

American business executive

- Born: 1907; Haverhill, Massachusetts, United States
- Died: May 8, 1973 (aged 65–66)
- Education: Bentley University, Northeastern University School of Business
- Occupations: Accountant, business executive
- Known for: Former president and general manager of the sports arena Boston Garden.
- Spouse: Mary Powers
- Children: 3

Edward J. Powers was an American accountant and business executive who served as president and general manager of the sport arena Boston Garden.

== Early life ==
Powers was born in Haverhill, Massachusetts. He graduated from the Bentley School of Accounting and Finance and the Northeastern University School of Business. Prior to working for the Boston Garden, Powers was a junior accountant for a Boston tool company.

== Career ==
=== Boston Garden ===
After spending months lobbying Boston Garden treasurer George Clare for a job, Powers was hired as an accounting clerk in January 1929. He moved up the ranks to the positions of vice president-assistant treasurer and then vice president-treasurer. As vice president, Powers was in charge of the Boston Garden when president Walter A. Brown was out of town. On September 16, 1964, Powers was chosen to succeed the late Brown as president and general manager of the Boston Garden.

=== Boston Bruins ===
Powers was also vice president and treasurer of the Boston Bruins and vice president of the Bruins' American Hockey League affiliate, the Boston Braves. His name was engraved on the Stanley Cup following the Bruins' victory in the 1970 and 1972 Stanley Cup Finals.

== Personal life and death ==
Powers lived in Medford, Massachusetts for many years. He and his wife had three sons. Powers was a trustee of Bentley School of Accounting and Finance and Fisher College.

Powers died on May 8, 1973. He had been hospitalized since April 23.

| Preceded by Walter A. Brown | President of the Boston Garden-Arena Corporation; 1964–73 | Succeeded by Weston Adams, Jr. |
