= Orr: My Story =

2013 autobiography by Bobby Orr

- Author: Bobby Orr
- Language: English
- Genre: Autobiography
- Publisher: G.P. Putnam's Sons
- Publication date: 2011
- Publication place: United States
- Media type: Print (Hardcover)
- Pages: 290
- ISBN: 978-0-399-16175-9
- Dewey Decimal: 796.962092-dc23
- LC Class: GV848.5.07.A33 2013

Orr: My Story is a 2013 autobiography written by former professional hockey player Bobby Orr, who played for the Boston Bruins and the Chicago Blackhawks in the National Hockey League from 1966 to 1978. Orr had multiple knee surgeries and injuries that ended his career. Orr was enshrined in the Hockey Hall of Fame in 1979 at age 31, the youngest to be inducted into the Hall at that time. Orr is also recognized for being one of the first major sports figures to use an agent. Unfortunately, at the end of his career Orr discovered that his agent, Alan Eagleson, had embezzled most of his money, leaving him deeply in debt.

On November 3, 2013, the book debuted at #8 on The New York Times Best Seller list for nonfiction.

== Summary ==
The book focuses on four major parts of Orr's life.

- Early years. Bobby Orr was born on March 20, 1948, in Parry Sound, Ontario, to Doug and Arva Orr (née Steele). As one of five children, he started playing hockey early in his life, demonstrating notable skating skills. Initially positioned as a forward, Orr was moved to defense by one of his early coaches, Bucko McDonald. McDonald emphasized a key strategy to Orr: "Never get rid of the puck when you can control it. Hold on to it and let the play open up in front of you." This advice significantly influenced Orr's playing style. During Orr's teenage years, it was not unusual for NHL teams to recruit young players. When he turned 14, the minimum age for NHL players, Orr was approached by multiple teams for recruitment. Orr eventually signed with the Boston Bruins after the persistent efforts of scout Wren Blair. At the time of his signing, Orr was in the eighth grade. His first contract, signed in 1962, was for $1,000 and included the purchase of a used car for his father and a new suit for Orr. Once under contract with the Bruins, Orr played for the Oshawa Generals of the Canadian Metro Junior A League. For his first season, Orr lived away from home and returned to see his parents and siblings on weekends. Orr spent four years playing for the Oshawa team. In 1966, when he turned 18, he was invited to the Bruins training camp, where he was given the opportunity to join the team for the regular season.
- NHL career. Orr ended the training camp as a member of the Bruins and was assigned the number "4" jersey to wear. For the 1966–1967 season, Orr was awarded the Calder Memorial Trophy for being the NHL's top rookie. It was during his rookie season that problems in his left knee developed after he was hit during a game by Marcel Pronovost of the Toronto Maple Leafs. The Bruins improved quickly and made the playoffs the two following years; then they won the 1969–1970 season Stanley Cup on May 10, 1970, when Orr scored the winning goal in overtime. As he scored, he was launched into the air after being tripped by St. Louis Blues player Noel Picard. Ray Lussier's photograph of Orr flying through the air with his hands and stick raised in victory is considered one of the most famous sports images ever captured on film. Orr led the Bruins to a Stanley Cup again in 1972. By the mid-70s, despite a troublesome knee that was causing him to play in more pain every game, Orr seemed to be at the peak of his career and the height of his earnings potential. However, when his contract ended in 1975, Eagleson told Orr that because of his knee, the Bruins were not willing to pay him what he was worth and advised Orr to become a free agent. Orr followed Eagleson's advice and eventually signed with the Blackhawks. Orr, however, was no longer able to play at his former level and spent most of his career with the Blackhawks watching from the bench. By October 1978, Orr realized that his career was over and announced his retirement.
- Relationship with Alan Eagleson. Orr devotes an entire chapter of his book to Alan Eagleson. Their relationship began in 1964 when Orr was 16 years old and attending a banquet with his parents celebrating a baseball championship. Orr was a member of the championship team that had invited Eagleson, then a lawyer and member of the Parliament of Canada, to provide an after-dinner speech. In his book, Orr recalled how well Eagleson "could speak to a room and sway people to his way of seeing things." After the dinner, Orr's parents met with Eagleson. Eventually, Orr's parents hired Eagleson as their son's agent, beginning a relationship that lasted until 1979. During those years, Eagleson played a major role in every aspect of Orr's life, especially his finances. Their relationship began to unravel when Orr left the Bruins, signed with the Blackhawks, and then found out that Eagleson had not been truthful with him regarding the offer the Bruins had made in an attempt to keep Orr in Boston. In the spring of 1979, Orr ended both their business and their personal relationship. It was then that Orr discovered that he had no money and that Eagleson could not account for the funds that had been entrusted to him by Orr.

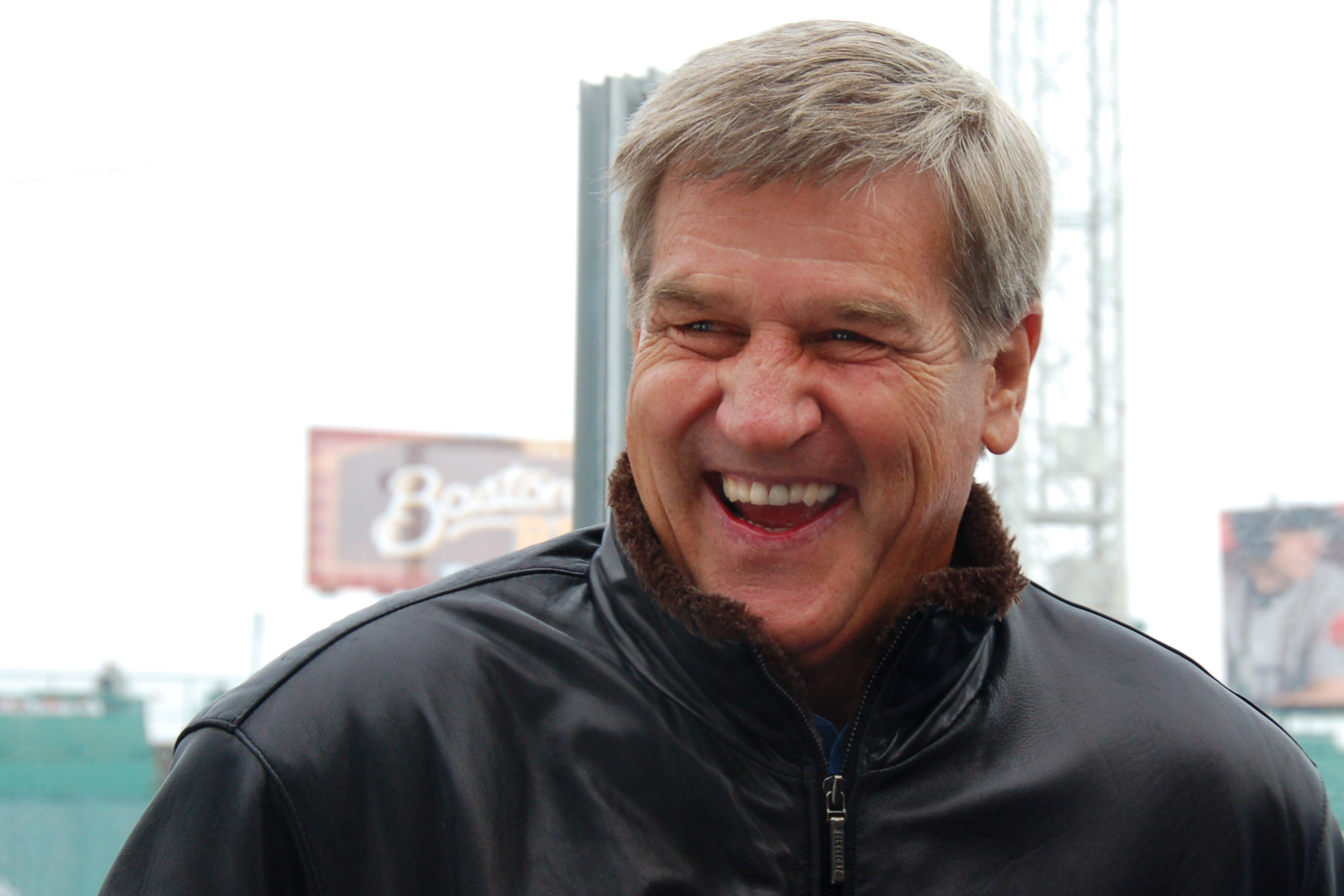
Bobby Orr at the 2010 NHL Winter Classic, January 1, 2010

- Retirement. After his retirement from the game, Orr worked as a consultant for the Blackhawks and later as a commentator for the CBC's Hockey Night in Canada. Eventually, Orr became an agent for Bob Woolf's sports group in Boston. Subsequently, Orr established his own agency, the Orr Hockey Group. In the book's final chapter, Orr offers his thoughts on the "state of the game" and emphasizes that coaches and parents should allow greater freedom for young people to play hockey so that they can enjoy the game. Orr also criticizes the year-round training programs that many young hockey players are forced to participate in and laments that they are not allowed to further themselves as athletes. By comparison, Orr recalls how much he enjoyed playing summer baseball in Canada because it allowed him to learn new skills and make new friends. Finally, Orr criticizes the NHL's emphasis on offense, which has opened up the game and led to a faster style of play which he believes has resulted in greater injuries, especially concussions.

== Reviews ==
Critics have faulted the book for not revealing new information and for not disparaging, with the exception of Eagleson, any former players, coaches or associates.

"Make no mistake, this is no barbed tell-all, but then that isn't Orr's style. For most fans there will be little that will surprise, but some of the details are likely to delight."

"I think most readers, and most of his fans, would find [the book] surprising and perhaps even a little disappointing. It is a book as dull as he was creative, as plodding as he was fast, as conservative as he was liberal in the way that he played the game."

This autobiography maintains a respectful tone, consistent with Orr's gentlemanly reputation, and surprisingly reveals aspects of his life given his known reticence. [...] This book is particularly geared towards his fans and those interested in the personal side of the hockey legend.
