= Dallas Smith (ice hockey) =

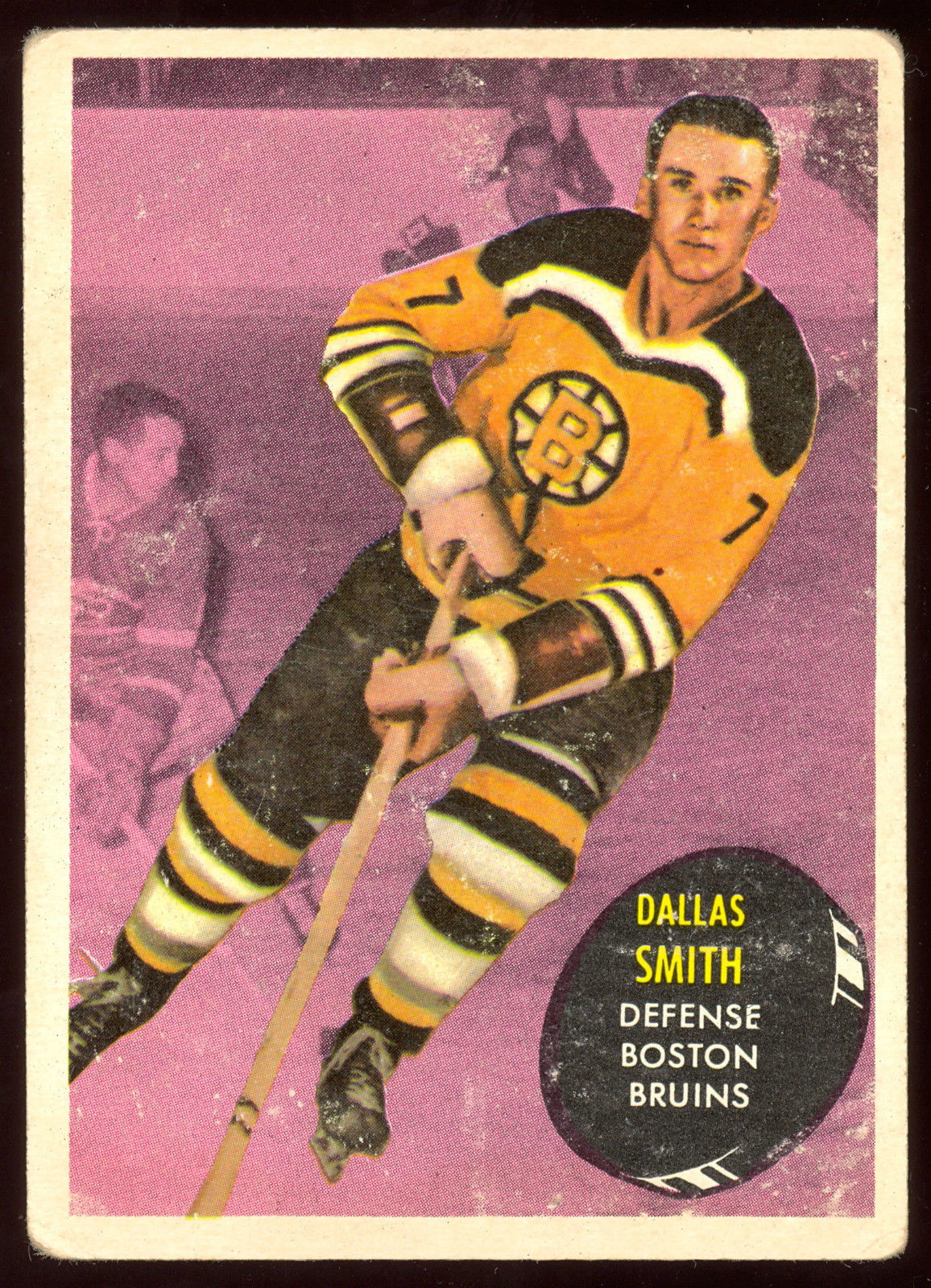
- Born: October 10, 1941 (age 85) Hamiota, Manitoba, Canada
- Height: 5 ft 11 in (180 cm)
- Weight: 180 lb (82 kg; 12 st 12 lb)
- Position: Defence
- Shot: Left
- Played for: Boston Bruins; New York Rangers
- National team: Canada
- Playing career: 1960–1978

Dallas Earl Smith (born October 10, 1941) is a Canadian former ice hockey defenceman who played fifteen seasons for the Boston Bruins and New York Rangers of the National Hockey League between 1960 and 1978. With the Bruins Smith won the Stanley Cup in 1970 and 1972. Internationally he played for the Canadian national team at the 1977 World Championships.

== Playing career ==
Signed as a teenager by the Bruins, after a junior career with their Estevan Bruins farm team, Smith had a 45 point year during the 1959-60 season. This led to Smith getting called up to make his debut with Boston in 1960. He played the full 1961 season with the club, but thereafter spent most of the next seven seasons in the minor leagues, winning Second All-Star Team accolades with the Oklahoma City Blazers of the Central Hockey League in 1966, and winning two championships with the club in 1966 and 1967.

With the 1967 NHL Expansion, Smith made the Bruins for good and, partnered with superstar Bobby Orr on defence, led the NHL in plus/minus the first season the statistic was officially tabulated. Along side Orr Smith was also a valuable member of the Bruins' penalty kill throughout his career. He gained a reputation as a solid defensive defenceman — as well as a wide repute as the league's strongest man, bolstered by his ownership of a Manitoba farm. Smith helped lead the Bruins to a Stanley Cup in 1970. His best season was 1971, during which he had a career high of 45 points, played in the NHL All-Star Game for the first time and finished with a plus/minus of +94, the fourth-highest total in history. The following year, Smith scored 32 points and once again made the All-Star Game, en route to Boston's second Stanley Cup championship in three seasons. He was also named to play in the All-Star Game in 1973 and 1974.

Smith began the 1977 season after an acrimonious contract dispute which caused him to miss training camp; he eventually signed a one-year contract the day before the season began, and . He was named interim captain of the Bruins after longtime captain John Bucyk was injured, but left the team in March after a dispute, playing for the Canadian national team in the 1977 World Championships after that. He signed as a free agent with the New York Rangers in December 1977 at the importuning of old teammate Phil Esposito, but his skills having significantly diminished, retired at season's end.

Smith finished his NHL career with 55 goals, 307 assists and 959 penalty minutes in 890 games. He currently lives in retirement with his wife Sharlene in Phoenix, also owning farm land in Oregon.

In 2023 he was named one of the top 100 Bruins players of all time.

International

Smith was initially invited to play for team Canada in the 1972 summit series, but turned down the offer due to a prior commitment on his family’s farm.

He played in 10 games for Team Canada during the 1977 Ice Hockey World Championships.

== Career statistics ==
=== Regular season and playoffs ===
			Regular season					Playoffs
Season	Team	League	GP	G	A	Pts	PIM	GP	G	A	Pts	PIM
1958–59	Estevan Bruins	SJHL	47	5	15	20	41	14	4	2	6	26
1959–60	Estevan Bruins	SJHL	59	12	33	45	102	—	—	—	—	—
1959–60	Boston Bruins	NHL	5	1	1	2	0	—	—	—	—	—
1960–61	Boston Bruins	NHL	70	1	9	10	79	—	—	—	—	—
1961–62	Boston Bruins	NHL	7	0	0	0	10	—	—	—	—	—
1961–62	Hull-Ottawa Canadiens	EPHL	3	0	0	0	0	—	—	—	—	—
1961–62	Pittsburgh Hornets	AHL	55	1	12	13	93	—	—	—	—	—
1962–63	Portland Buckaroos	WHL	68	4	18	22	64	7	1	2	3	14
1963–64	Portland Buckaroos	WHL	64	4	14	18	57	5	1	0	1	6
1964–65	San Francisco Seals	WHL	70	14	16	30	79	—	—	—	—	—
1965–66	Boston Bruins	NHL	2	0	0	0	2	—	—	—	—	—
1965–66	Oklahoma City Blazers	CHL	69	5	23	28	52	9	0	5	5	10
1966–67	Boston Bruins	NHL	33	0	1	1	24	—	—	—	—	—
1966–67	Oklahoma City Blazers	CHL	29	3	9	12	44	11	2	0	2	20
1967–68	Boston Bruins	NHL	74	4	23	27	65	4	0	2	2	0
1968–69	Boston Bruins	NHL	75	4	24	28	74	10	0	3	3	16
1969–70	Boston Bruins	NHL	75	7	17	24	119	14	0	3	3	19
1970–71	Boston Bruins	NHL	73	7	38	45	68	7	0	3	3	26
1971–72	Boston Bruins	NHL	78	8	22	30	132	15	0	4	4	22
1972–73	Boston Bruins	NHL	78	4	27	31	72	5	0	2	2	2
1973–74	Boston Bruins	NHL	77	6	21	27	64	16	1	7	8	20
1974–75	Boston Bruins	NHL	79	3	20	23	84	3	0	2	2	4
1975–76	Boston Bruins	NHL	77	7	25	32	103	11	2	2	4	19
1976–77	Boston Bruins	NHL	58	2	20	22	40	—	—	—	—	—
1977–78	New York Rangers	NHL	29	1	4	5	23	1	0	1	1	0
NHL totals			890	55	252	307	959	86	3	29	32	128

=== International ===
Year	Team	Event	GP	G	A	Pts	PIM
1977	Canada	WC	10	0	2	2	4
Senior totals			10	0	2	2	4

== Awards and achievements ==
- CPHL Second All-Star Team (1966)
- Adam’s Cup Championships (1966, 1967)
- Stanley Cup Championships (1970, 1972)
- Played in the NHL All-Star Game (1971, 1972, 1973, 1974)
- Seventh Player Award — 1973
- Honoured Member of the Manitoba Hockey Hall of Fame
- Honoured Member of the Manitoba Sports Hall of Fame and Museum
- Named one of the top 100 Bruins players of all time.
