= Rick Smith (ice hockey) =

Canadian ice hockey player

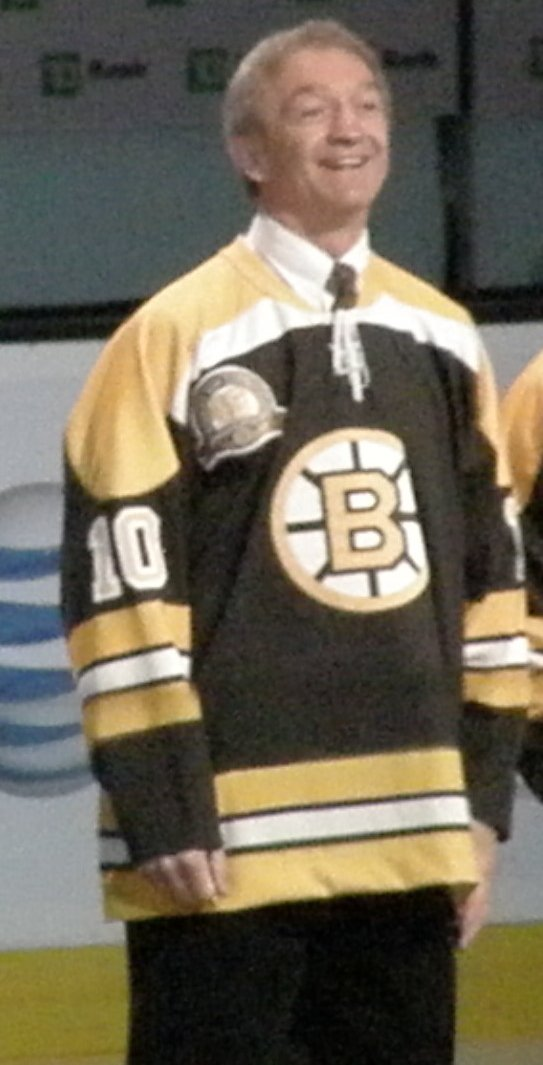
- Born: June 29, 1948 (age 78) Kingston, Ontario, Canada
- Height: 5 ft 11 in (180 cm)
- Weight: 200 lb (91 kg; 14 st 4 lb)
- Position: Defence
- Shot: Left
- Played for: Boston Bruins; California Golden Seals; Minnesota Fighting Saints (WHA); St. Louis Blues; Detroit Red Wings; Washington Capitals
- National team: Canada
- NHL draft: 7th overall, 1966; Boston Bruins
- Playing career: 1968–1981

Richard Allan Smith (born June 29, 1948) is a Canadian former professional ice hockey player. He played from 1968 until 1981 in the National Hockey League (NHL) and the World Hockey Association (WHA). He won the Stanley Cup in 1970 with the Boston Bruins.

== Playing career ==
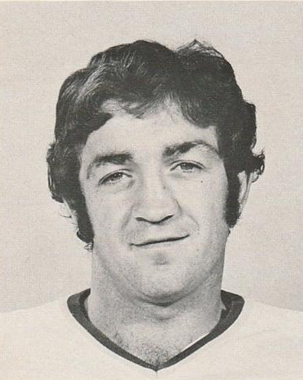
Smith in 1974 photo for Minnesota Fighting Saints

After three seasons with the Hamilton red wings Smith was originally drafted by the Boston Bruins in the second round (7th overall) in the 1966 NHL Amateur Draft. He played in Boston from 1968–69 to 1971–72. Boston traded him, along with Reggie Leach and Bob Stewart for Carol Vadnais and Don O'Donoghue in February 1972 to the California Golden Seals of the NHL. He played there until the end of the next season (1972–73) when he left the NHL for the World Hockey Association (WHA) and played for the Minnesota Fighting Saints. In 1975–76 Smith returned to the NHL to play for the St. Louis Blues. He would remain with the Blues until the 1976–77 NHL season when he returned to the Boston Bruins. In 1980 Rick Smith would leave Boston to play one more NHL season split between the Detroit Red Wings (11 games) and the Washington Capitals (40 games). He won the Stanley Cup with the Boston Bruins in 1970. Rick Smith was not a scorer but a part of talented teams who worked hard. He provided a balance to a team built around Bobby Orr.

During his time in the WHA Smith would see some great success as he would have back to back career high 38 point seasons in both 1973–74 and 1974–75. This resulted in him being named to the 1974 WHA All-Star Game. As well as getting to represent team Canada in the 1974 summit series appearing in 7 out of the 8 games.

During his second stint with the Bruins, he maintained his reputation as a reliable defenceman, culminating in a career-best 36-point NHL season in 1977–78. Widely regarded as one the steadiest blueliners of his era, Bruins coach Don Cherry frequently hailed him as "a defenseman's defenseman".

Post retirement

After 687 games in the NHL and 200 in the WHA Smith finally retired in 1981, he would then put his full attention on earning his master's degree in computer science. He would up buy 25 acres of property on Buck Lake. Then putting his degree to use to teach University staff how to use computers.

Smith Returned to Kingston, Ontario, after his retirement he has taken part in numerous Old-Timers hockey games to benefit charitable causes.

Smith has also shared his career experiences with hockey fans across North America. Travelling with the Cup to Afghanistan to visit Canadian troops in 2007 it was the first time the Cup had been taken to a war zone.

In 2010 he would return to Boston to play in the Bruins Legends Classic outdoor game at Fenway Park.

In 2023 he would be named one of the top 100 Bruins players of all time.

== Awards and achievements ==
- Stanley Cup Champion (1970)
- Played in the 1974 WHA All-Star Game
- Represented team Canada as a WHA all star in the 1974 Summit series
- OHA All-Star Second Team with Hamilton in 1966-67
- Named One of the Top 100 Best Bruins Players of all Time

== Career statistics ==
=== Regular season and playoffs ===
			Regular season					Playoffs
Season	Team	League	GP	G	A	Pts	PIM	GP	G	A	Pts	PIM
1965–66	Hamilton Red Wings	OHA	47	2	16	18	60	—	—	—	—	—
1966–67	Hamilton Red Wings	OHA	48	2	17	19	74	—	—	—	—	—
1967–68	Hamilton Red Wings	OHA	49	5	36	41	123	—	—	—	—	—
1968–69	Boston Bruins	NHL	48	0	5	5	29	9	0	0	0	6
1968–69	Oklahoma City Blazers	CHL	19	5	10	15	37	—	—	—	—	—
1969–70	Boston Bruins	NHL	69	2	8	10	65	14	1	3	4	17
1970–71	Boston Bruins	NHL	67	4	19	23	44	6	0	0	0	0
1971–72	Boston Bruins	NHL	61	2	12	14	46	—	—	—	—	—
1971–72	California Golden Seals	NHL	17	1	4	5	26	—	—	—	—	—
1972–73	California Golden Seals	NHL	64	9	24	33	77	—	—	—	—	—
1973–74	Minnesota Fighting Saints	WHA	71	10	28	38	98	11	0	1	1	22
1974–75	Minnesota Fighting Saints	WHA	78	9	29	38	112	12	2	7	9	6
1975–76	St. Louis Blues	NHL	24	1	7	8	18	3	0	1	1	4
1975–76	Minnesota Fighting Saints	WHA	51	1	32	33	50	—	—	—	—	—
1976–77	Kansas City Blues	CHL	7	1	6	7	11	—	—	—	—	—
1976–77	St. Louis Blues	NHL	18	0	1	1	6	—	—	—	—	—
1976–77	Boston Bruins	NHL	46	6	16	22	30	14	0	9	9	14
1977–78	Boston Bruins	NHL	79	7	29	36	69	15	1	5	6	18
1978–79	Boston Bruins	NHL	65	7	18	25	46	11	0	4	4	12
1979–80	Boston Bruins	NHL	78	8	18	26	62	6	1	1	2	2
1980–81	Detroit Red Wings	NHL	11	0	2	2	6	—	—	—	—	—
1980–81	Washington Capitals	NHL	40	5	4	9	36	—	—	—	—	—
WHA totals			200	20	89	109	260	23	2	8	10	28
NHL totals			687	52	167	219	560	78	3	23	26	73
