= Roger Picard (ice hockey) =

Canadian ice hockey player (1933–2025)

- Born: January 13, 1933 Montreal, Quebec, Canada
- Died: November 7, 2025 (aged 92) Repentigny, Quebec, Canada
- Height: 6 ft 0 in (183 cm)
- Weight: 200 lb (91 kg; 14 st 4 lb)
- Position: Right Wing
- Shot: Right
- Played for: St. Louis Blues
- Playing career: 1957–1969

Joseph Roger Adrien Picard (January 13, 1933 – November 7, 2025) was a Canadian professional ice hockey player and minor league head coach. He played 15 games in the National Hockey League (NHL) with the St. Louis Blues in the 1967–68 season. The rest of his career lasted from 1957 to 1969 and was spent in the minor leagues. Picard's brother, Noel Picard, also played for the St. Louis Blues.

== Playing career ==
Picard was a member of the Montreal Canadiens minor league affiliates before he went to play for the St. Louis Blues.

== Coaching career ==
After retiring he went on to become head coach with several teams in Quebec:

- Rosemont Bombardiers - QJAHL 1973–1974
- Laval Voisins - QMJHL 1981–1982
- Granby Bisons - QMJHL 1982–1984

== Personal life and death ==
Picard was born on January 13, 1933. Outside of hockey Picard and his brother Noel bred and trained horses in Quebec.

Picard died in Repentigny, Quebec on November 7, 2025, at the age of 92.

== Career statistics ==
=== Regular season and playoffs ===
| | | | Regular season | | | | | Playoffs |
| Season | Team | League | GP | G | A | Pts | PIM | GP | G | A | Pts | PIM |
|---|---|---|---|---|---|---|---|---|---|---|---|---|
| 1955–56 | Montreal Lakeshore Royals | MMJHL | 33 | 22 | 20 | 42 | 28 | — | — | — | — | — |
| 1956–57 | Montreal Lakeshore Royals | MMJHL | 33 | 12 | 21 | 33 | 28 | — | — | — | — | — |
| 1957–58 | Granby Vics | QSHL | — | — | — | — | — | — | — | — | — | — |
| 1958–59 | Granby Vics | QSHL | — | — | — | — | — | — | — | — | — | — |
| 1959–60 | Granby Vics | QSHL | — | — | — | — | — | — | — | — | — | — |
| 1960–61 | Granby Vics | QSHL | 28 | 13 | 10 | 23 | 21 | 9 | 10 | 4 | 14 | 4 |
| 1961–62 | Sherbrooke Castors | ETSHL | 20 | 6 | 9 | 15 | 20 | 7 | 6 | 5 | 11 | 8 |
| 1961–62 | Montreal Olympics | Al-Cup | — | — | — | — | — | 16 | 7 | 8 | 15 | 14 |
| 1962–63 | Montreal Olympics | QSHL | — | — | — | — | — | — | — | — | — | — |
| 1963–64 | Montreal Olympics | QSHL | — | — | — | — | — | — | — | — | — | — |
| 1964–65 | Drummondville Eagles | QSHL | 38 | 20 | 33 | 53 | 20 | 5 | 1 | 3 | 4 | 20 |
| 1965–66 | Drummondville Eagles | QSHL | 41 | 21 | 33 | 54 | 47 | 9 | 0 | 6 | 6 | 21 |
| 1966–67 | Drummondville Eagles | Al-Cup | — | — | — | — | — | 11 | 3 | 6 | 9 | 22 |
| 1967–68 | St. Louis Blues | NHL | 15 | 2 | 2 | 4 | 21 | — | — | — | — | — |
| 1967–68 | Kansas City Blues | CHL | 43 | 15 | 28 | 43 | 82 | 7 | 0 | 10 | 10 | 21 |
| 1968–69 | Denver Spurs | WHL | 26 | 6 | 3 | 9 | 8 | — | — | — | — | — |
| 1968–69 | Buffalo Bisons | AHL | 11 | 5 | 4 | 9 | 4 | — | — | — | — | — |
| 1968–69 | Omaha Knights | CHL | 31 | 9 | 11 | 20 | 41 | 1 | 0 | 0 | 0 | 0 |
| NHL totals | | | 15 | 2 | 2 | 4 | 21 | — | — | — | — | — |
