= Gary Doak =

Canadian-American ice hockey player

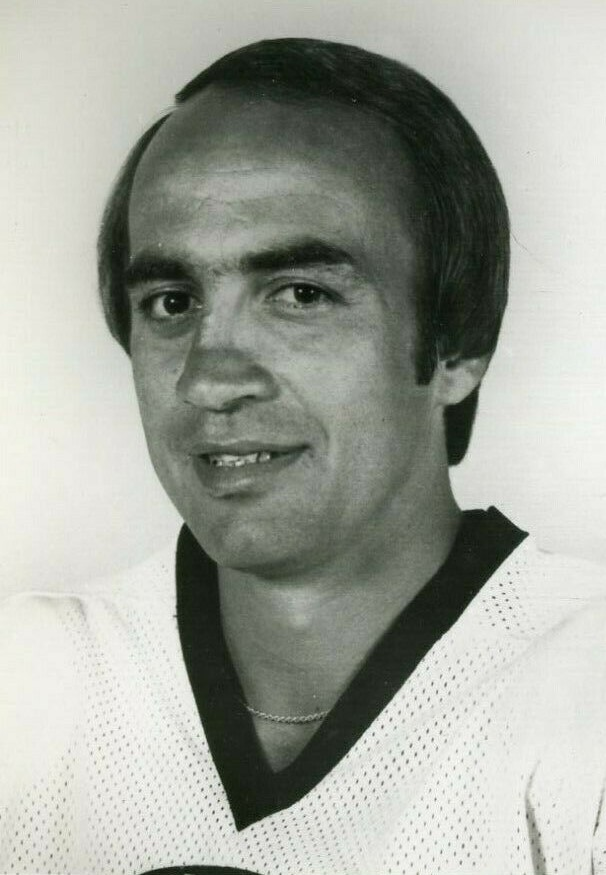
- Born: February 25, 1946 Goderich, Ontario, Canada
- Died: March 25, 2017 (aged 71) Lynnfield, Massachusetts, U.S.
- Height: 5 ft 11 in (180 cm)
- Weight: 188 lb (85 kg; 13 st 6 lb)
- Position: Defence
- Shot: Right
- Played for: Detroit Red Wings; Boston Bruins; Vancouver Canucks; New York Rangers
- Playing career: 1965–1981

Gary Walter Doak (February 25, 1946 – March 25, 2017) was a Canadian-American National Hockey League defenceman who played for the Detroit Red Wings, Boston Bruins, Vancouver Canucks and New York Rangers. He recorded 23 goals and 107 assists for a total of 130 points in 789 NHL regular season games.

With the Bruins he won the Stanley Cup in 1970. Doak was also the first player selected by the Canucks when they joined the NHL in 1970, selected second in the 1970 NHL Expansion Draft. During the 1971–72 NHL season he was then traded to the Rangers, which lost the 1972 Stanley Cup Final against his old team, the Bruins. Joining the Red Wings for the 1972–73 NHL season, Doak was traded to the Bruins midseason, where he spent the rest of his playing career.

Following retirement, Doak was the Boston Bruins' assistant coach from 1981–82 to the 1984–85 season. He also coached at the University of Massachusetts Boston for two years.

Doak died on March 25, 2017, at the age of 71 in Lynnfield, Massachusetts.

In 2023 he would be named one of the top 100 Bruins players of all time.

== Career statistics ==
=== Regular season and playoffs ===
			Regular season					Playoffs
Season	Team	League	GP	G	A	Pts	PIM	GP	G	A	Pts	PIM
1962–63	Hamilton Red Wings	OHA	50	3	10	13	83	5	0	0	0	17
1963–64	Hamilton Red Wings	OHA	55	2	31	33	162	—	—	—	—	—
1963–64	Pittsburgh Hornets	AHL	1	0	0	0	0	—	—	—	—	—
1964–65	Hamilton Red Wings	OHA	56	8	26	34	216	—	—	—	—	—
1964–65	Pittsburgh Hornets	AHL	2	1	0	1	4	3	0	0	0	4
1965–66	Detroit Red Wings	NHL	4	0	0	0	12	—	—	—	—	—
1965–66	Pittsburgh Hornets	AHL	48	0	6	6	88	—	—	—	—	—
1965–66	Boston Bruins	NHL	20	0	8	8	28	—	—	—	—	—
1966–67	Boston Bruins	NHL	29	0	1	1	50	—	—	—	—	—
1966–67	Oklahoma City Blazers	CHL	17	4	3	7	96	—	—	—	—	—
1967–68	Boston Bruins	NHL	59	2	10	12	100	4	0	0	0	4
1968–69	Boston Bruins	NHL	22	3	3	6	37	—	—	—	—	—
1969–70	Boston Bruins	NHL	44	1	7	8	63	8	0	0	0	9
1969–70	Oklahoma City Blazers	CHL	13	1	5	6	53	—	—	—	—	—
1970–71	Vancouver Canucks	NHL	77	2	10	12	112	—	—	—	—	—
1971–72	Vancouver Canucks	NHL	6	0	1	1	23	—	—	—	—	—
1971–72	New York Rangers	NHL	49	1	10	11	54	12	0	0	0	46
1972–73	Detroit Red Wings	NHL	44	0	5	5	51	—	—	—	—	—
1972–73	Boston Bruins	NHL	5	0	0	0	2	2	0	0	0	2
1973–74	Boston Bruins	NHL	69	0	4	4	44	—	—	—	—	—
1974–75	Boston Bruins	NHL	40	0	0	0	30	3	0	0	0	4
1975–76	Boston Bruins	NHL	58	1	6	7	60	12	1	0	1	22
1976–77	Boston Bruins	NHL	76	3	13	16	107	14	0	2	2	26
1977–78	Boston Bruins	NHL	61	4	13	17	50	12	1	0	1	4
1978–79	Boston Bruins	NHL	63	6	11	17	28	7	0	2	2	4
1979–80	Boston Bruins	NHL	52	0	5	5	45	4	0	0	0	0
1980–81	Boston Bruins	NHL	11	0	0	0	12	—	—	—	—	—
NHL totals			789	23	107	130	908	78	2	4	6	121
