= Weston Adams (ice hockey, born 1904) =

American hockey executive (1904–1973)

Francis Weston Woollard Adams (August 9, 1904 – March 19, 1973) was an American hockey executive with the Boston Bruins of the National Hockey League. He is a member of the Hockey Hall of Fame.

== Early life ==
Adams was born in Springfield, Massachusetts. He attended Phillips Exeter Academy and graduated from Harvard where he played Goaltender on the varsity team.

== Boston Bruins ==
=== Early experience ===
In 1924, Adam's father, Charles Adams, founded the Boston Bruins. Although he was still a student at the time, Adams was very involved with the team. In 1932 he became president of the Canadian American Hockey League farm team, the Boston Tigers. His ability to recognize talent was invaluable to the growth of the Bruins' player development system.

=== First tenure as president ===
In 1936, Adams became majority owner and team president of the Bruins when his father transferred his stock to him, Art Ross, and Ralph Burkard. While Adams was president of the Bruins, the team finished first in the NHL American Division from 1937–38 season to the 1940–41 regular season. They won the Stanley Cup in 1939, and 1941. During his tenure as president Adams remained involved in the player development process, monitoring the progress of players with the Tigers and the Providence Reds of the American Hockey League.

During World War II, Adams served the United States Navy from January 1942 to May 1946, eventually working his way up to the rank of commander. He served in both the Atlantic and Pacific, mostly on escort and convoy duty.

=== Sale of team ===
In 1951 the Boston Garden-Arena Corporation purchased controlling interest in the team. Adams remained a major stockholder in the Garden-Arena Corporation and he became its chairman in 1951. The team's struggled during the first few seasons under the Garden-Arena Corporation, until Adams took on a more proactive role in player procurement.

=== Second tenure as president ===
Adams was again named president of the Bruins after Walter A. Brown's death in 1964. Upon regaining control of the team, Adams worked to rebuild Boston's farm system. He fostered strong working relationships with powerful junior clubs, including the Niagara Falls Flyers and the Estevan Bruins, which could develop and supply players. Adams logged many hours traveling across Canada to scout players. Over the next few years, he brought in such players as Bobby Orr, Wayne Cashman, Dallas Smith, Don Awrey, Don Marcotte, Derek Sanderson and Eddie Westfall. He also developed the concept of the sixth attacker and secured the relationship with the AHL's Boston Braves due to the AHL's loss of many players to the expanding NHL.

On March 31, 1969, he was succeeded as team president by his son, Weston Adams, Jr. He remained on as chairman of the board until 1973. Boston would win 2 more Stanley Cups in 1970, and 1972.

Weston was elected to the Hockey Hall of Fame as an Honoured Builder in 1972.

== Other teams ==
In addition to the Bruins, Adams owned the Boston Braves, Oshawa Generals, Boston Rovers, a horse racing stable, and was a member of the Suffolk Downs board of directors. He also served as travelling secretary of the Boston Braves baseball club.

== Boston Stock Exchange ==
Adams was a member of the Boston Stock Exchange from 1929 to 1969. From 1938 to 1942 and from 1962 to 1969 he was a member of the BSE's board of directors. From 1953 to 1962 he served as its vice president. He then served as president of the exchange from 1962 to 1963.

== Personal life and death ==
On January 8, 1933, Adams married Mildred Culver Boyd of Lansdowne, Pennsylvania. The couple had two children. They divorced in 1936. On September 26, 1936, he married Nancy E. (Atkins) Gordon, ex-wife of playwright Leon Gordon. Adams had two children with her.

Adams died on March 19, 1973, at his home in Brookline, Massachusetts.

Preceded by Charles Adams	President of the Boston Bruins; 1936–51	Succeeded by Walter A. Brown
Preceded by Charles Adams	Boston Bruins principal owner 1936–51	Succeeded by Boston Garden-Arena Corporation
Preceded by Walter A. Brown	President of the Boston Bruins; 1964–69	Succeeded by Weston Adams, Jr.
