= Walter A. Brown =

American basketball and hockey team owner (1905–1964)

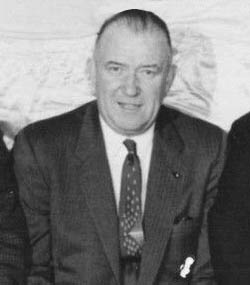
- Brown in 1960
- Born: February 10, 1905; Hopkinton, Massachusetts, U.S.
- Died: September 7, 1964 (aged 59); Hyannis, Massachusetts, U.S.
- Occupations: Basketball team owner Ice hockey coach and team owner
- Known for: Founder and owner of the Boston Celtics
- Honors: Hockey Hall of Fame (1962); Basketball Hall of Fame (1965); IIHF Hall of Fame (1997); No. 1 retired by Boston Celtics

Walter Augustine Brown (February 10, 1905 – September 7, 1964) was an American sports executive. He was the founder and original owner of the Boston Celtics, operated the Boston Garden-Arena Corporation, and served as president of the Boston Athletic Association. In ice hockey, he coached the Boston Olympics to five Eastern Hockey League championships, owned the Boston Bruins, and served as president of the International Ice Hockey Federation. He was inducted into the Hockey Hall of Fame in 1962, the Naismith Memorial Basketball Hall of Fame in 1965, and IIHF Hall of Fame in 1997.

== Life ==
Walter Brown was born in Hopkinton, Massachusetts, and attended Boston Latin from 1922 to 1923 and Phillips Exeter Academy from 1923 to 1926. After succeeding his father, George V. Brown, as manager of the Boston Garden, he stated his belief that, "Boston should have a basketball team." Taking a mortgage out on his home, he founded the Celtics in 1945. He then helped to found the Basketball Association of America in 1946, and was instrumental in merging the BAA and the National Basketball League into the National Basketball Association in 1949.

Brown ran the Celtics as a subsidiary of the Boston Garden-Arena Corporation until 1950, when he bought the team in his own name and took on former Providence Steamrollers owner Lou Pieri as a minority partner. He oversaw the transformation of the Celtics into a dynasty, as they won six championships in the seven years before his death. He is buried in St. John the Evangelist Cemetery in Hopkinton, Massachusetts.

Brown was the President of the Boston Athletic Association from 1941 to 1964. In 1951 during the height of the Korean War, Brown denied Koreans entry into the Boston Marathon. He stated: "While American soldiers are fighting and dying in Korea, every Korean should be fighting to protect his country instead of training for marathons. As long as the war continues there, we positively will not accept Korean entries for our race on April 19."

== Hockey ==
Brown also played an important role in the development of hockey; he coached the amateur Boston Olympics to five Eastern Hockey League championships and guided the US to its first gold medal in the Ice Hockey World Championships in 1933. In February 1940, Brown and eight other arena managers organized the Ice Capades. In 1951, he bought the financially strapped Boston Bruins; he had been the Bruins' landlord since becoming the Garden's manager. He served as the president of the International Ice Hockey Federation from 1954 to 1957.

The Walter A. Brown International Hockey Tournament was held in Colorado Springs, Colorado from 1964 to 1968. That "Brown Trophy" can be seen in at least one publication from the Pikes Peak region.

== Death ==
Brown died on September 7, 1964, in Hyannis, MA, of a heart attack. His share of Celtics ownership passed to his widow, Marjorie Brown, who sold the team the following year.

== Honors ==
The Boston Celtics retired uniform number "1" in Brown's honor in 1964.

Brown was honored by having the NBA championship trophy named after him after he died in 1964.

He was inducted into the Hockey Hall of Fame in 1962, the Naismith Memorial Basketball Hall of Fame in 1965, and IIHF Hall of Fame in 1997, its inaugural year.

== See also ==
- Walter Brown Arena

Preceded by George V. Brown	General Manager of the Boston Garden; 1937–1964	Succeeded by Edward J. Powers
Preceded by Clarence A. Barnes	President of the Boston Athletic Association; 1940–1964	Succeeded by Will Cloney
Preceded by First	President of the Boston Celtics; 1946–1963	Succeeded by Louis Pieri
Preceded by First	Boston Celtics general manager 1946–1951	Succeeded by Red Auerbach
Preceded by Boston Garden-Arena Corporation	Boston Celtics principal owner 1950–1964	Succeeded by Louis Pieri and Marjorie Brown
Preceded by Weston Adams, Sr.	President of the Boston Bruins; 1951–1964	Succeeded by Weston Adams, Sr.
Preceded by Fritz Kraatz	President of the IIHF; 1954–1957	Succeeded by Bunny Ahearne
