= Noel Picard =

Canadian ice hockey player

Noël Picard
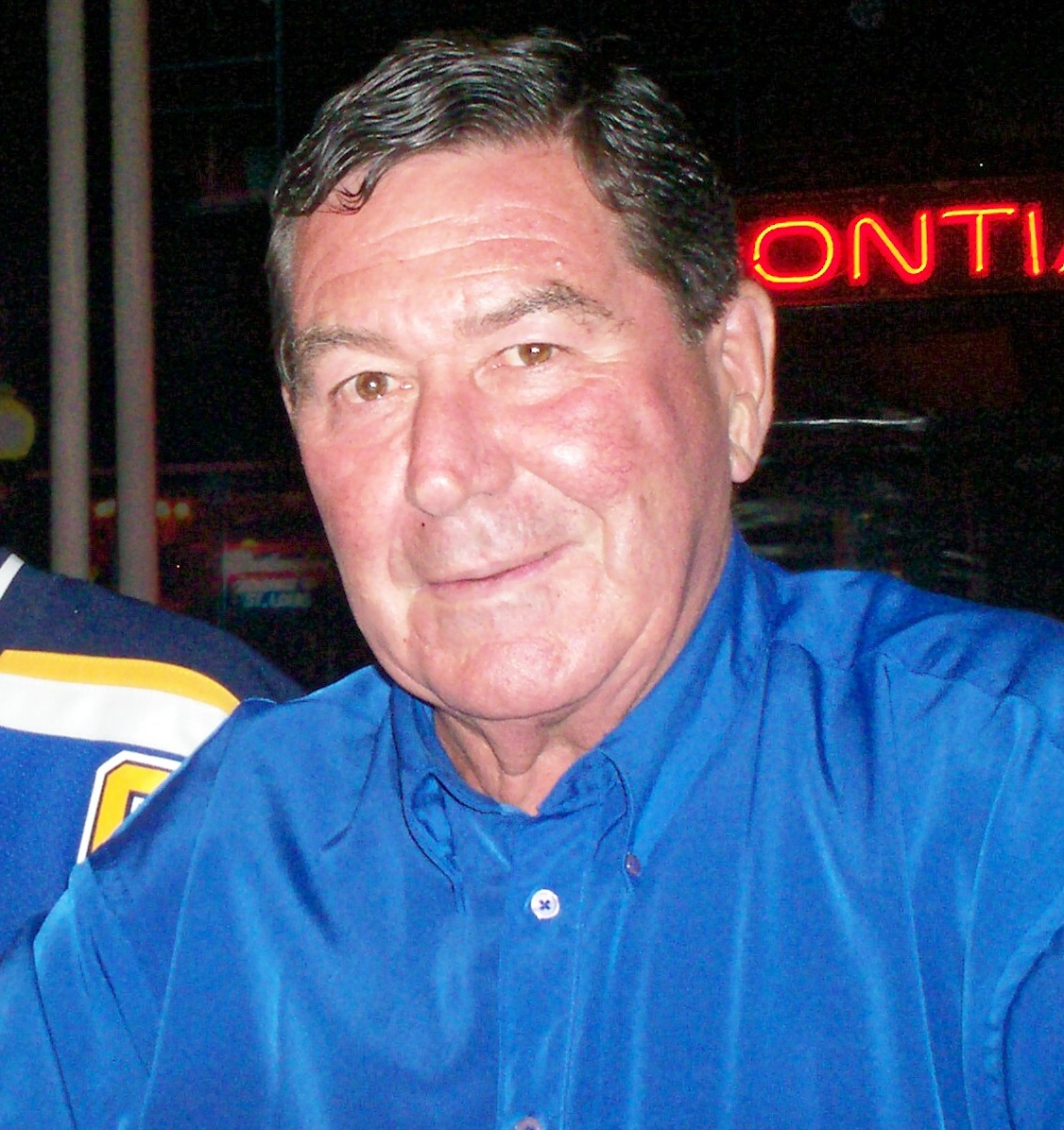
- Noel Picard in 2005
- Born: December 25, 1938 Montreal, Quebec, Canada
- Died: September 6, 2017 (aged 78) Montreal, Quebec, Canada
- Height: 6 ft 1 in (185 cm)
- Weight: 180 lb (82 kg; 12 st 12 lb)
- Position: Defence
- Shot: Right
- Played for: Montreal Canadiens; St. Louis Blues; Atlanta Flames
- Playing career: 1960–1973

Joseph Jean-Noël Yves Picard (December 25, 1938 – September 6, 2017) was a Canadian ice hockey defenceman who played in the National Hockey League (NHL) from 1965 to 1973.

== Playing career ==
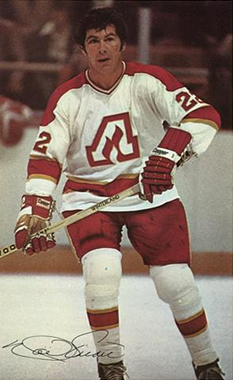
Noel Picard in 1972 for Atlanta Flames

Picard started his NHL career with the Montreal Canadiens in 1965. He later played for the St. Louis Blues and Atlanta Flames. Picard retired after the 1973 season, winning one Stanley Cup with Montreal in 1965. He is noted for tripping Bobby Orr of the Boston Bruins after Orr scored the series-winning goal of the 1970 Stanley Cup Final, sending a jumping Orr flying through the air with his arms raised in celebration. This image stands as one of the most famous action shots in North American sports history.

== Personal life ==
Picard was a broadcaster for Blues games after he retired. He purchased Midway, a restaurant in Cuba, Missouri, in 1976 and later sold. He returned to Montreal, where he died in 2017.

Picard had two children with his wife Viviane who were raised in the St. Louis area; a daughter Annie in Chicago, and son Dan (who lives in New Baden, Illinois). Picard was the younger brother of Roger Picard, with whom he briefly played in St. Louis for one season.

== Career statistics ==
=== Regular season and playoffs ===
			Regular season					Playoffs
Season	Team	League	GP	G	A	Pts	PIM	GP	G	A	Pts	PIM
1959–60	Peterborough Petes	OHA	29	1	3	4	22	12	2	1	3	4
1960–61	Jersey Larks	EHL	55	2	6	8	55	—	—	—	—	—
1961–62	Montreal Olympics	Qué-Sr.	18	3	7	10	8	6	1	3	4	17
1961–62	Montreal Olympics	Al-Cup	—	—	—	—	—	15	2	6	8	38
1962–63	Sherbrooke Castors	Qué-Sr.	—	—	—	—	—	1	0	0	0	0
1963–64	Omaha Knights	CPHL	59	4	25	29	147	9	1	2	3	12
1964–65	Montreal Canadiens	NHL	16	0	7	7	33	3	0	1	1	0
1964–65	Omaha Knights	CPHL	50	13	23	36	142	—	—	—	—	—
1965–66	Houston Apollos	CPHL	58	3	15	18	186	—	—	—	—	—
1966–67	Seattle Totems	WHL	63	3	24	27	135	10	2	5	7	16
1966–67	Providence Reds	AHL	9	0	3	3	17	—	—	—	—	—
1967–68	St. Louis Blues	NHL	66	1	10	11	142	13	0	3	3	46
1968–69	St. Louis Blues	NHL	67	5	19	24	131	12	1	4	5	30
1969–70	St. Louis Blues	NHL	39	1	4	5	88	16	0	2	2	65
1970–71	St. Louis Blues	NHL	75	3	8	11	119	6	1	1	2	26
1971–72	St. Louis Blues	NHL	15	1	5	6	50	—	—	—	—	—
1972–73	St. Louis Blues	NHL	16	1	0	1	10	—	—	—	—	—
1972–73	Atlanta Flames	NHL	41	0	10	10	43	—	—	—	—	—
NHL totals			335	12	63	75	616	50	2	11	13	167
