= Johnny Bucyk =

Canadian ice hockey player (born 1935)

- Hockey Hall of Fame, 1981
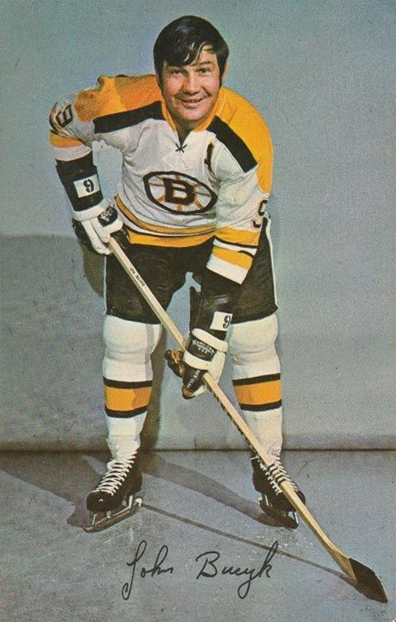
- Bucyk with the Boston Bruins in 1971
- Born: May 12, 1935 (age 91) Edmonton, Alberta, Canada
- Height: 6 ft 0 in (183 cm)
- Weight: 215 lb (98 kg; 15 st 5 lb)
- Position: Left wing
- Shot: Left
- Played for: Detroit Red Wings; Boston Bruins
- Playing career: 1955–1978

John Paul "Chief" Bucyk (born May 12, 1935) is a Canadian former professional ice hockey player and member of the Hockey Hall of Fame. A left winger, he played most of his career with the Boston Bruins, he has been associated in one capacity or another with the Bruins' organization since the late 1950s. Bucyk was named one of the '100 Greatest NHL Players' in 2017.

Bucyk was considered a skilled left winger and the largest of his day. While he never was regarded as the best at his position (being a contemporary of superstars Bobby Hull and Frank Mahovlich), he had a long and notable career, and retired as the fourth leading point scorer of all time and having played the third-most games in history, and recorded sixteen seasons of scoring twenty goals or more. Despite his reputation for devastating hip checks, he was a notably clean player who won the Lady Byng Memorial Trophy for sportsmanship in 1971 and 1974. Bucyk was the senior alternate captain of the Bruins when they won Stanley Cups in 1970 and 1972.

Following his retirement Bucyk has remained a member of the Bruins serving many different roles such as commentator, director and now currently works as an ambassador for the team.

== Early life ==
Bucyk was born in Edmonton to Sam and Pearl Bucyk, Ukrainian immigrants from the village of Butsiv, in what is now Yavoriv Raion, Lviv Oblast, Ukraine. The family was poor, with Pearl working two jobs and his father, Sam, was unemployed for over four years. Due to this much of his early equipment consisted of broomsticks and other homemade gear, he originally started out as a goalie with his pads being made out of magazines and old catalogs. His father died when Bucyk was 11 years old. Poverty prevented Bucyk from owning a pair of ice skates which resulted in him only playing street hockey up until he was 13 years old when he finally got his first skates which were hand me downs from his brother Bill.

During the offseason, Bucyk returned to Edmonton and worked at the car dealership that sponsored his junior team.

== Junior and minor-league career ==
Bucyk played junior hockey for four seasons for his hometown Edmonton Oil Kings before signing with the Detroit Red Wings in 1955. Bucyk was originally an awkward skater, and Oil Kings coach Ken McAuley arranged for Bucyk to train offseason with a figure skater until his technique improved. He went on to be one of the leading scorers on a strong Oil Kings squad that included future Hall of Famer Norm Ullman. The team won the Abbott Cup in 1954 and Bucyk and the Oil Kings went to the 1954 Memorial Cup final against the St. Catharines Teepees, with Bucyk scoring a blistering 28 goals in 21 playoff games to lead the WCHL, as well as 14 goals in 14 Memorial Cup games to lead all scorers that season.

Following the Memorial Cup final, Bucyk signed a professional contract with the Edmonton Flyers of the Western Hockey League, the minor league affiliate of the Detroit Red Wings. There, he was reunited with junior teammate Ullman, and paired on a line with future Bruins teammates Bronco Horvath and Vic Stasiuk. It was during this time that Horvath was responsible for nicknaming Bucyk "Chief", purportedly out of Horvath's admiration for how Bucyk used his stick like a tomahawk to fight for pucks along the boards. In 1955, his lone full season with the Flyers, he finished second on the team to Horvath with 30 goals, 58 assists and 88 points as the Flyers won the league championship.

== NHL career ==
=== Detroit Red Wings ===
Following the 1955 WHL playoffs, Detroit called Bucyk up for the 1955 Stanley Cup playoffs. Practicing with the team as a so-called "Black Ace", he saw no game action, as Detroit defeated the Montreal Canadiens four games to three for the Cup. Unusually, his first NHL game was in the 1955 All-Star Game, played in October between the defending Cup champion Red Wings and an all-star team from the rest of the league. He saw only spot duty in his rookie season of 1956 scoring his first NHL goal against Gump Worsley on December 11th 1955 in a 2-0 victory over the Rangers. He finished the year with 38 appearances on the year with 9 points (1 goal, 9 assists). During the postseason Bucyk appeared in all 10 playoffs games scoring both his first NHL playoff goal and assist as the Red Wings beat Toronto to advance to the 1956 Stanley Cup final, however they were defeated by Montreal 4-1.

The following year Bucyk made 6 appearances for the Edmonton Flyers before returning to the Red Wings squad for the rest of the 1956-57 season where he played in 66 games scoring 10 goals and 11 assists. Bucyk once again appeared in all 5 postseason games but the Red Wings were defeated by Bucyk's future team the Boston Bruins 4-1. Bucyk's scoring output with Detroit wasn't indicative of his talent; it was more due to being sat during certain points in games by Jimmy Skinner. Bucyk later recalled "My first two NHL years with Detroit, I usually got on the ice if we were up five goals or down five goals," Bucyk said, laughing again. "I used to sit on the end of the bench, catch cold and watch Gordie Howe.

=== Boston Bruins ===
==== 1950s ====
Going into the 1958 season, the Boston Bruins had acquired Horvath and Stasiuk, and general manager Lynn Patrick believed that reuniting them with Bucyk would recapture the success they had in Edmonton. Detroit dealt him to the Bruins in a surprising deal for Terry Sawchuk, one of the greatest goaltenders of the day.

Bucyk later commented on his initial thoughts on being traded to Boston stating:

I was only in Detroit for two years. I didn't get much ice time, I was a little worried when I first came to Boston, but I was coming to Boston and I was going to play with Vic and Bronco Horvath, who I had played with back in Edmonton in the minors. That made it really easy and comfortable. I had players that I had played with before. I just fit right in. I got in and they put us together. (General manager) Lynn Patrick and (coach) Milt Schmidt just put the three of us back together, and we played well as a youth line.

Bucyk became the top left wing in Boston playing with his "Uke Line" partners of Stasiuk and Horvath, who had previously played together in Edmonton. During his first year with the Bruins in 1957-58 Bucyk's scoring doubled and the trio had an immediate impact, leading the Bruins to the Stanley Cup Finals in 1958, with Horvath finishing fifth in league scoring, and Bucyk and Stasiuk each scoring 21 goals. Buyck finished the year with 57 points in 68 games. The moniker "Uke Line" came from the trio's purported Ukrainian background (in fact, Stasiuk was of Hungarian origins). Bucyk's first hat trick was scored in one of the first nationally televised games, a 7–4 win over the New York Rangers. Throughout his first 3 seasons in the NHL Bucyk was paid $6,500 a year. Throughout the rest of his time with Boston Bucyk would only sign one year contracts, besides a successful stretch during the mid 1960s when he signed a 3 year deal. He later commented on why he only signed one year deals stating "I felt that if signed a one-year contract, I had to produce to get a new contract the next year."

Buyck's numbers went up once again the following year in 1958-59 where he scored 24 goals and 36 assists in 69 games. During a game vs. Chicago on November 11, 1958 Bucyk recorded an at the time career best 5, points (3 goals 2 assists) in a Bruins 8-4 victory. He appeared in all 7 postseason games scoring 6 points however the Bruins were defeated 4-3 Toronto in the first round.

==== 1960s ====
Bucyk and his Uke Line linemates continued to star together (Horvath losing the league scoring championship to Bobby Hull by a single point in 1960). That year Bucyk failed to score 20+ goals but was still nearly a point per game scorer with 52 points in 56 appearances including a 5 point game vs. Chicago on November 3, 1959. However the Bruins failed to make the playoffs. The following year in the 1960-61 season, the trio's defensive deficiencies caused coach Milt Schmidt to break the Uke lineup. Bucyk was then paired with Stasiuk and Jerry Toppazzini, before the Ukes were reunited, but the line was permanently broken up with Stasiuk and Horvath both being traded by the 1961 offseason, with the team missing the playoffs for a second straight year. That year Bucyk appeared in all 70 games scoring 19 goals and 20 assists.

Boston fell on hard times in the 1960s, and once again during the 1961-62 season the Bruins finished in last place. During this time Bucyk — generally paired with centre Murray Oliver and winger Tommy Williams as the "BOW" line. Despite the Bruins lack of success Buyck ended up becoming one of the teams few stars and led the team in points scoring 20 goals and 40 assists in 67 appearances. The following year in 1962-63 Bucyk led the Bruins in Goals (27), assists (39) and points (66). This led to Bucyk being selected to the 1963 All Star game. Buyck had another solid year the following year in 1963-64 appearing in 62 games, scoring 18 goals and 36 assists. Buyck would then go on to lead the team in goals, assist and points in 1964-65 with 55 points (26 goals 29 assists. This led to him being selected to play in the NHL All Star game for a third consecutive year.

During the 1965-66 campaign Bucyk was named one of three alternate captains and appeared in 63 games scoring 27 goals and 30 assists. Bucyk started off the 1966-67 season by naming named the Bruins sole captain for the first time. During the season he went on to score his 200th goal, along with leading the team in points (48) and assists (30). However the Bruins missed the playoffs for an eighth straight year—a then-league record—in which the Bruins would miss the playoffs.

==== Return to glory ====
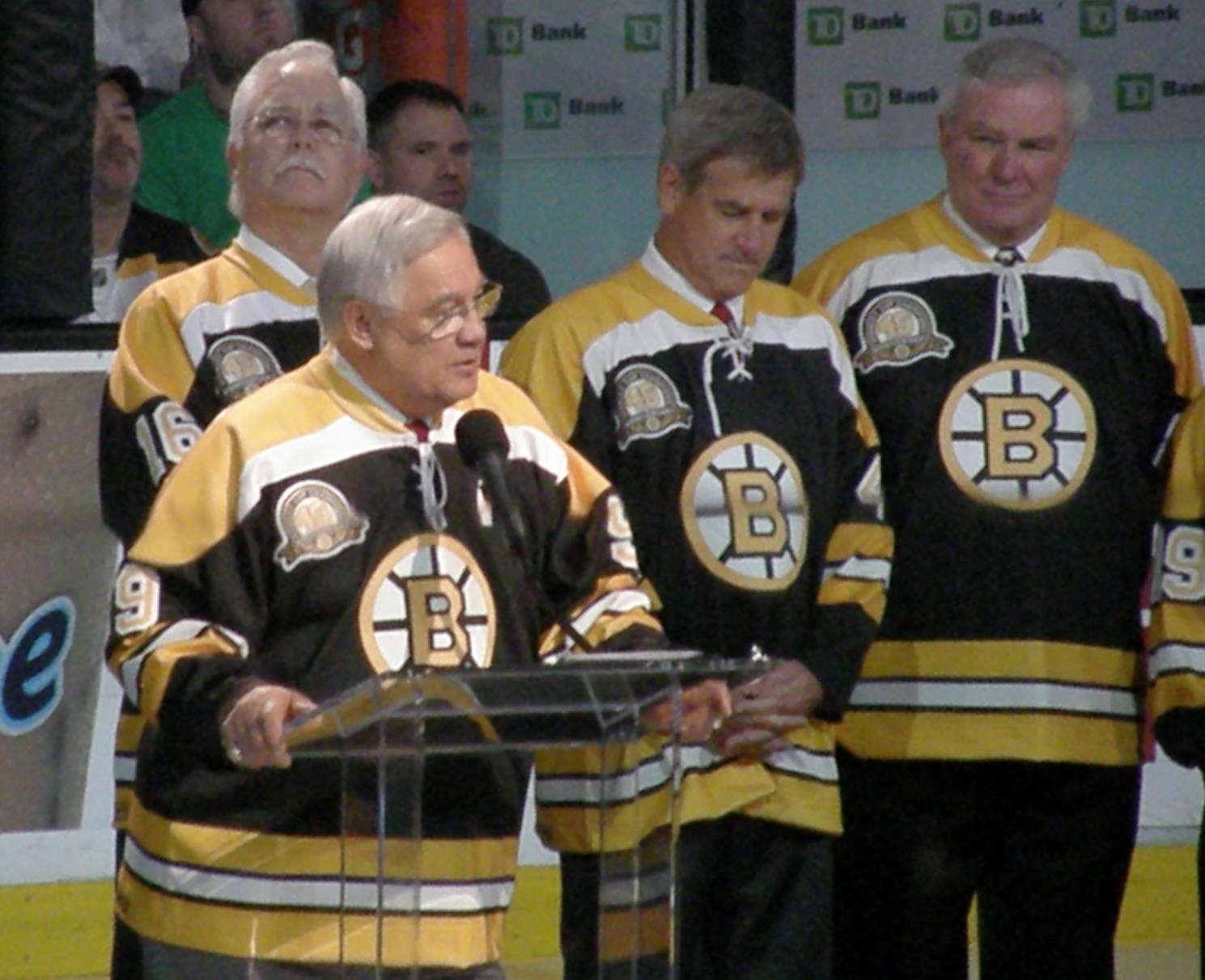
Bucyk with Derek Sanderson, Bobby Orr and Ken Hodge in 2010

Assembling a team behind the acquisitions of Bobby Orr Phil Esposito and Ken Hodge in 1967-1968, Bucyk and the Bruins were able to return to prominence for the first time in nearly a decade. Bucyk was once again named one of the teams 3 alternate captains, and in 72 appearances he would have his first of 7 30+ goal seasons along with 39 assists, finishing second behind Esposito in team scoring (and ninth in league scoring). For his efforts Bucyk was named to his fifth All-Star Game, and was named to the leagues Second Team All-Star for the first time in his career. In addition the Bruins broke their streak of missing the playoffs however they were eliminated in the first round. During this period Bucyk proved particularly effective playing on the left side on Boston's greatly feared power-play unit, which featured Phil Esposito, John McKenzie, Bobby Orr and Fred Stanfield. He also was a highly accurate shooter, finishing in the top ten in the league in shooting percentage in eleven seasons, and leading the league in 1971, 1973, and 1974.

The 1968-69 season saw Bucyk play in 70 games, scoring 24 goals and 42 assists. The Bruins made the postseason for a second straight year and Bucyk appeared in all 10 playoff games scoring 11 points (5 goals 6 assists) The Bruins defeated Toronto in the first round but were defeated by Montreal 4-2 in the semifinals.

Early in the 1969-70 season Bucyk recorded his second 5+ point game scoring 2 goals and 3 assists during a game vs. Pittsburgh in a Bruins 6-4 victory. Bucyk would finish the regular season appearing in 76 games scoring a career high at that point 31 goals along with 38 assists. and being named to play in the 1970 NHL All-Star Game. The Bruins finished second in the East Division that year and Bucyk would play a pivotal role in helping the Bruins postseason run appearing in all 14 games he finished fourth in team scoring and second in goal scoring in the playoffs with 19 points. The Bruins then reached the 1970 Stanley cup finals where they faced St Louis, in game 1 Bucyk would score a hat trick as the Bruins won 6-0. Then in game 4 Bucyk would score a pivotal goal to tie the game up and send it to overtime, which led to Bobby Orr iconic series winning goal. While he had not been the team's captain after 1967, as the senior assistant captain, he had the honor of being the first to ceremonially skate the Stanley Cup around the Boston Garden ice.

The 1970–71 season saw the Bruins break 37 individual and team league records en route to the best record in league history. Early in the season Bucyk played his 1,000th NHL game on December 10, 1970, and had one of the best games of his career scoring 2 goals and 4 assists in a 8-2 Bruins win. Bucyk would later match this performance during a game on February 25, 1971, vs. Vancouver where he scored 3 goals and 3 assists in a 8-3 Bruins victory. Additionally he recorded a career high 5 assists on New Year's Day 1971 vs. Buffalo. Bucyk finished the year with his best statistical season, appearing in 78 games Bucyk scored career highs in goals (51) assists (65) and points with 116 making him the 5th player in league history to score 50 goals (on March 16, 1971) and the 5th to score 100 points (on March 13, 1971). He was named to play in his seventh All-Star Game, and further honored by being named as the league's First Team All-Star along with being awarded his first Lady Byng Memorial Trophy as the league's most gentlemanly player. At age 35, he was the oldest player in league history to score 50 goals (a record that stood until 2022 when broken by Alexander Ovechkin), broke the league record for assists and points by a left winger, and remains the oldest player ever to score 50 goals for the first time. He ultimately finished third in league scoring (behind Orr and Esposito), and second in goals and power-play goals. Among Boston's numerous records was having four hundred point scorers (Esposito, Orr, Bucyk, and Ken Hodge), the first time that had happened, only repeated by Edmonton in 1983, as well as finishing 1-2-3-4 in league scoring, also the first time that had happened, only repeated by the Bruins in 1974. Despite all of the accolades the Bruins were upset by the Montreal Canadiens in the first round 4-3.

The following year in 1971-72 Bucyk scoring had gone down but he was still a point per game scorer with 32 goals and 51 assists in 78 games, finishing eighth in league scoring. That year the Bruins finished with leagues best record once again. During the postseason Bucyk would appear in all 15 playoff games, putting up his best postseason statistics of his career with 9 goals and 11 assists for 20 points. The Bruins would defeat both Toronto and St Louis to reach the 1972 Stanley Cup Final where they defeated the New York Rangers 4-2 to win their second cup in 3 years.

He would remain a star for most of the 1970s, and would have another tremendous season the following year in 1972-73. During a game vs the Detroit Red Wings on November 9, 1972 Bucyk would score his 1,000 career point, it was goal in the second period. He became just the 7th player in league history to achieve the milestone. During Boston's January 18, 1973, game vs. the Islanders Bucyk scored a career high 4 goals in a 9-7 defeat. That year Bucyk would finish just shy of 100 points, as he scored 40 goals and 53 assists in 78 appearances finishing 8th in league scoring. The Bruins were then upset by New York in the first round of the playoffs

Bucyk started off the 1973-74 season by being named team captain for a second time, a title he would hold till his retirement. On January 5, 1974 during a game vs. the New York Islanders Bucky at the age of 38 became the oldest player to score 4 goals in a game in a 6-2 Bruins victory. On the year Bucyk averaged nearly a point per game during scoring 31 goals and 44 assists in 76 games, The Bruins finished with the leagues best record that year. Just like previous years Bucyk had a strong postseason scoring 18 points (8 goals and 10 assists) in 16 games helping the Bruins make yet another deep postseason run. However they were defeated by the Philadelphia Flyers in the 1974 Stanley Cup Final, 4-2. At the end of the year Bucyk would then once again win the Lady Byng Trophy, only having 8 penalty minutes on the year.

At the start of the 1974-75 season Bucyk was in his late 30s despite being in the twilight of his career his still remained and effective scorer which he proved when he scored 81 points 29 goals and 52 assists in 78 appearances throughout the year. However the Bruins were first round exits in the postseason. At the start of the 1975-76 Bucky scored his 500th career goal on October 30, 1975, in a Bruins 3-2 victory over St Louis, becoming just the fifth player in league history to achieve the feat. Later on in the season during a game vs. Los Angeles on March 3, 1976, Bucyk scored his final career hat trick at the age of 40 making him one of only 5 players to score a hat trick at 40+ years old. He finished the year with another 80+ point season, scoring 36 goals and 47 assists in 77 games. Bucyk is only one of 3 players in NHL history to score 30+ goals at 40 years of age or older. Bucyk scored 7 points in the postseason as the Bruins reached the semifinals where they were defeated by the Flyers.

In Bucyk's last two seasons his missed a handful of time due to back and hip injuries. During the 1976-77 season he only appeared in 49 games despite this he still had a 20 goal season along with 23 assists. The Bruins made it all the way to the 1977 Stanley Cup Finals that year however Bucyk only appeared in 5 postseason games. In 1977, he was awarded the Lester Patrick Trophy for contributions to hockey in the United States. He made a comeback his final year in 1977-78 appearing in 53 games scoring 5 goals and 13 assists. However he missed the rest of the season and playoffs due to his hip injury and retired at the age of 42 putting an end to his 23 year long career.

== Retirement and legacy ==
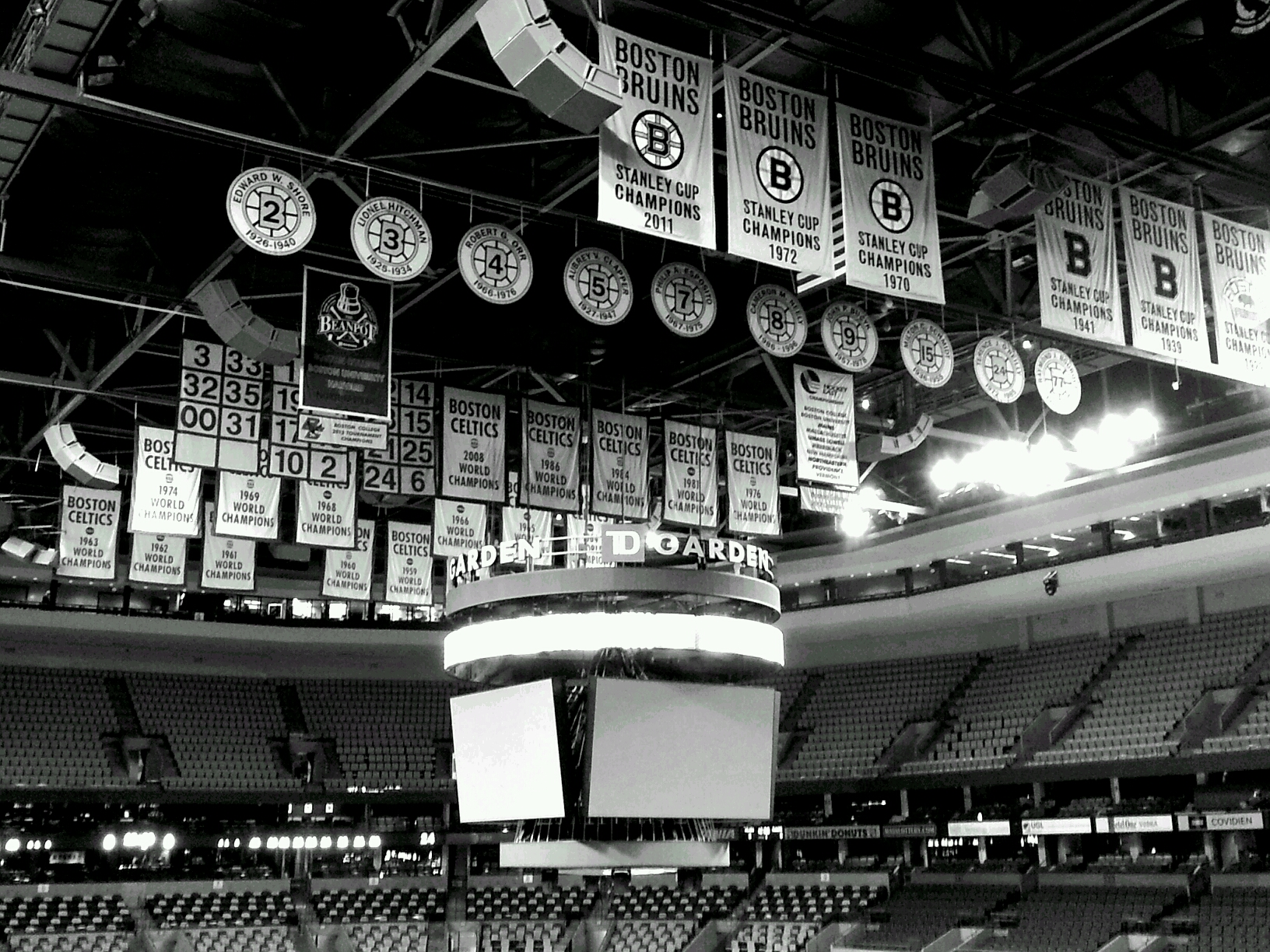
Player numbers retired by the Bruins hoisted at the TD Garden rafters. Bucyk's number was retired with the club in 1980.

Bucyk starred into his penultimate season (during which he surrendered his team captaincy, while suffering an injury, to Wayne Cashman), and ended his playing career after the 1978 season, after which the Bruins held a retirement ceremony for him on March 13, 1980 and retired his number #9.

At the time of his retirement, Bucyk was fourth all-time in points (behind Gordie Howe, Esposito and Stan Mikita) (currently 28th) and in goals (currently 27th), third in games played behind Howe and Alex Delvecchio (currently 17th), and was the leading career point scorer among left wings, a record since surpassed by Luc Robitaille.

Harry Sinden, the Hall of Fame coach, and former general manager and president of the Bruins. Would later describe Bucyk "as the most dangerous winger he's ever seen when in front of the net. Hall of fame goalie Tony Esposito, often quipped that Bucyk was like the scary butler Lurch from "The Addams Family" television series of the 1960s because he'd suddenly appear in the slot, seemingly from out of nowhere.

During Bucyk's time with the Bruins he scored 545 career goals, 794 assists, and registered 1339 career points His 1436 games played is second only to Ray Bourque in Bruins' history. His 88 game-winning goals is also a Bruins' record. In the playoffs, Bucyk was just as effective, collecting 100 points in only 109 games. His 45 power play points place him at number three all-time for Boston, behind only Ray Bourque and Brad Marchand. His 545 goals as a Bruin, remains the most in franchise history. Only Ray Bourque has subsequently passed his team marks for points and assists. He had 16 seasons of 20 or more goals, seven seasons with 30 or more goals. Bucyk was also known for his ability to score during the postseason scoring 103 points in 124 games. Despite large frame and signature hip checks often putting opponents Bucyk was known as one of the leagues cleanest players only spending 493 minutes in penalty box.

Bobby Orr credited Bucyk's leadership in his 2013 autobiography writing "Johnny was a great help to me making the transition from junior hockey to the pros," "He came to work every day and set the standard with his level of play. He always set the bar high for us, and it made you want to follow suit and set your own example for others. There can be no doubt that his leadership was a key part of the success the Bruins would enjoy in the years that followed." Bucyk is also known for taking up and coming Bruins players under his wing such as Cam Neely. During Joe Thornton's 2025 Hockey Hall of Fame speech he gave credit to Bucyk stating during his early, difficult years in Boston, "no one was bigger" helping him get through it.

Bucyk received numerous honors after his retirement. He was inducted into the Hockey Hall of Fame in 1981. Then being indicted into the Alberta Sports Hall of Fame in 1996. In 1998, he was ranked number 45 on The Hockey News' list of the 100 Greatest Hockey Players. In 2017, Bucyk was part of the first group of players to be named one of the '100 Greatest NHL Players' in history by the National Hockey League. The Athletic also named Bucyk to their list of the 100 greatest hockey players in 2023. Among the Bruins' team awards is the John P. Bucyk Award, presented each year to the Bruins player who provides exceptional off-ice charitable contributions. There is a hockey arena named in his honor in Creston British Columbia.

In 2004 Bucyk was honored by the Sports museums tradition event at the TD garden as a member of that year's class. Also being given the hockey legacy award. Since Bucyk has been a regular at the event and has started to be the one that presents the award to the recipients.

Bucyk remains affiliated with the Bruins, first serving color analyst for the team's flagship radio station for fourteen years from 1980 to 1995 alongside Bob Wilson and in the front office. He previously co-managed the team's public and media relations and later served as their director of road services coordinator, performing acts such as streamlining travel to and from airports, reserving restaurant tables when none existed along with other acts. He is now listed by the team as an ambassador, being known as the "unofficial mayor of TD Garden". As part of Boston's coaching and administrative staff, Bucyk had his name engraved on the Stanley Cup for a third time with the Bruins in 2011, his 53rd consecutive season with the organization. As of the 2025 season, Bucyk's 71 years in professional hockey is the longest such tenure on record. He once stated "I don't know what I'd do if I didn't still work for the Bruins," "I'm very honored." To this day he still remains one of the most beloved figures in Bruins history and attends almost every Bruins game.

During a game in 2007 the Bruins held Hail to the Chief night at the TD Garden. To celebrate Bucyk's 50th year as a member of the team. Before the game Bucyk stood at center ice and gave a speech to the Bruins fans with many of his former teammates by his side.

Bucyk was inducted into the Ukrainian Sports hall of fame in 2017. His uke line teammates would later be inducted in subsequent years.

In 2022 Bucyk served as the parade marshal for the Thanksgiving day celebrations in Plymouth, also honoring the 50 anniversary of the 1972 Bruins team.

He has dropped the ceremonial puck at numerous times at Bruins home games, most recently alongside Bobby Orr during the 2023 NHL winter classic at Fenway park. He was honored during the Bruins centennial celebrations in 2024, being Named to the Boston Bruins All-Centennial Team.

On May 12th 2025 the Bruins held a special event at the TD garden to celebrate Bucyk's 90th birthday. The event seen Bucyk's family and numerous Bruins players from the past and present all come together for the celebration.

== Personal life ==
His nephew Randy Bucyk played for the Northeastern University Huskies, and the Montreal Canadiens and Calgary Flames organizations, earning a Stanley Cup ring with Montreal in 1986. Randy Bucyk also played for the Canadian national team in 1989. Bucyk also played with his older brother William Bucyk, a defenseman for the Oil Kings who played several seasons in the minor league Western Hockey League in the late 1950s.

Bucyk was married to his wife Anne for 53 years. She died in 2012. The couple had three children together, Jo-Anne, Michael, and Larry. He also has eight grandchildren, and resides in Boxford where he enjoys playing golf. He also owns a summer property near Kootenay Lake in British Columbia.

Bucyk has also been involved in numerous charitable activities being regarded as one of the Boston most generous sports figures with regards to charitable work he has raised millions of dollars for causes such as the Heart Foundation and the Children's Glaucoma Foundation. In regards to his kind nature, Bruins owner Jeremy Jacobs once stated "It's often been said that if any of us wanted an elephant, Johnny Bucyk would get it for us." Bucyk has also regularly made visits to hospitals in the Boston area to greet children and their families.

Bucyk served as the state chairman for the American Heart association (AHA) for over 20 years. In 1992 he received the Paul Dudley White Award for his significant contributions to the field of cardiovascular health.

In 2023, the 200 Foundation (a Massachusetts-based charity organization) named Bucyk their Honoree of the year, for his consistent contributions to charity and local organizations in Massachusetts. In addition, the Bay State Brewing company made a limited edition "Johnny Bucyk #9 Beer", with the proceeds going to the charity.

== Career statistics ==
=== Regular season and playoffs ===
- **Bold** indicates led league

			Regular season					Playoffs
Season	Team	League	GP	G	A	Pts	PIM	GP	G	A	Pts	PIM
1951–52	Edmonton Maple Leafs	AJHL	—	—	—	—	—	—	—	—	—	—
1951–52	Edmonton Oil Kings	WCJHL	—	—	—	—	—	1	0	0	0	0
1952–53	Edmonton Oil Kings	WCJHL	39	19	12	31	24	12	5	1	6	14
1953–54	Edmonton Oil Kings	WCJHL	33	29	38	67	38	21	28	17	45	30
1953–54	Edmonton Flyers	WHL	2	2	0	2	2	—	—	—	—	—
1953–54	Edmonton Oil Kings	M-Cup	—	—	—	—	—	14	14	10	24	10
1954–55	Edmonton Flyers	WHL	70	30	58	88	57	9	1	6	7	7
1954–55	Edmonton Flyers	Ed-Cup	—	—	—	—	—	7	2	3	5	22
1955–56	Detroit Red Wings	NHL	38	1	8	9	18	10	1	1	2	8
1955–56	Edmonton Flyers	WHL	6	0	0	0	9	—	—	—	—	—
1956–57	Detroit Red Wings	NHL	66	10	11	21	39	5	0	1	1	0
1957–58	Boston Bruins	NHL	68	21	31	52	57	12	0	4	4	16
1958–59	Boston Bruins	NHL	69	24	36	60	36	7	2	4	6	6
1959–60	Boston Bruins	NHL	56	16	36	52	26	—	—	—	—	—
1960–61	Boston Bruins	NHL	70	19	20	39	48	—	—	—	—	—
1961–62	Boston Bruins	NHL	67	20	40	60	32	—	—	—	—	—
1962–63	Boston Bruins	NHL	69	27	39	66	36	—	—	—	—	—
1963–64	Boston Bruins	NHL	62	18	36	54	36	—	—	—	—	—
1964–65	Boston Bruins	NHL	68	26	29	55	24	—	—	—	—	—
1965–66	Boston Bruins	NHL	63	27	30	57	12	—	—	—	—	—
1966–67	Boston Bruins	NHL	59	18	30	48	12	—	—	—	—	—
1967–68	Boston Bruins	NHL	72	30	39	69	8	3	0	2	2	0
1968–69	Boston Bruins	NHL	70	24	42	66	18	10	5	6	11	0
1969–70	Boston Bruins	NHL	76	31	38	69	13	14	11	8	19	2
1970–71	Boston Bruins	NHL	78	51	65	116	8	7	2	5	7	0
1971–72	Boston Bruins	NHL	78	32	51	83	4	15	**9**	11	20	6
1972–73	Boston Bruins	NHL	78	40	53	93	12	5	0	3	3	0
1973–74	Boston Bruins	NHL	76	31	44	75	8	16	8	10	18	4
1974–75	Boston Bruins	NHL	78	29	52	81	10	3	1	0	1	0
1975–76	Boston Bruins	NHL	77	36	47	83	20	12	2	7	9	0
1976–77	Boston Bruins	NHL	49	20	23	43	12	5	0	0	0	0
1977–78	Boston Bruins	NHL	53	5	13	18	4	—	—	—	—	—
NHL totals			1,540	556	813	1,369	493	124	41	62	103	42

Statistics via Hockey Reference

== Achievements and facts ==
- Abbott Cup champion 1954
- President's Cup champion (WHL Championship) in 1955 and was also named the leagues rookie of the year.
- Played in the NHL All-Star Game in 1955, 1963, 1964, 1965, 1968, 1970, 1971.
- Elizabeth C. Dufresne Trophy winner in 1963 and 1966
- Named to the NHL second All-Star team in 1968.
- Stanley Cup champion in 1970 and 1972 (as a player) and 2011 (as team road service coordinator)
- Won the Lady Byng Memorial Trophy in 1971 and 1974.
- Named to the NHL first All-Star team in 1971.
- In 1976 Bucyk won the Charlie Conacher Humanitarian Award for his outstanding contribution to humanitarian work.
- Won Lester Patrick Trophy for contributions to hockey in the United States in 1977.
- Known as the "Chief" due to presumed Native American looks by a mistaken Boston cartoonist.
- A Ukrainian Canadian and member of the "Uke" line with Bronco Horvath and Vic Stasiuk.
- When the Bruins ended their twenty-nine-year championship drought in 1970, Bucyk was given the honour of being the first player of the team to hoist the Stanley Cup around the Boston Garden, since he was the most senior Alternate Captain (the Bruins did not have a regular Captain wearing the "C" during these years).
- His nephew Randy Bucyk played for the Northeastern University Huskies and the Montreal Canadiens and Calgary Flames organizations, earning a Stanley Cup ring with Montreal in 1986. Randy Bucyk also played for the Canadian national team in 1989.
- Recorded sixteen twenty-goal seasons.
- Career leader in goals and consecutive games played for the Bruins; second to Ray Bourque in career games, assists, and points (retired as the overall leader in all of those categories).
- Retired third behind Gordie Howe and Alex Delvecchio in all-time NHL games played; currently 18th.
- Retired as the leading career point scorer among left wings, a record since surpassed by Luc Robitaille.
- Oldest player to score 50 goals in one season (51 goals in 1970–71) at age 35, a record that stood until Alexander Ovechkin broke it by doing the same at age 36 in 2021–22.
- Also oldest player scoring 50 or more for 1st time in career. (1970–71).
- Played the greatest number of NHL games before scoring 500 goals - 1,370.
- His #9 jersey number was retired by the Boston Bruins on March 13, 1980.
- Inducted into the Hockey Hall of Fame in 1981.
- Inducted into the Alberta Sports Hall of Fame in 1996.
- In 1998, he was ranked number 45 on The Hockey News' list of the 100 Greatest Hockey Players.
- Inducted into the Massachusetts hockey Hall of Fame in 2007.
- Inducted into the Alberta Hockey Hall of Fame in 2016.
- Inducted into the Ukrainian Sports hall of fame in 2017
- In January 2017, Bucyk was part of the first group of players to be named one of the '100 Greatest NHL Players' in history by the National Hockey League.
- In 2023 he was ranked number 96 on The Athletics list of the 100 greatest Hockey Players of all time.
- Named One of the Top 100 Best Bruins Players of all Time.
- Named to the Boston Bruins All-Centennial Team.

== See also ==
- List of NHL statistical leaders
- List of NHL players with 1,000 points
- List of NHL players with 500 goals
- List of NHL players with 50 goal seasons
- List of NHL players with 100 point seasons
- List of NHL players with 1,000 games played

Preceded by Leo Boivin	Boston Bruins captain 1966–67 & 1973–77	Succeeded by Wayne Cashman
Preceded by Phil Goyette	Winner of the Lady Byng Trophy; 1971	Succeeded by Jean Ratelle
Preceded by Gilbert Perreault	Winner of the Lady Byng Trophy; 1974	Succeeded by Marcel Dionne
