= George V. Brown =

American sports official

- Brown with the military
- Born: George Vincent Brown; October 21, 1880; Hopkinton, Massachusetts, U.S.
- Died: October 17, 1937 (aged 56)
- Occupation: Sports executive
- Known for: Boston Marathon, ice hockey

George Vincent Brown (October 21, 1880 – October 17, 1937) was an American sports official. He championed the development of various sports and sporting events in the United States, most notably the Boston Marathon and amateur ice hockey. From 1904 to 1936, Brown served the United States Olympic Team as a manager, official, and coach. In 1919, he became general manager of the Boston Arena, home to indoor track meets, boxing matches, and hockey games, among other events.

== Biography ==
He was born on October 21, 1880. He was the assistant manager at the 1920 Summer Olympics. He died on October 17, 1937.

== Boston Athletic Association and Boston Marathon ==
In 1899 Brown was hired as an assistant to the Boston Athletic Association (BAA) Athletic Director. For 33 years, from 1905 to 1937, Brown served as starter of the BAA's Boston Marathon, the oldest annually run marathon. For eleven of those years, he also managed the race.

From 1905 to 1921, Brown managed the Boston Athletic Association Indoor Games, and for over twenty years, served as the BAA Director of Athletics. In 1910 Brown started and managed an ice hockey team, and formed a football team for the BAA.

Brown also served on the BAA Governing Committee for 20 years, having transitioned from club employee to club member and leader.

== Ice hockey ==
During Brown's youth, ice hockey was in its infancy in the United States. In 1911, Brown formed and managed an amateur ice hockey team for the BAA, which played at the newly constructed Boston Arena.

Over the next two decades, Brown organized hockey events held at the Arena, including Canadian-American games and collegiate competitions. When the Arena burnt down in 1918, Brown persuaded its owner, Henry G. Lapham, to rebuild. Brown was then named general manager and promoted hockey as its major draw. In 1934 Lapham purchased the rival Garden, and named Brown as its general manager and vice president. When professional hockey was first introduced and its teams sought to play at Boston's rinks, Brown opposed, favoring amateur competition. He later accepted the professionals and promoted the Boston Bruins playing at the Boston Garden.

Brown served as athletic director at Boston University (BU) and in 1917, was instrumental in the creation of the school's first hockey team. The BU hockey team's annual Most Valuable Player award is named the George V. Brown Memorial Award, in his honor.

For the first 1924 Winter Olympics, Brown organized the U.S. Olympic Hockey team, with seven of the ten members coming from the BAA team. The team earned a silver medal.

Because of his contributions to the emerging field of hockey, in 1961, Brown was inducted into the International Hockey Hall of Fame in Toronto, Canada, as a Builder. He was also enshrined as a Builder by the United States Hockey Hall of Fame in Eveleth, Minnesota, in 1973.

== Olympics ==
In addition to organizing the 1924 U.S. Olympic Hockey team, Brown was a manager or U.S. Olympic Committee member from 1908 to 1920. He was the assistant track and field coach for the U.S. men's team in 1924, 1928, and 1936. For the 1932 games in Los Angeles, Brown served as an official. In January 1938, the United States Olympic Committee marked his death with a moment of silence.

== Other sports affiliations ==
As general manager of the Boston Arena and Boston Garden, Brown promoted all manner of sporting events including college hockey, indoor track and field, amateur boxing, wrestling, water follies, and figure skating, featuring Olympic star Sonja Henie.

In addition to his primary passions—ice hockey, track and field, and the Boston Marathon—Brown created a BAA football team. He also officiated football games, and was an officer in the New England Football Officials Association for a dozen years. Brown also served as a member of the amateur boxing committee and organized national amateur championships from 1905 to 1920. Rowing was another sport for which he was an advocate, and for fourteen years, Brown was secretary of the Boston Interscholastic Rowing Association.

Brown enlisted in the 6th division of the US Navy and was appointed as director of athletics for the 1st District during World War I. He designed an athletic competition, the Chariot Race, that allowed thousands of men to compete in teams of one hundred, first demonstrated on the Boston Common in 1917.

== Legacy ==
Brown lived in Hopkinton, Massachusetts throughout his life, married Elizabeth Gallagher, and had four sons and three daughters, who continued their father's pursuits.

His son, Walter A. Brown, assumed the general manager position at the Boston Garden upon his father's death. Walter A. Brown went on to become general manager of the Boston Bruins ice hockey team, and founding owner and general manager of the Boston Celtics men's professional basketball team. Like his father, Walter A. Brown was inducted into the hockey halls of fame, and in addition, was elected to the Basketball Hall of Fame. Walter also served as starter of the Boston marathon from 1938 to 1942, and held the post of BAA president for over twenty years.

Since 1905, for every year except one, a member of the Brown family has been the starter of the Boston Marathon. After George V. and Walter A., George V. Brown, Jr., started the race, from 1943 to 1980. Another son of George V., Thomas J. Brown, who was BAA president from 1982 to 1985, served as the starter for the race through 1989. Thomas Brown's wife, Rosalie, has started the wheelchair race. George V.'s grandson, Walter F. Brown, was the race's starter from 1990 to 2013. Beginning in 2014, Christina Whelton, George V.'s great-granddaughter, has served as the starter.

Like the Boston Marathon, many of the sporting events George V. Brown fostered, have continued for over a century.

In 2008, the Hopkinton Athletic Association commissioned sculptor Michael Alfano to create a statue honoring Brown. The bronze monument, "The Starter", was installed on the town common in 2009.
