= Don Awrey =

Canadian ice hockey player (born 1943)

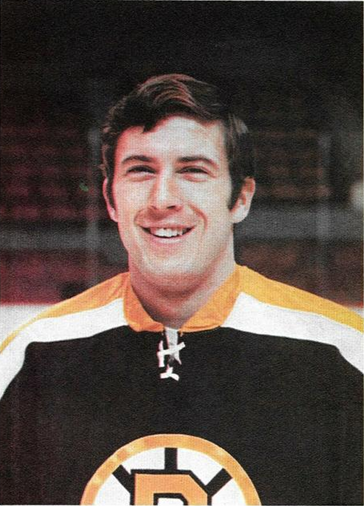
- Born: July 18, 1943 (age 83) Kitchener, Ontario, Canada
- Height: 6 ft 0 in (183 cm)
- Weight: 175 lb (79 kg; 12 st 7 lb)
- Position: Defence
- Shot: Left
- Played for: Boston Bruins; St. Louis Blues; Montreal Canadiens; Pittsburgh Penguins; New York Rangers; Colorado Rockies
- National team: Canada
- Playing career: 1960–1979

Donald William Awrey (born July 18, 1943) is a Canadian former professional hockey defenceman. He played 979 career National Hockey League (NHL) games with the Boston Bruins, St. Louis Blues, Montreal Canadiens, Pittsburgh Penguins, New York Rangers, and Colorado Rockies.

== Career ==
A native of Kitchener, Ontario while he was in high school Awrey found himself bed ridden due to suffering a career threatening back injury while playing football. He would overcome the injury after having surgery to fuse three vertebrae and being confined to a Stryker frame for three weeks.

A defensive defenceman, Awrey would play 3 seasons for the Niagara Falls Flyers of the OHA. During the 1962–63 season Awrey would play in 50 games accumulating 30 points, helping lead the flyers to the J. Ross Robertson Cup before eventually losing in Memorial Cup.

Awrey would then be signed by the Bruins for the 1963–64 season. Despite being an exceptionally fast skater, he rarely scored goals. He made his NHL debut in 1963–64 for the Bruins, his first of 16 seasons in the league. Awrey scored his first NHL goal on March 15, 1964 in Boston's 3-1 home win over Montreal. He would also spend time with the Bruins AHL and CPHL affiliates until making the Bruins for good in 1965-66.

Awrey would spend a majority of his career with the Boston Bruins. During his time with the Bruins Awrey was a stay-at-home defenseman often paired with Bobby Orr. He was known for his skating, shot-blocking and the hits he delivered cruising the blue line. Awrey was also a valuable member of the penalty kill being an overall solid defender. Despite his reputation on the ice, he's was known as a gentleman with an easy smile and a quick sense of humour. He would have his best statistical season in 1970–71 scoring 4 goals and tallying 21 assists. He was also a key part of two Stanley Cup winning teams with the Bruins, in 1970 and 1972. Awrey’s former teammate Johnny Bucyk described his play style stating "Don played very solid defensively. He blocked more shots than anyone I can recall. He was good at that, he moved the puck well and he wasn't afraid to go into the corners."

In 1972 Awrey was named to Team Canada for the Summit Series, playing in two of the eight games.

After his 10 years with the he would be traded to St. Louis Blues where he would spend the next 2 seasons. During his first season with the Blues he would play in the 1974 all star game. Awrey was then acquired by the Canadiens from the Blues for Chuck Lefley on November 28, 1974 in the middle of the 1974–75 season. He was a part of the Montreal Canadiens team that won the Stanley Cup in 1976, but did not play in any playoff games that season, and so does not have his name engraved on the cup for that year even though he qualified.

He was dealt from the Canadiens to the Penguins for a third-round selection in the 1978 NHL Amateur Draft (42nd overall–Richard David) and cash on August 11, 1976. After one season with the Penguins he would then spend a year with the New York Rangers during the 1977–78 season. His last season in the NHL was 1978–79, when he played for the Colorado Rockies. He now lives in Fort Myers, Florida.

In 2005 he was inducted into the Canada’s sports Hall of Fame for his time with team Canada in 1972.

In 2023 he would be named one of the top 100 Bruins players of all time.

== Retirement ==
In 2007 Awrey coached the club hockey team at Florida Coast university to a 18-2-2 record. However he was then fired. Stating “The kids got together and decided I was too old fashioned and to much of a disciplinarian and they got rid of me”. He would also continue to play hockey in a old timers league.

Even after retiring and moving to Florida Awrey stayed connected to the Bruins fan base. Since 2013 he has chartered buses full of Boston fans to attend Bruins games whenever the team travels south to play the Lightning or the Florida Panthers. In 2017 he coached an Alumni game between the Bruins and lightning.

He and his wife have been members of the Florida Everblades since the team inception in 1998. Both severing as off ice officials.

== Career statistics ==
=== Regular season and playoffs ===
			Regular season					Playoffs
Season	Team	League	GP	G	A	Pts	PIM	GP	G	A	Pts	PIM
1960–61	Waterloo Siskins	CJHL	—	—	—	—	—	—	—	—	—	—
1960–61	Niagara Falls Flyers	OHA-Jr.	3	0	0	0	11	—	—	—	—	—
1961–62	Niagara Falls Flyers	OHA-Jr.	41	6	12	18	90	10	0	3	3	15
1962–63	Niagara Falls Flyers	OHA-Jr.	50	7	23	30	111	9	4	9	13	29
1962–63	Niagara Falls Flyers	MC	—	—	—	—	—	16	4	8	12	58
1963–64	Boston Bruins	NHL	16	1	0	1	4	—	—	—	—	—
1963–64	Minneapolis Bruins	CPHL	54	4	15	19	136	5	0	0	0	9
1964–65	Boston Bruins	NHL	47	2	3	5	41	—	—	—	—	—
1964–65	Hershey Bears	AHL	23	2	4	6	38	15	0	1	1	29
1965–66	Boston Bruins	NHL	70	4	3	7	74	—	—	—	—	—
1966–67	Boston Bruins	NHL	4	1	0	1	6	—	—	—	—	—
1966–67	Hershey Bears	AHL	63	1	13	14	153	5	0	0	0	19
1967–68	Boston Bruins	NHL	74	3	12	15	153	4	0	1	1	4
1968–69	Boston Bruins	NHL	73	0	13	13	149	10	0	1	1	28
1969–70	Boston Bruins	NHL	73	3	10	13	120	14	0	5	5	32
1970–71	Boston Bruins	NHL	74	4	21	25	143	7	0	0	0	17
1971–72	Boston Braves	AHL	3	0	1	1	2	—	—	—	—	—
1971–72	Boston Bruins	NHL	34	1	8	9	52	15	0	4	4	45
1972–73	Boston Bruins	NHL	78	2	17	19	90	4	0	0	0	6
1973–74	St. Louis Blues	NHL	75	5	16	21	51	—	—	—	—	—
1974–75	St. Louis Blues	NHL	20	0	8	8	4	—	—	—	—	—
1974–75	Montreal Canadiens	NHL	56	1	11	12	58	11	0	6	6	12
1975–76	Montreal Canadiens	NHL	72	0	12	12	29	—	—	—	—	—
1976–77	Pittsburgh Penguins	NHL	79	1	12	13	40	3	0	1	1	0
1977–78	New York Rangers	NHL	78	2	8	10	38	3	0	0	0	6
1978–79	New Haven Nighthawks	AHL	6	2	1	3	6	—	—	—	—	—
1978–79	Colorado Rockies	NHL	56	1	4	5	18	—	—	—	—	—
NHL totals			979	31	158	189	1068	71	0	18	18	150

=== International ===
Year	Team	Event	GP	G	A	Pts	PIM
1972	Canada	SS	2	0	0	0	0

== Awards and achievements ==
- Stanley cup champion — (1970, 1972, 1976)
- Played in the 1974 NHL all star game
- Inducted into the Waterloo Region Hall of Fame in 1972
- Canada’s sports Hall of Fame (2005)
- In 2012 Awrey’s name was enshrined on the Canada walk of fame as a member of the 1972 Summit series team
- Named One of the Top 100 Best Bruins Players of all Time
