= Weston Adams Jr. =

American businessman

Weston Woollard "Westy" Adams Jr. (born October 18, 1944) is an American businessman who served as President of the Boston Bruins from March 31, 1969, to September 30, 1975.

== Boston Bruins ==
The son of Boston Bruins President Weston Adams and the grandson of team founder Charles Adams, Adams worked for the Bruins in various roles for many years until 1968, when he was named executive vice-president. On March 31, 1969, he succeeded his father as team president after Weston Sr.'s surprise resignation. The Bruins won two Stanley Cups (1970, 1972) during his first three seasons as President.

In 1973, the Adams family sold their shares in the Bruins to Storer Broadcasting, Inc. Storer allowed Adams to remain team president.

In 1975 the club was sold to Louis and Jeremy Jacobs, who chose to replace Adams as president.

== Sailing ==
In 1973, Adams co-founded Sailboats Northeast, a Marblehead, Massachusetts-based yacht brokerage business. He is a member and former director of the Yacht Architects and Brokers Association. An avid sailor, Adams won multiple New England Racing Championships between 1977 and 1982.

== Personal life ==
Adams currently resides in Marblehead. He is a former director of the Marblehead Chamber of Commerce.

Preceded by Weston Adams Sr.	President of the Boston Bruins; 1969–75	Succeeded by Paul A. Mooney
Preceded by Edward J. Powers	President of the Boston Garden; 1973–75	Succeeded by Paul A. Mooney
