= List of Boston Bruins award winners =

Boston Bruins awards
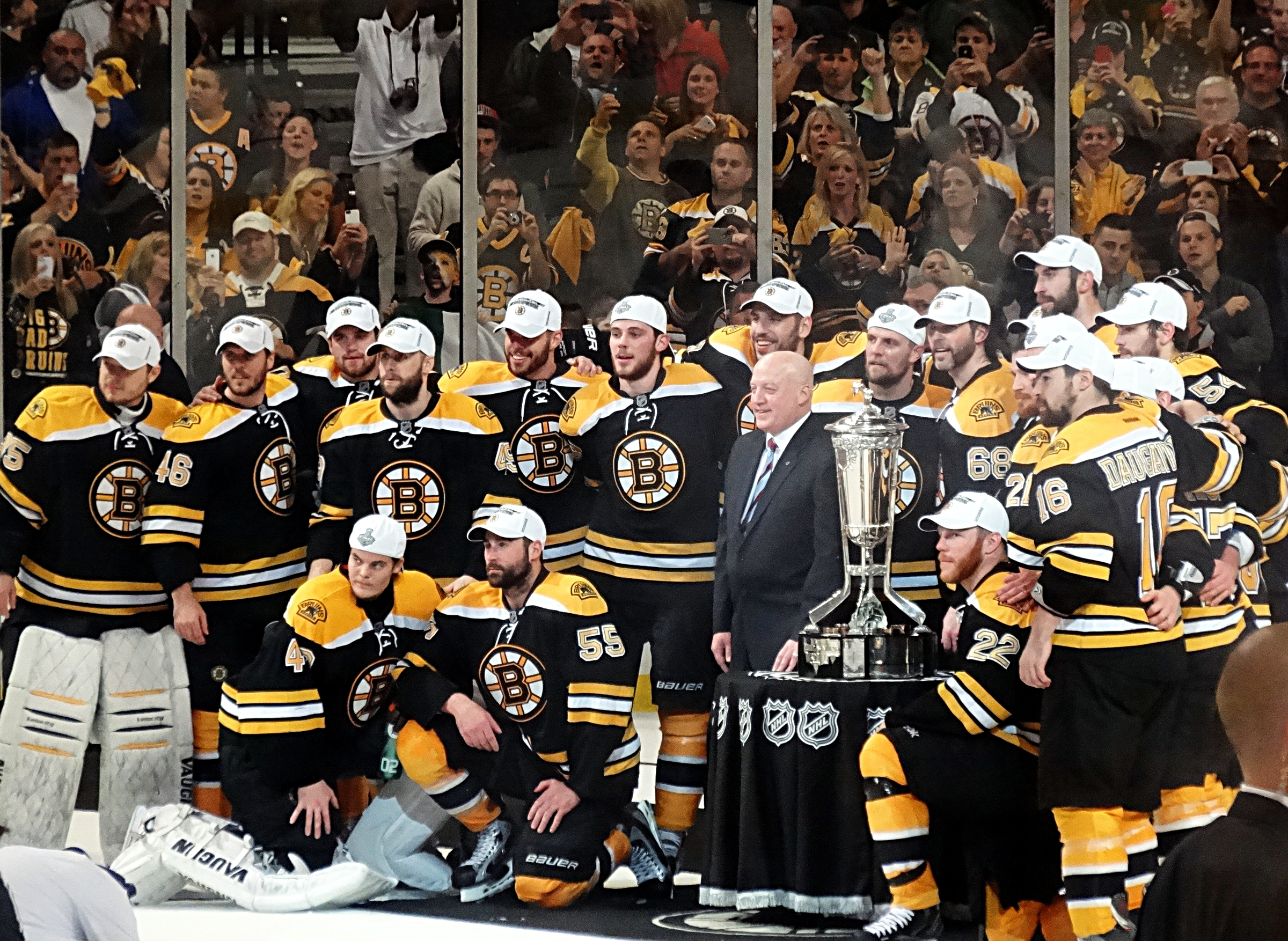
- The Boston Bruins are awarded the Prince of Wales Trophy in 2013.

Team trophies
- Award*: Wins
- Stanley Cup: 6
- Prince of Wales Trophy: 18
- Presidents' Trophy: 4
- O'Brien Trophy: 2

Individual awards
- Award*: Wins
- Art Ross Trophy: 11
- Bill Masterton Memorial Trophy: 4
- Calder Memorial Trophy: 8
- Charlie Conacher Memorial Trophy: 3
- Conn Smythe Trophy: 3
- Frank J. Selke Trophy: 7
- General Manager of the Year Award: 1
- Hart Memorial Trophy: 12
- Jack Adams Award: 5
- James Norris Memorial Trophy: 14
- King Clancy Memorial Trophy: 1
- Lady Byng Memorial Trophy: 8
- Lester Patrick Trophy: 13
- Mark Messier Leadership Award: 2
- Maurice "Rocket" Richard Trophy: 1
- NHL Foundation Player Award: 1
- Ted Lindsay Award: 3
- Vezina Trophy: 11
- William M. Jennings Trophy: 4

Total
- Awards won: 142

The Boston Bruins are a professional ice hockey team based in Boston. The Bruins compete in the National Hockey League (NHL) as a member of the Atlantic Division in the Eastern Conference. The team has been in existence since 1924, making them the third-oldest active team in the NHL.

The Bruins have won numerous team honors. The team has captured the O'Brien Cup as championship runner-ups in 1938 and 1950. They have achieved 18 Prince of Wales Trophies—seven as American Division champions, three as regular season champions, three as East Division champions, and five as Eastern Conference champions. They have won the Stanley Cup six times: in 1929, 1939, 1941, 1970, 1972, and 2011. They have won four Presidents' Trophies as regular season champions in four seasons—1989–90, 2013–14, 2019–20, and 2022–23.

The Bruins have also won many individual awards. Legendary defenseman Bobby Orr is the team's most decorated player, with eight James Norris Memorial Trophy wins, three Hart Memorial Trophy wins, two Conn Smythe Trophy wins, two Art Ross Trophy wins, a Calder Memorial Trophy win, and a Ted Lindsay Award, for a total of 17.

Thirteen players have had their numbers retired by the Bruins. Lionel Hitchman's number 3 was the first in 1934. Eddie Shore's number 2 and Dit Clapper's number were retired in 1947. Bobby Orr's number 4 was retired in 1979, followed by Milt Schmidt's number 15 and Johnny Bucyk's number 9 in 1980. Phil Esposito's number 7 was retired in 1987. Ray Bourque's 77 was retired in 2001, Terry O'Reilly's 24 was retired in 2002, and Cam Neely's number 8 was retired in 2004. Rick Middleton's number 16 was retired in 2018, Willie O'Ree's number 22 was retired in 2022, and Zdeno Chara's number 33 in 2026. 58 players have been inducted into the Hockey Hall of Fame following play with the Bruins. Players like Bourque, Esposito, and Orr have been inducted as players, while O'Ree and Charles Adams, first owner of the Bruins, have been inducted as builders.

Internally, the Bruins have five team awards. The Eddie Shore award is given to the player "demonstrating exceptional hustle and determination." The Elizabeth C. Dufresne Trophy is a given to the player who is "most outstanding in home games." The John P. Bucyk Award, is given for "charitable and community endeavors." The Seventh Player Award is given to the player who "performed beyond expectations." The Three Stars Award is given to the players with the most three stars of the game honors. They are all given out annually following the end of the season.

== League awards ==
=== Team trophies ===
Team trophies awarded to the Boston Bruins
Award	Description	Times won	Seasons	References
Stanley Cup	NHL championship	6	1928–29, 1938–39, 1940–41, 1969–70, 1971–72, 2010–11	
O'Brien Cup	NHL championship runner-up (1938–50)	2	1942–43, 1945–46	
Prince of Wales Trophy	American Division regular season champions (1927–38)	7	1927–28, 1928–29, 1929–30, 1930–31, 1932–33, 1934–35, 1937–38	
Prince of Wales Trophy	Regular season championship (1938–67)	3	1938–39, 1939–40, 1940–41	
Prince of Wales Trophy	East Division champions (1967–74)	3	1970–71, 1971–72, 1973–74	
Prince of Wales Trophy	Wales/Eastern Conference playoff championship (1981–present)	5	1987–88, 1989–90, 2010–11, 2012–13, 2018–19	
Presidents' Trophy	Most regular season points	4	1989–90, 2013–14, 2019–20, 2022–23	

=== Individual awards ===
Individual awards won by Boston Bruins players and staff
Award	Description	Winner	Season	References
Art Ross Trophy	Regular season scoring champion	Cooney Weiland	1929–30	
Art Ross Trophy	Regular season scoring champion	Milt Schmidt	1939–40	
Art Ross Trophy	Regular season scoring champion	Bill Cowley	1940–41	
Art Ross Trophy	Regular season scoring champion	Herb Cain	1943–44	
Art Ross Trophy	Regular season scoring champion	Phil Esposito	1968–69	
Art Ross Trophy	Regular season scoring champion	Phil Esposito	1970–71	
Art Ross Trophy	Regular season scoring champion	Phil Esposito	1971–72	
Art Ross Trophy	Regular season scoring champion	Phil Esposito	1972–73	
Art Ross Trophy	Regular season scoring champion	Phil Esposito	1973–74	
Art Ross Trophy	Regular season scoring champion	Bobby Orr	1969–70	
Art Ross Trophy	Regular season scoring champion	Bobby Orr	1974–75	
Art Ross Trophy	Regular season scoring champion	Joe Thornton	2005–06 (Note: Thornton was traded mid-season to the San Jose Sharks, but is recognized by the NHL as winning the trophy as playing for both teams, the only occasion in history where this has been the case.)	
Bill Masterton Memorial Trophy	Perseverance, sportsmanship and dedication to hockey	Charlie Simmer	1985–86	
Bill Masterton Memorial Trophy	Perseverance, sportsmanship and dedication to hockey	Gord Kluzak	1989–90	
Bill Masterton Memorial Trophy	Perseverance, sportsmanship and dedication to hockey	Cam Neely	1993–94	
Bill Masterton Memorial Trophy	Perseverance, sportsmanship and dedication to hockey	Phil Kessel	2006–07	
Calder Memorial Trophy	Rookie of the year	Frank Brimsek	1938–39	
Calder Memorial Trophy	Rookie of the year	Jack Gelineau	1949–50	
Calder Memorial Trophy	Rookie of the year	Larry Regan	1956–57	
Calder Memorial Trophy	Rookie of the year	Bobby Orr	1966–67	
Calder Memorial Trophy	Rookie of the year	Derek Sanderson	1967–68	
Calder Memorial Trophy	Rookie of the year	Ray Bourque	1979–80	
Calder Memorial Trophy	Rookie of the year	Sergei Samsonov	1997–98	
Calder Memorial Trophy	Rookie of the year	Andrew Raycroft	2003–04	
Conn Smythe Trophy	Most valuable player of the playoffs	Bobby Orr	1969–70	
Conn Smythe Trophy	Most valuable player of the playoffs	Bobby Orr	1971–72	
Conn Smythe Trophy	Most valuable player of the playoffs	Tim Thomas	2010–11	
Frank J. Selke Trophy	Forward who best excels in the defensive aspect of the game	Steve Kasper	1981–82	
Frank J. Selke Trophy	Forward who best excels in the defensive aspect of the game	Patrice Bergeron	2011–12	
Frank J. Selke Trophy	Forward who best excels in the defensive aspect of the game	Patrice Bergeron	2013–14	
Frank J. Selke Trophy	Forward who best excels in the defensive aspect of the game	Patrice Bergeron	2014–15	
Frank J. Selke Trophy	Forward who best excels in the defensive aspect of the game	Patrice Bergeron	2016–17	
Frank J. Selke Trophy	Forward who best excels in the defensive aspect of the game	Patrice Bergeron	2021–22	
Frank J. Selke Trophy	Forward who best excels in the defensive aspect of the game	Patrice Bergeron	2022–23	
Hart Memorial Trophy	Most valuable player to his team during the regular season	Eddie Shore	1932–33	
Hart Memorial Trophy	Most valuable player to his team during the regular season	Eddie Shore	1934–35	
Hart Memorial Trophy	Most valuable player to his team during the regular season	Eddie Shore	1935–36	
Hart Memorial Trophy	Most valuable player to his team during the regular season	Eddie Shore	1937–38	
Hart Memorial Trophy	Most valuable player to his team during the regular season	Bill Cowley	1940–41	
Hart Memorial Trophy	Most valuable player to his team during the regular season	Bill Cowley	1942–43	
Hart Memorial Trophy	Most valuable player to his team during the regular season	Milt Schmidt	1950–51	
Hart Memorial Trophy	Most valuable player to his team during the regular season	Phil Esposito	1968–69	
Hart Memorial Trophy	Most valuable player to his team during the regular season	Phil Esposito	1973–74	
Hart Memorial Trophy	Most valuable player to his team during the regular season	Bobby Orr	1969–70	
Hart Memorial Trophy	Most valuable player to his team during the regular season	Bobby Orr	1970–71	
Hart Memorial Trophy	Most valuable player to his team during the regular season	Bobby Orr	1971–72	
Jack Adams Award	Top coach during the regular season	Don Cherry	1975–76	
Jack Adams Award	Top coach during the regular season	Pat Burns	1997–98	
Jack Adams Award	Top coach during the regular season	Claude Julien	2008–09	
Jack Adams Award	Top coach during the regular season	Bruce Cassidy	2019–20	
Jack Adams Award	Top coach during the regular season	Jim Montgomery	2022–23	
James Norris Memorial Trophy	Top defenseman during the regular season	Bobby Orr	1967–68	
James Norris Memorial Trophy	Top defenseman during the regular season	Bobby Orr	1968–69	
James Norris Memorial Trophy	Top defenseman during the regular season	Bobby Orr	1969–70	
James Norris Memorial Trophy	Top defenseman during the regular season	Bobby Orr	1970–71	
James Norris Memorial Trophy	Top defenseman during the regular season	Bobby Orr	1971–72	
James Norris Memorial Trophy	Top defenseman during the regular season	Bobby Orr	1972–73	
James Norris Memorial Trophy	Top defenseman during the regular season	Bobby Orr	1973–74	
James Norris Memorial Trophy	Top defenseman during the regular season	Bobby Orr	1974–75	
James Norris Memorial Trophy	Top defenseman during the regular season	Ray Bourque	1986–87	
James Norris Memorial Trophy	Top defenseman during the regular season	Ray Bourque	1987–88	
James Norris Memorial Trophy	Top defenseman during the regular season	Ray Bourque	1989–90	
James Norris Memorial Trophy	Top defenseman during the regular season	Ray Bourque	1990–91	
James Norris Memorial Trophy	Top defenseman during the regular season	Ray Bourque	1993–94	
James Norris Memorial Trophy	Top defenseman during the regular season	Zdeno Chara	2008–09	
Jim Gregory General Manager of the Year Award	Top general manager	Don Sweeney	2018–19	
King Clancy Memorial Trophy	Leadership qualities on and off the ice and humanitarian contributions within their community	Patrice Bergeron	2012–13	
Lady Byng Memorial Trophy	Gentlemanly conduct	Bobby Bauer	1939–40	
Lady Byng Memorial Trophy	Gentlemanly conduct	Bobby Bauer	1940–41	
Lady Byng Memorial Trophy	Gentlemanly conduct	Bobby Bauer	1946–47	
Lady Byng Memorial Trophy	Gentlemanly conduct	Don McKenney	1959–60	
Lady Byng Memorial Trophy	Gentlemanly conduct	Johnny Bucyk	1970–71	
Lady Byng Memorial Trophy	Gentlemanly conduct	Johnny Bucyk	1973–74	
Lady Byng Memorial Trophy	Gentlemanly conduct	Johnny Bucyk	1975–76	
Lady Byng Memorial Trophy	Gentlemanly conduct	Rick Middleton	1981–82	
Mark Messier Leadership Award	Player who exemplifies leadership on and off the ice	Zdeno Chara	2010–11	
Mark Messier Leadership Award	Player who exemplifies leadership on and off the ice	Patrice Bergeron	2020–21	
Maurice "Rocket" Richard Trophy	Player with the most regular season goals (1998–present)	David Pastrnak	2019–20 (Note: Shared with Alexander Ovechkin of the Washington Capitals.)	
NHL Foundation Player Award	Community service	Patrice Bergeron	2013–14	
Ted Lindsay Award	Most valuable player as chosen by the players	Phil Esposito	1970–71	
Ted Lindsay Award	Most valuable player as chosen by the players	Phil Esposito	1972–73	
Ted Lindsay Award	Most valuable player as chosen by the players	Bobby Orr	1974–75	
Vezina Trophy	Fewest goals given up in the regular season (1927–81)	Tiny Thompson	1929–30	
Vezina Trophy	Fewest goals given up in the regular season (1927–81)	Tiny Thompson	1932–33	
Vezina Trophy	Fewest goals given up in the regular season (1927–81)	Tiny Thompson	1935–36	
Vezina Trophy	Fewest goals given up in the regular season (1927–81)	Tiny Thompson	1937–38	
Vezina Trophy	Fewest goals given up in the regular season (1927–81)	Frank Brimsek	1938–39	
Vezina Trophy	Fewest goals given up in the regular season (1927–81)	Frank Brimsek	1941–42	
Vezina Trophy	Top goaltender (1981–present)	Pete Peeters	1982–83	
Vezina Trophy	Top goaltender (1981–present)	Tim Thomas	2008–09	
Vezina Trophy	Top goaltender (1981–present)	Tim Thomas	2010–11	
Vezina Trophy	Top goaltender (1981–present)	Tuukka Rask	2013–14	
Vezina Trophy	Top goaltender (1981–present)	Linus Ullmark	2022–23	
William M. Jennings Trophy	Fewest goals given up in the regular season (1981–present)	Reggie Lemelin	1989–90	
William M. Jennings Trophy	Fewest goals given up in the regular season (1981–present)	Andy Moog	1989–90	
William M. Jennings Trophy	Fewest goals given up in the regular season (1981–present)	Manny Fernandez	2008–09	
William M. Jennings Trophy	Fewest goals given up in the regular season (1981–present)	Tim Thomas	2008–09	
William M. Jennings Trophy	Fewest goals given up in the regular season (1981–present)	Jaroslav Halak	2019–20	
William M. Jennings Trophy	Fewest goals given up in the regular season (1981–present)	Tuukka Rask	2019–20	
William M. Jennings Trophy	Fewest goals given up in the regular season (1981–present)	Jeremy Swayman	2022–23	
William M. Jennings Trophy	Fewest goals given up in the regular season (1981–present)	Linus Ullmark	2022–23	

== All-Stars ==
=== NHL First and Second Team All-Stars ===
The NHL First and Second Team All-Stars are the top players at each position as voted on by the Professional Hockey Writers' Association.

Boston Bruins selected to the NHL First and Second Team All-Stars
Player	Position	Selections	Season	Team
Bobby Bauer	Right Wing	4	1938–39	2nd
Bobby Bauer	Right Wing	4	1939–40	2nd
Bobby Bauer	Right Wing	4	1940–41	2nd
Bobby Bauer	Right Wing	4	1946–47	2nd
Ray Bourque	Defense	18	1979–80	1st
Ray Bourque	Defense	18	1980–81	2nd
Ray Bourque	Defense	18	1981–82	1st
Ray Bourque	Defense	18	1982–83	2nd
Ray Bourque	Defense	18	1983–84	1st
Ray Bourque	Defense	18	1984–85	1st
Ray Bourque	Defense	18	1985–86	2nd
Ray Bourque	Defense	18	1986–87	1st
Ray Bourque	Defense	18	1987–88	1st
Ray Bourque	Defense	18	1988–89	2nd
Ray Bourque	Defense	18	1989–90	1st
Ray Bourque	Defense	18	1990–91	1st
Ray Bourque	Defense	18	1991–92	1st
Ray Bourque	Defense	18	1992–93	1st
Ray Bourque	Defense	18	1993–94	1st
Ray Bourque	Defense	18	1994–95	2nd
Ray Bourque	Defense	18	1995–96	1st
Ray Bourque	Defense	18	1998–99	2nd
Frank Brimsek	Goaltender	8	1938–39	1st
Frank Brimsek	Goaltender	8	1939–40	2nd
Frank Brimsek	Goaltender	8	1940–41	2nd
Frank Brimsek	Goaltender	8	1941–42	1st
Frank Brimsek	Goaltender	8	1942–43	2nd
Frank Brimsek	Goaltender	8	1945–46	2nd
Frank Brimsek	Goaltender	8	1946–47	2nd
Frank Brimsek	Goaltender	8	1947–48	2nd
Johnny Bucyk	Left Wing	2	1967–68	2nd
Johnny Bucyk	Left Wing	2	1970–71	1st
Herb Cain	Left Wing	1	1943–44	2nd
Wayne Cashman	Left Wing	1	1973–74	2nd
Zdeno Chara	Defense	5	2007–08	2nd
Zdeno Chara	Defense	5	2008–09	1st
Zdeno Chara	Defense	5	2010–11	2nd
Zdeno Chara	Defense	5	2011–12	2nd
Zdeno Chara	Defense	5	2013–14	1st
Real Chevrefils	Left Wing	1	1956–57	2nd
Dit Clapper	Right Wing	6	1930–31	2nd
Dit Clapper	Right Wing	6	1934–35	2nd
Dit Clapper	Defense	6	1938–39	1st
Dit Clapper	Defense	6	1939–40	1st
Dit Clapper	Defense	6	1940–41	1st
Dit Clapper	Defense	6	1943–44	2nd
Bill Cowley	Center	5	1937–38	1st
Bill Cowley	Center	5	1940–41	1st
Bill Cowley	Center	5	1942–43	1st
Bill Cowley	Center	5	1943–44	1st
Bill Cowley	Center	5	1944–45	2nd
Jack Crawford	Defense	2	1935–36	1st
Jack Crawford	Defense	2	1942–43	2nd
Byron Dafoe	Goaltender	1	1998–99	2nd
Woody Dumart	Left Wing	3	1939–40	2nd
Woody Dumart	Left Wing	3	1940–41	2nd
Woody Dumart	Left Wing	3	1946–47	2nd
Phil Esposito	Center	8	1967–68	2nd
Phil Esposito	Center	8	1968–69	1st
Phil Esposito	Center	8	1969–70	1st
Phil Esposito	Center	8	1970–71	1st
Phil Esposito	Center	8	1971–72	1st
Phil Esposito	Center	8	1972–73	1st
Phil Esposito	Center	8	1973–74	1st
Phil Esposito	Center	8	1974–75	2nd
Fernie Flaman	Defense	3	1954–55	2nd
Fernie Flaman	Defense	3	1956–57	2nd
Fernie Flaman	Defense	3	1957–58	2nd
Ted Green	Defense	1	1968–69	2nd
Bill Guerin	Right Wing	1	2001–02	2nd
Jim Henry	Goaltender	1	1951–52	2nd
Ken Hodge	Right Wing	2	1970–71	1st
Ken Hodge	Right Wing	2	1973–74	1st
Flash Hollett	Defense	1	1942–43	2nd
Bronco Horvath	Center	1	1959–60	2nd
Hampus Lindholm	Defense	1	2022–23	2nd
Fleming Mackell	Center	1	1952–53	1st
Brad Marchand	Left Wing	4	2016–17	1st
Brad Marchand	Left Wing	4	2018–19	2nd
Brad Marchand	Left Wing	4	2019–20	2nd
Brad Marchand	Left Wing	4	2020–21	1st
Charlie McAvoy	Defense	1	2021–22	2nd
John McKenzie	Right Wing	1	1969–70	2nd
Rick Middleton	Right Wing	1	1981–82	2nd
Cam Neely	Right Wing	4	1987–88	2nd
Cam Neely	Right Wing	4	1989–90	2nd
Cam Neely	Right Wing	4	1990–91	2nd
Cam Neely	Right Wing	4	1993–94	2nd
Bobby Orr	Defense	9	1966–67	2nd
Bobby Orr	Defense	9	1967–68	1st
Bobby Orr	Defense	9	1968–69	1st
Bobby Orr	Defense	9	1969–70	1st
Bobby Orr	Defense	9	1970–71	1st
Bobby Orr	Defense	9	1971–72	1st
Bobby Orr	Defense	9	1972–73	1st
Bobby Orr	Defense	9	1973–74	1st
Bobby Orr	Defense	9	1974–75	1st
Brad Park	Defense	2	1975–76	1st
Brad Park	Defense	2	1977–78	1st
David Pastrnak	Right Wing	5	2019–20	1st
David Pastrnak	Right Wing	5	2022–23	1st
David Pastrnak	Right Wing	5	2023–24	2nd
David Pastrnak	Right Wing	5	2024–25	2nd
David Pastrnak	Right Wing	5	2025–26	2nd
Pete Peeters	Goaltender	1	1982–83	1st
Bill Quackenbush	Defense	2	1950–51	1st
Bill Quackenbush	Defense	2	1952–53	2nd
Tuukka Rask	Goaltender	2	2013–14	1st
Tuukka Rask	Goaltender	2	2019–20	2nd
Art Ross	Coach	3	1937–38	2nd
Art Ross	Coach	3	1938–39	1st
Art Ross	Coach	3	1942–43	2nd
Ed Sandford	Left Wing	1	1953–54	2nd
Milt Schmidt	Center	4	1939–40	1st
Milt Schmidt	Center	4	1946–47	1st
Milt Schmidt	Center	4	1950–51	1st
Milt Schmidt	Center	4	1951–52	2nd
Eddie Shore	Defense	8	1930–31	1st
Eddie Shore	Defense	8	1931–32	1st
Eddie Shore	Defense	8	1932–33	1st
Eddie Shore	Defense	8	1933–34	2nd
Eddie Shore	Defense	8	1934–35	1st
Eddie Shore	Defense	8	1935–36	1st
Eddie Shore	Defense	8	1937–38	1st
Eddie Shore	Defense	8	1938–39	1st
Babe Siebert	Defense	1	1935–36	1st
Tim Thomas	Goaltender	2	2008–09	1st
Tim Thomas	Goaltender	2	2010–11	1st
Tiny Thompson	Goaltender	4	1930–31	2nd
Tiny Thompson	Goaltender	4	1934–35	2nd
Tiny Thompson	Goaltender	4	1935–36	1st
Tiny Thompson	Goaltender	4	1937–38	1st
Joe Thornton	Center	1	2002–03	2nd
Linus Ullmark	Goaltender	1	2022–23	1st
Cooney Weiland	Coach	1	1940–41	1st

=== NHL All-Rookie Team ===
The NHL All-Rookie Team (first named in 1983) consists of the top rookies at each position as voted on by the Professional Hockey Writers' Association.

Boston Bruins selected to the NHL All-Rookie Team
Player	Position	Season
Brad Boyes	Forward	2005–06
Nick Boynton	Defense	2001–02
Ken Hodge Jr.	Forward	1990–91
Joe Juneau	Forward	1992–93
Torey Krug	Defense	2013–14
Charlie McAvoy	Defense	2017–18
Kyle McLaren	Defense	1995–96
Andrew Raycroft	Goaltender	2003–04
Sergei Samsonov	Forward	1997–98
Jeremy Swayman	Goaltender	2021–22
Glen Wesley	Defense	1987–88

=== All-Star Game selections ===
The National Hockey League All-Star Game is a mid-season exhibition game held annually between many of the top players of each season. Sixty-four All-Star Games have been held since 1947, with at least one player chosen to represent the Bruins in each year. The All-Star game has not been held in various years: 1979 and 1987 due to the 1979 Challenge Cup and Rendez-vous '87 series between the NHL and the Soviet national team, respectively, 1995, 2005, and 2013 as a result of labor stoppages, 2006, 2010, 2014 and 2026 because of the Winter Olympic Games, 2021 as a result of the COVID-19 pandemic, and 2025 when it was replaced by the 2025 4 Nations Face-Off. Boston has hosted two of the games. The 24th took place at the Boston Garden and 46th took place at TD Garden, then known as the FleetCenter.

- † Selected by fan vote
- ↑ All-Star Game Most Valuable Player

Boston Bruins players and coaches selected to the All-Star Game
Game	Year	Name	Position	References
1st	1947	Bobby Bauer	Right Wing	
1st	1947	Frank Brimsek	Goaltender	
1st	1947	Woody Dumart	Left Wing	
1st	1947	Milt Schmidt	Center	
2nd	1948	Frank Brimsek	Goaltender	
2nd	1948	Woody Dumart	Left Wing	
2nd	1948	Milt Schmidt	Center	
3rd	1949	Bill Quackenbush	Defense	
3rd	1949	Paul Ronty	Center	
4th	1950	Lynn Patrick	Coach	
4th	1950	Johnny Peirson	Right Wing	
4th	1950	Bill Quackenbush	Defense	
4th	1950	Paul Ronty	Center	
5th	1951	Johnny Peirson	Right Wing	
5th	1951	Bill Quackenbush	Defense	
5th	1951	Ed Sandford	Left Wing	
5th	1951	Milt Schmidt	Center	
6th	1952	Dave Creighton	Center	
6th	1952	Jim Henry	Goaltender	
6th	1952	Bill Quackenbush	Defense	
6th	1952	Ed Sandford	Left Wing	
6th	1952	Milt Schmidt	Center	
7th	1953	Lynn Patrick	Coach	
7th	1953	Bill Quackenbush	Defense	
7th	1953	Ed Sandford	Left Wing	
8th	1954	Fleming Mackell	Center	
8th	1954	Doug Mohns	Defense	
8th	1954	Bill Quackenbush	Defense	
8th	1954	Ed Sandford	Left Wing	
9th	1955	Fernie Flaman	Defense	
9th	1955	Leo Labine	Right Wing	
9th	1955	Terry Sawchuk	Goaltender	
10th	1956	Fernie Flaman	Defense	
10th	1956	Leo Labine	Right Wing	
10th	1956	Terry Sawchuk	Goaltender	
11th	1957	Real Chevrefils	Left Wing	
11th	1957	Fernie Flaman	Defense	
11th	1957	Don McKenney	Center	
11th	1957	Milt Schmidt	Coach	
11th	1957	Allan Stanley	Defense	
12th	1958	Fernie Flaman	Defense	
12th	1958	Don McKenney	Center	
12th	1958	Doug Mohns	Defense	
12th	1958	Milt Schmidt	Coach	
12th	1958	Jerry Toppazzini	Right Wing	
13th	1959	Fernie Flaman	Defense	
13th	1959	Don McKenney	Center	
13th	1959	Doug Mohns	Defense	
13th	1959	Jerry Toppazzini	Right Wing	
14th	1960	Bob Armstrong	Defense	
14th	1960	Bronco Horvath	Defense	
14th	1960	Don McKenney	Center	
14th	1960	Vic Stasiuk	Left Wing	
15th	1961	Leo Boivin	Defense	
15th	1961	Don McKenney	Center	
15th	1961	Doug Mohns	Defense	
16th	1962	Leo Boivin	Defense	
16th	1962	Don McKenney	Center	
16th	1962	Doug Mohns	Defense	
17th	1963	Johnny Bucyk	Left Wing	
17th	1963	Tom Johnson	Defense	
17th	1963	Murray Oliver	Center	
17th	1963	Dean Prentice	Left Wing	
18th	1964	Leo Boivin	Defense	
18th	1964	Johnny Bucyk	Left Wing	
18th	1964	Murray Oliver	Center	
19th	1965	Johnny Bucyk	Left Wing	
19th	1965	Ted Green	Defense	
19th	1965	Murray Oliver	Center	
20th	1967	Murray Oliver	Center	
21st	1968	Johnny Bucyk	Left Wing	
21st	1968	Bobby Orr	Defense	
22nd	1969	Gerry Cheevers	Goaltender	
22nd	1969	Phil Esposito	Center	
22nd	1969	Ted Green	Defense	
22nd	1969	Bobby Orr	Defense	
23rd	1970	Johnny Bucyk	Left Wing	
23rd	1970	Phil Esposito	Center	
23rd	1970	John McKenzie	Right Wing	
23rd	1970	Bobby Orr	Defense	
24th	1971	Johnny Bucyk	Left Wing	
24th	1971	Phil Esposito	Center	
24th	1971	Ken Hodge	Right Wing	
24th	1971	Bobby Orr	Defense	
24th	1971	Harry Sinden	Coach	
24th	1971	Dallas Smith	Defense	
24th	1971	Ed Westfall	Right Wing	
25th	1972	Phil Esposito	Center	
25th	1972	John McKenzie	Right Wing	
25th	1972	Bobby Orr↑	Defense	
25th	1972	Dallas Smith	Defense	
26th	1973	Phil Esposito	Center	
26th	1973	Ken Hodge	Right Wing	
26th	1973	Tom Johnson	Coach	
26th	1973	Bobby Orr	Defense	
26th	1973	Dallas Smith	Defense	
27th	1974	Wayne Cashman	Left Wing	
27th	1974	Phil Esposito	Center	
27th	1974	Gilles Gilbert	Goaltender	
27th	1974	Ken Hodge	Right Wing	
27th	1974	Dallas Smith	Defense	
28th	1975	Phil Esposito	Center	
28th	1975	Terry O'Reilly	Right Wing	
28th	1975	Bobby Orr	Defense	
28th	1975	Carol Vadnais	Defense	
29th	1976	Brad Park	Defense	
29th	1976	Gregg Sheppard	Center	
30th	1977	Peter McNab	Center	
30th	1977	Brad Park	Defense	
31st	1978	Terry O'Reilly	Right Wing	
31st	1978	Brad Park	Defense	
32nd	1980	Jean Ratelle	Center	
33rd	1981	Ray Bourque	Defense	
33rd	1981	Rick Middleton	Right Wing	
34th	1982	Ray Bourque	Defense	
34th	1982	Rick Middleton	Right Wing	
35th	1983	Ray Bourque	Defense	
35th	1983	Barry Pederson	Center	
35th	1983	Pete Peeters	Goaltender	
36th	1984	Ray Bourque	Defense	
36th	1984	Rick Middleton	Right Wing	
36th	1984	Mike O'Connell	Defense	
36th	1984	Barry Pederson	Center	
36th	1984	Pete Peeters	Goaltender	
37th	1985	Ray Bourque	Defense	
38th	1986	Ray Bourque†	Defense	
39th	1988	Ray Bourque†	Defense	
39th	1988	Cam Neely	Right Wing	
40th	1989	Ray Bourque†	Defense	
40th	1989	Rejean Lemelin	Goaltender	
40th	1989	Cam Neely†	Right Wing	
40th	1989	Terry O'Reilly	Coach	
40th	1989	Glen Wesley	Defense	
41st	1990	Ray Bourque†	Defense	
41st	1990	Cam Neely†	Right Wing	
42nd	1991	Ray Bourque†	Defense	
42nd	1991	Dave Christian	Right Wing	
42nd	1991	Garry Galley	Defense	
42nd	1991	Mike Milbury	Coach	
42nd	1991	Andy Moog	Goaltender	
42nd	1991	Cam Neely†	Right Wing	
43rd	1992	Ray Bourque†	Defense	
44th	1993	Ray Bourque†	Defense	
44th	1993	Adam Oates	Center	
45th	1994	Ray Bourque†	Defense	
45th	1994	Adam Oates	Center	
46th	1996	Ray Bourque†↑	Defense	
46th	1996	Cam Neely	Right Wing	
47th	1997	Ray Bourque†	Defense	
47th	1997	Adam Oates	Center	
48th	1998	Ray Bourque†	Defense	
49th	1999	Ray Bourque†	Defense	
49th	1999	Dmitri Khristich	Left Wing	
50th	2000	Ray Bourque	Defense	
51st	2001	Jason Allison	Center	
51st	2001	Bill Guerin↑	Right Wing	
51st	2001	Sergei Samsonov	Left Wing	
52nd	2002	Joe Thornton	Center	
53rd	2003	Glen Murray	Right Wing	
53rd	2003	Joe Thornton	Center	
54th	2004	Nick Boynton	Defense	
54th	2004	Glen Murray	Right Wing	
54th	2004	Joe Thornton†	Center	
55th	2007	Zdeno Chara	Defense	
56th	2008	Zdeno Chara†	Defense	
56th	2008	Marc Savard	Center	
56th	2008	Tim Thomas	Goaltender	
57th	2009	Zdeno Chara	Defense	
57th	2009	Marc Savard	Center	
57th	2009	Tim Thomas	Goaltender	
57th	2009	Claude Julien	Coach	
58th	2011	Zdeno Chara	Defense	
58th	2011	Tim Thomas	Goaltender	
59th	2012	Zdeno Chara	Defense	
59th	2012	Tyler Seguin	Center	
59th	2012	Tim Thomas†	Goaltender	
59th	2012	Claude Julien	Coach	
60th	2015	Patrice Bergeron	Center	
61st	2016	Patrice Bergeron	Center	
62nd	2017	Brad Marchand	Left Wing	
62nd	2017	Tuukka Rask	Goaltender	
63rd	2018	Brad Marchand	Left Wing	
64th	2019	David Pastrnak	Right Wing	
65th	2020	Bruce Cassidy	Coach	
65th	2020	David Pastrnak†↑	Right Wing	
65th	2020	Tuukka Rask (Did not play)	Goaltender	
66th	2022	Patrice Bergeron	Center	
67th	2023	Jim Montgomery	Coach	
67th	2023	David Pastrnak†	Right Wing	
67th	2023	Linus Ullmark	Goaltender	
68th	2024	Jim Montgomery	Coach	
68th	2024	David Pastrnak	Right Wing	
68th	2024	Jeremy Swayman†	Goaltender	

=== All-Star benefit games ===
Prior to the institution of the National Hockey League All-Star Game the league held three different benefit games featuring teams of all-stars. The first was the Ace Bailey Benefit Game, held in 1934, after a violent collision with Boston's Eddie Shore left Ace Bailey of the Toronto Maple Leafs hospitalized and unable to continue his playing career. In 1937 the Howie Morenz Memorial Game was held to raise money for the family of Howie Morenz of the Montreal Canadiens who died from complications after being admitted to the hospital for a broken leg. The Babe Siebert Memorial Game was held in 1939 to raise funds for the family of the Canadiens' Babe Siebert who drowned shortly after he retired from playing.

Boston Bruins players and coaches selected to All-Star benefit games
Game	Year	Name	Position	References
Ace Bailey Benefit Game	1934	Eddie Shore	Defense	
Ace Bailey Benefit Game	1934	Nels Stewart	Center	
Howie Morenz Memorial Game	1937	Dit Clapper	Defense	
Howie Morenz Memorial Game	1937	Eddie Shore	Defense	
Howie Morenz Memorial Game	1937	Tiny Thompson	Goaltender	
Babe Siebert Memorial Game	1939	Bobby Bauer	Right Wing	
Babe Siebert Memorial Game	1939	Frank Brimsek	Goaltender	
Babe Siebert Memorial Game	1939	Dit Clapper	Defense	
Babe Siebert Memorial Game	1939	Art Ross	Coach	
Babe Siebert Memorial Game	1939	Eddie Shore	Defense	

=== All-Star Game replacement events ===
Boston Bruins players and coaches selected to All-Star Game replacement events
Event	Year	Name	Position	References
Challenge Cup	1979	Gerry Cheevers	Goaltender	
Challenge Cup	1979	Don Marcotte	Left Wing	
Rendez-vous '87	1987	Ray Bourque	Defense	
4 Nations Face-Off	2025	Elias Lindholm (Sweden)	Center	
4 Nations Face-Off	2025	Brad Marchand (Canada)	Right Wing	
4 Nations Face-Off	2025	Charlie McAvoy (United States)	Defense	
4 Nations Face-Off	2025	Jeremy Swayman (United States)	Goaltender	

== Career achievements ==
=== Hockey Hall of Fame ===
The following is a list of Boston Bruins who have been enshrined in the Hockey Hall of Fame.

Boston Bruins inducted into the Hockey Hall of Fame
Individual	Category	Year inducted	Years with Bruins in category	References
Charles Adams	Builder	1960	1924–1936	
Weston Adams	Builder	1972	1936–1951, 1964–1969	
Dave Andreychuk	Player	2017	1999–2000	
Marty Barry	Player	1965	1929–1935	
Bobby Bauer	Player	1996	1935–1942, 1945–1947, 1951–1952	
Patrice Bergeron	Player	2026	2003-2023	
Leo Boivin	Player	1986	1954–1966	
Ray Bourque	Player	2004	1979–2000	
Frank Brimsek	Player	1966	1938–1949	
Walter Brown	Builder	1962	1951–1964	
Johnny Bucyk	Player	1981	1957–1978	
Billy Burch	Player	1974	1932–1933	
Pat Burns	Builder	2014	1997–2000	
Zdeno Chára	Player	2025	2006-2020	
Gerry Cheevers	Player	1985	1965–1972, 1975–1980	
Dit Clapper	Player	1947	1927–1947	
Sprague Cleghorn	Player	1958	1925–1928	
Paul Coffey	Player	2004	2000–2001	
Roy Conacher	Player	1998	1938–1942, 1945–1946	
Bun Cook	Player	1995	1936–1937	
Bill Cowley	Player	1968	1935–1947	
Cy Denneny	Player	1959	1928–1929	
Woody Dumart	Player	1992	1935–1942, 1945–1954	
Phil Esposito	Player	1984	1967–1976	
Fernie Flaman	Player	1990	1945–1952, 1954–1956	
Frank Fredrickson	Player	1958	1926–1929	
Jarome Iginla	Player	2020	2013–2014	
Busher Jackson	Player	1971	1941–1944	
Jeremy Jacobs	Builder	2017	1975–present	
Tom Johnson	Player	1970	1963–1965	
Duke Keats	Player	1958	1926–1927	
Guy Lapointe	Player	1993	1983–1984	
Brian Leetch	Player	2009	2005–2006	
Harry Lumley	Player	1980	1957–1960	
Mickey MacKay	Player	1952	1928–1930	
Sylvio Mantha	Player	1960	1936–1937	
Joe Mullen	Player	2000	1995–1996	
Cam Neely	Player	2005	1986–1996	
Willie O'Ree	Builder	2018	1958, 1960–1961	
Adam Oates	Player	2012	1992–1997	
Harry Oliver	Player	1967	1926–1934	
Bobby Orr	Player	1979	1966–1976	
Bernie Parent	Player	1984	1965–1967	
Brad Park	Player	1988	1975–1983	
Jacques Plante	Player	1978	1972–1973	
Babe Pratt	Player	1966	1946–1947	
Bill Quackenbush	Player	1976	1949–1956	
Jean Ratelle	Player	1985	1975–1981	
Mark Recchi	Player	2017	2009–2011	
Terry Sawchuk	Player	1971	1955–1957	
Milt Schmidt	Player	1961	1936–1942, 1946–1955	
Eddie Shore	Player	1947	1926–1940	
Babe Siebert	Player	1964	1933–1936	
Harry Sinden	Builder	1983	1966–1970, 1972–present	
Hooley Smith	Player	1972	1936–1937	
Allan Stanley	Player	1981	1956–1958	
Nels Stewart	Player	1962	1932–1935, 1936–1937	
Tiny Thompson	Player	1959	1928–1939	
Joe Thornton	Player	2025	1997-2005	
Rogie Vachon	Player	2016	1980–1982	
Cooney Weiland	Player	1971	1928–1939	

=== Foster Hewitt Memorial Award ===
Two members of the Boston Bruins organization have been honored with the Foster Hewitt Memorial Award. The award is presented by the Hockey Hall of Fame to members of the radio and television industry who make outstanding contributions to their profession and the game of ice hockey during their broadcasting career.

Members of the Boston Bruins honored with the Foster Hewitt Memorial Award
Individual	Year honored	Years with Bruins as broadcaster	References
Fred Cusick	1984	1952–1967, 1969–1997	
Bob Wilson	1987	1964–1969, 1971–1994	

=== Lester Patrick Trophy ===
The Lester Patrick Trophy has been presented by the National Hockey League and USA Hockey since 1966 to honor a recipient's contribution to ice hockey in the United States. This list includes all personnel who have ever been employed by the Boston Bruins in any capacity and have also received the Lester Patrick Trophy.

Members of the Boston Bruins honored with the Lester Patrick Trophy
Individual	Year honored	Years with Bruins	References
Charles Adams	1967	1924–1936	
Weston Adams	1974	1936–1969	
Walter Brown	1968	1946–1964	
Johnny Bucyk	1977	1957–1978	
Fred Cusick	1988	1952–1967, 1969–1997	
Phil Esposito	1978	1967–1975	
Jeremy Jacobs	2015	1975–present	
Cam Neely	2010	1986–1996	
Bobby Orr	1979	1966–1976	
Art Ross	1984	1924–1954	
Milt Schmidt	1996	1936–1942, 1945–1955	
Eddie Shore	1970	1926–1940	
Harry Sinden	1999	1966–1970, 1972–present	
Cooney Weiland	1972	1928–1932, 1935–1939	

=== United States Hockey Hall of Fame ===
Members of the Boston Bruins inducted into the United States Hockey Hall of Fame
Individual	Year inducted	Years with Bruins	References
Frank Brimsek	1973	1938–1949	
Walter Brown	1973	1951–1964	
Bobby Carpenter	2007	1988–1992	
Dave Christian	2001	1989–1991	
Brian Gionta	2019	2018	
Bill Guerin	2013	2000–2002	
Hago Harrington	2018	1925–1928	
Craig Janney	2016	1988–1992	
Myles Lane	1973	1928–1930, 1933–1934	
Reed Larson	1996	1985–1988	
Brian Leetch	2008	2005–2006	
Mike Milbury	2006	1975–1987	
Joe Mullen	1998	1995–1996	
George Owen	1973	1928–1933	
Gordie Roberts	1999	1992–1994	
Tim Thomas	2019	2002–2003, 2005–2012	
Cliff Thompson	1973	1941–1942, 1948–1949	
Tom Williams	1981	1961–1969	
Ken Yackel	1986	1958–1959	

=== Retired numbers ===
The Boston Bruins have retired thirteen of their jersey numbers, beginning with Lionel Hitchman's #3, the first jersey in NHL history (and the second in North American sports history) to be retired. Also out of circulation is the number 99 which was retired league-wide for Wayne Gretzky on February 6, 2000. Gretzky did not play for the Bruins during his 20-year NHL career and no Bruins player had ever worn the number 99 prior to its retirement.

Italics denote numbers that will be retired during the 2026–27 NHL season.

Boston Bruins retired numbers
Number	Player	Position	Years with Bruins as a player	Date of retirement ceremony	References
2	Eddie Shore	Defense	1926–1940	January 1, 1947	
3	Lionel Hitchman	Defense	1925–1934	February 22, 1934	
4	Bobby Orr	Defense	1966–1976	January 9, 1979	
5	Dit Clapper	Right Wing, Defense	1927–1947	February 12, 1947	
7	Phil Esposito	Center	1967–1975	December 3, 1987	
8	Cam Neely	Right Wing	1986–1996	January 12, 2004	
9	Johnny Bucyk	Left Wing	1957–1978	March 13, 1980	
15	Milt Schmidt	Center	1936–1955	March 13, 1980	
16	Rick Middleton	Right Wing	1976–1988	November 29, 2018	
22	Willie O'Ree	Left Wing	1958–1959; 1960–1961	January 18, 2022	
24	Terry O'Reilly	Right Wing	1972–1985	October 24, 2002	
33	Zdeno Chara	Defense	2006–2020	January 15, 2026	
37	Patrice Bergeron	Center	2003-2023	December 1, 2026	
77	Ray Bourque	Defense	1979–2000	October 4, 2001	

== Team awards ==
=== Eddie Shore Award ===
The Eddie Shore Award, named for Bruins great Eddie Shore, is an annual award established in 1942 given to the player "demonstrating exceptional hustle and determination" throughout the season as determined by the "Gallery Gods", an informal fan organization originally composed of season ticket holders in the old second balcony of Boston Garden

Season	Winner
2005–06	P.J. Axelsson
2006–07	Tim Thomas
2007–08	Phil Kessel
2008–09	Milan Lucic
2009–10	Mark Recchi
2010–11	Shawn Thornton
2011–12	Zdeno Chara
2012–13	Patrice Bergeron
2013–14	Brad Marchand
2014–15	Milan Lucic
2015–16	Matt Beleskey
2016–17	David Pastrnak
2017–18	Kevan Miller
2018–19	Jake DeBrusk
2019–20	Brandon Carlo
2020–21	Brad Marchand
2021–22	Charlie McAvoy
2022–23	Charlie Coyle
2023–24	Charlie Coyle
2024–25	Morgan Geekie
2025–26	Charlie McAvoy

=== Elizabeth C. Dufresne Trophy ===
The Elizabeth C. Dufresne Trophy is an annual award given to the player who is "most outstanding in home games" as voted by the Boston chapter of the Professional Hockey Writers' Association. Along with other team awards, the Dufresne Trophy is traditionally presented at the last home game of each regular season. The most frequently honored player is Ray Bourque, who won the Dufresne Trophy seven times. Brad Marchand, Phil Esposito and Bobby Orr each won it five times, while Milt Schmidt, Rick Middleton, & David Pastrňák won it four times each.

Season	Winner
1935–36	Tiny Thompson
1936–37	Tiny Thompson
1937–38	Eddie Shore
1938–39	Eddie Shore
1939–40	Dit Clapper
1940–41	Dit Clapper
1941–42	Bobby Bauer
1941–42	Woody Dumart
1941–42	Milt Schmidt
1942–43	Frank Brimsek
1943–44	Bill Cowley
1944–45	Jack Crawford
1945–46	Jack Crawford
1946–47	Milt Schmidt
1947–48	Frank Brimsek
1948–49	Pat Egan
1949–50	Milt Schmidt
1950–51	Milt Schmidt
1951–52	Jim Henry
1952–53	Fleming Mackell
1953–54	Jim Henry
1954–55	Leo Labine
1955–56	Terry Sawchuk
1956–57	Jerry Toppazzini
1957–58	Jerry Toppazzini
1958–59	Vic Stasiuk
1959–60	Bronco Horvath
1960–61	Leo Boivin
1961–62	Doug Mohns
1962–63	Johnny Bucyk
1963–64	Eddie Johnston
1964–65	Ted Green

Season	Winner
1965–66	Johnny Bucyk
1966–67	Bobby Orr
1967–68	Phil Esposito
1968–69	Phil Esposito
1969–70	Bobby Orr
1970–71	Phil Esposito
1971–72	Bobby Orr
1972–73	Phil Esposito
1973–74	Phil Esposito
1973–74	Bobby Orr
1974–75	Bobby Orr
1975–76	Gregg Sheppard
1976–77	Jean Ratelle
1977–78	Terry O'Reilly
1977–78	Brad Park
1978–79	Rick Middleton
1979–80	Ray Bourque
1980–81	Rick Middleton
1981–82	Rick Middleton
1982–83	Pete Peeters
1983–84	Rick Middleton
1984–85	Ray Bourque
1985–86	Ray Bourque
1986–87	Ray Bourque
1987–88	Cam Neely
1988–89	Randy Burridge
1989–90	Ray Bourque
1990–91	Cam Neely
1991–92	Vladimir Ruzicka
1992–93	Adam Oates
1993–94	Ray Bourque

Season	Winner
1994–95	Cam Neely
1995–96	Ray Bourque
1996–97	Jozef Stumpel
1997–98	Jason Allison
1998–99	Byron Dafoe
1999–00	Joe Thornton
2000–01	Jason Allison
2001–02	Brian Rolston
2002–03	Joe Thornton
2003–04	Andrew Raycroft
2005–06	Patrice Bergeron
2006–07	Marc Savard
2007–08	Marco Sturm
2008–09	Marc Savard
2009–10	Patrice Bergeron
2010–11	Tim Thomas
2011–12	Brad Marchand
2012–13	Patrice Bergeron
2013–14	David Krejci
2014–15	Tuukka Rask
2015–16	Loui Eriksson
2016–17	Brad Marchand
2017–18	Brad Marchand
2018–19	Brad Marchand
2019–20	David Pastrnak
2020–21	Brad Marchand
2021–22	David Pastrnak
2022–23	Linus Ullmark

Season	Winner
2023–24	David Pastrnak
2024–25	David Pastrnak
2025–26	Jeremy Swayman

=== John P. Bucyk Award ===
The John P. Bucyk Award, named for Bruins great Johnny Bucyk, is an annual award given for "Charitable and Community Endeavors."

Season	Winner
1999–00	Steve Heinze
2000–01	Don Sweeney
2001–02	Hal Gill
2002–03	Nick Boynton
2003–04	Martin Lapointe
2005–06	P. J. Axelsson
2006–07	Patrice Bergeron
2007–08	Zdeno Chara

Season	Winner
2008–09	Aaron Ward
2009–10	Shawn Thornton
2010–11	Andrew Ference
2011–12	Brad Marchand
2012–13	Gregory Campbell
2013–14	Tuukka Rask
2014–15	Dougie Hamilton
2015–16	Jimmy Hayes

Season	Winner
2016–17	David Pastrnak
2017–18	Tim Schaller
2018–19	Zdeno Chara
2019–20	Patrice Bergeron
2020–21	Charlie Coyle
2021–22	Nick Foligno
2022–23	Patrice Bergeron
2023–24	Linus Ullmark

Season	Winner
2024–25	Parker Wotherspoon
2025–26	Jordan Harris

=== Seventh Player Award ===
The Seventh Player Award is an annual award given to the player who "performed beyond expectations" as voted by Bruins fans. It was originally established by the team's television broadcasters, WSBK-TV, and awarded by them for many years.

Season	Winner
1968–69	Ed Westfall
1969–70	John McKenzie
1970–71	Fred Stanfield
1971–72	Derek Sanderson
1972–73	Dallas Smith
1973–74	Don Marcotte
1973–74	Carol Vadnais
1974–75	Terry O'Reilly
1975–76	Gregg Sheppard
1976–77	Gary Doak
1977–78	Stan Jonathan
1978–79	Rick Middleton
1979–80	Ray Bourque
1980–81	Steve Kasper
1981–82	Barry Pederson
1982–83	Pete Peeters
1983–84	Mike O'Connell
1984–85	Keith Crowder
1985–86	Randy Burridge

Season	Winner
1986–87	Cam Neely
1987–88	Glen Wesley
1988–89	Randy Burridge
1989–90	John Carter
1990–91	Ken Hodge, Jr.
1991–92	Vladimir Ruzicka
1992–93	Don Sweeney
1993–94	Cam Neely
1994–95	Blaine Lacher
1995–96	Kyle McLaren
1996–97	Ted Donato
1997–98	Jason Allison
1998–99	Byron Dafoe
1999–00	Joe Thornton
2000–01	Bill Guerin
2001–02	Bill Guerin
2002–03	Mike Knuble
2003–04	Andrew Raycroft
2005–06	Tim Thomas

Season	Winner
2006–07	Tim Thomas
2007–08	Milan Lucic
2008–09	David Krejci
2009–10	Tuukka Rask
2010–11	Brad Marchand
2011–12	Tyler Seguin
2012–13	Dougie Hamilton
2013–14	Reilly Smith
2014–15	David Pastrnak
2015–16	Brad Marchand
2016–17	David Pastrnak
2017–18	Charlie McAvoy
2018–19	Chris Wagner
2019–20	Charlie Coyle
2020–21	Nick Ritchie
2021–22	Jeremy Swayman
2022–23	Pavel Zacha
2023–24	Trent Frederic
2024–25	Morgan Geekie

Season	Winner
2025–26	Fraser Minten

=== Three Stars awards ===
The Bruins Three Stars Awards are annual awards given to the top three performers at home during the regular season.

Season	First	Second	Third
1973–74	Bobby Orr	Phil Esposito	Gilles Gilbert
1974–75	Phil Esposito	Bobby Orr	Gregg Sheppard
1975–76	Jean Ratelle	Gregg Sheppard	Johnny Bucyk
1976–77	Jean Ratelle	Brad Park	Peter McNab
1977–78	Terry O'Reilly	Peter McNab	Brad Park
1978–79	Rick Middleton	Peter McNab	Terry O'Reilly
1979–80	Rick Middleton	Terry O'Reilly	Ray Bourque
1980–81	Rick Middleton	Peter McNab	Ray Bourque
1981–82	Rick Middleton	Barry Pederson	Ray Bourque
1982–83	Rick Middleton	Pete Peeters	Ray Bourque
1983–84	Rick Middleton	Barry Pederson	Ray Bourque
1984–85	Ray Bourque	Ken Linseman	Keith Crowder
1985–86	Ray Bourque	Ken Linseman	Keith Crowder
1986–87	Ray Bourque	Bill Ranford	Steve Kasper
1987–88	Cam Neely	Steve Kasper	Ray Bourque
1988–89	Cam Neely	Ray Bourque	Randy Burridge
1989–90	Cam Neely	Ray Bourque	Andy Moog
1990–91	Cam Neely	Ray Bourque	Craig Janney
1991–92	Andy Moog	Ray Bourque	Vladimir Ruzicka
1992–93	Adam Oates	Joe Juneau	Ray Bourque
1993–94	Cam Neely	Ray Bourque	Adam Oates
1994–95	Cam Neely	Ray Bourque	Blaine Lacher
1995–96	Adam Oates	Ray Bourque	Bill Ranford
1996–97	Ray Bourque	Ted Donato	Jozef Stumpel
1997–98	Byron Dafoe	Jason Allison	Ray Bourque
1998–99	Byron Dafoe	Ray Bourque	Jason Allison
1999–00	Joe Thornton	Kyle McLaren	Sergei Samsonov
2000–01	Jason Allison	Bill Guerin	Joe Thornton
2001–02	Byron Dafoe	Brian Rolston	Joe Thornton
2002–03	Joe Thornton	Glen Murray	Mike Knuble
2003–04	Andrew Raycroft	Joe Thornton	Glen Murray
2005–06	Patrice Bergeron	Brad Boyes	Tim Thomas
2006–07	Marc Savard	Tim Thomas	Glen Murray
2007–08	Tim Thomas	Marc Savard	Marco Sturm
2008–09	Marc Savard	Zdeno Chara	Tim Thomas
2009–10	Patrice Bergeron	David Krejci	Tuukka Rask
2010–11	Tim Thomas	Patrice Bergeron	Milan Lucic
2011–12	Tim Thomas	Patrice Bergeron	Milan Lucic
2012–13	Tuukka Rask	Patrice Bergeron	Tyler Seguin
2013–14	Tuukka Rask	David Krejci	Patrice Bergeron
2014–15	Patrice Bergeron	Tuukka Rask	Brad Marchand
2015–16	Patrice Bergeron	Tuukka Rask	David Krejci
2016–17	Tuukka Rask	Patrice Bergeron	Brad Marchand
2017–18	Tuukka Rask	Brad Marchand	Patrice Bergeron
2018–19	Brad Marchand	Patrice Bergeron	David Pastrnak
2019–20	David Pastrnak	Tuukka Rask	Brad Marchand
2020–21	Brad Marchand	Patrice Bergeron	Craig Smith
2021–22	David Pastrnak	Brad Marchand	Patrice Bergeron
2022–23	David Pastrnak	Linus Ullmark	Brad Marchand
2023–24	David Pastrnak	Jeremy Swayman	Brad Marchand
2024–25	David Pastrnak	Jeremy Swayman	Morgan Geekie
2025–26	Jeremy Swayman	David Pastrnak	Morgan Geekie

=== All Centennial Team ===
The Bruins All-Centennial Team was created as a part of the Bruins centennial celebrations in 2024 as a list of "the most legendary players in franchise history", as was voted upon by an independent committee of journalists and media members, historians and members of the hockey community.

Years with team	Name	Position
1957-1978	Johnny Bucyk	Forward
2003-2023	Patrice Bergeron	Forward
1964-65, 1967-83	Wayne Cashman	Forward
1935-1947	Bill Cowley	Forward
1967-1976	Phil Esposito	Forward
2006-21, 2022-23	David Krejci	Forward
2009-2025	Brad Marchand	Forward
1978-1988	Rick Middleton	Forward
1986-1996	Cam Neely	Forward
1971-1985	Terry O’Reilly	Forward
2014-present	David Pastrnak	Forward
1936-42, 1945-55	Milt Schmidt	Forward
1979-2000	Ray Bourque	Defensemen
2006-2020	Zdeno Chara	Defensemen
1927-1947	Dit Clapper	Defensemen
1966-1976	Bobby Orr	Defensemen
1975-1983	Brad Park	Defensemen
1938-43, 1946-49	Frank Brimsek	Goaltender
1965-72, 1975-80	Gerry Cheevers	Goaltender

== Other awards ==
Boston Bruins who have received non-NHL awards
Award	Description	Winner	Season	References
Best Championship Performance ESPY Award	Best performance in a championship game, series, or tournament of the last calendar year	Tim Thomas	2011	
Best NHL Player ESPY Award	Best NHL player of the last calendar year	Tim Thomas	2011	
Charlie Conacher Humanitarian Award	For humanitarian or community service projects	Bobby Orr	1970–71	
Charlie Conacher Humanitarian Award	For humanitarian or community service projects	Johnny Bucyk	1975–76	
Charlie Conacher Humanitarian Award	For humanitarian or community service projects	Brad Park	1982–83	
Golden Hockey Stick	Best Czech ice hockey player	David Krejci	2012	
Golden Hockey Stick	Best Czech ice hockey player	David Pastrnak	2017	
Golden Hockey Stick	Best Czech ice hockey player	David Pastrnak	2018	
Golden Hockey Stick	Best Czech ice hockey player	David Pastrnak	2019	
Golden Hockey Stick	Best Czech ice hockey player	David Pastrnak	2020	
Golden Hockey Stick	Best Czech ice hockey player	David Pastrnak	2021	
Golden Hockey Stick	Best Czech ice hockey player	David Pastrnak	2023	
Golden Hockey Stick	Best Czech ice hockey player	David Pastrnak	2024	
Golden Hockey Stick	Best Czech ice hockey player	David Pastrnak	2025	
Lionel Conacher Award	Canada's male athlete of the year	Bobby Orr	1970	
Lionel Conacher Award	Canada's male athlete of the year	Phil Esposito	1972	
Lionel Conacher Award	Canada's male athlete of the year	Phil Esposito	1973	
Lou Marsh Trophy	Canada's top athlete	Bobby Orr	1970	
Lou Marsh Trophy	Canada's top athlete	Phil Esposito	1972	
Sports Illustrated Sportsperson of the Year	Given to an athlete or team whose performance that year most embodies the spirit of sportsmanship and achievement.	Bobby Orr	1970	

== See also ==
- List of National Hockey League awards
