= Steve Kasper =

Canadian ice hockey player

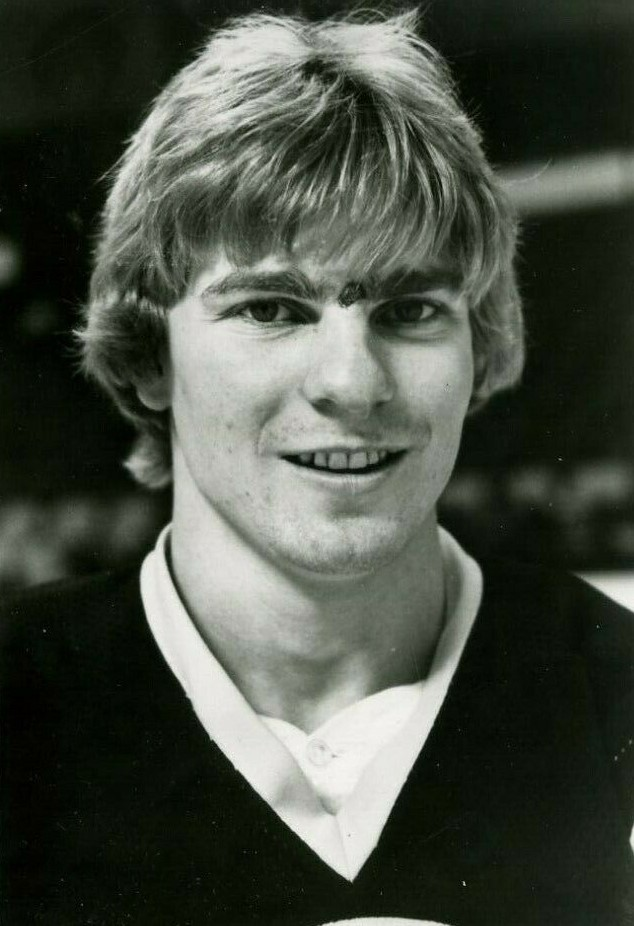
- Kasper with the Boston Bruins in 1980
- Born: September 28, 1961 (age 65) Saint-Lambert, Quebec, Canada
- Height: 5 ft 8 in (173 cm)
- Weight: 175 lb (79 kg; 12 st 7 lb)
- Position: Centre
- Shot: Left
- Played for: Boston Bruins; Los Angeles Kings; Philadelphia Flyers; Tampa Bay Lightning
- NHL draft: 81st overall, 1980; Boston Bruins
- Playing career: 1980–1993

Stephen Neil Kasper (born September 28, 1961) is a Canadian former professional ice hockey forward who played thirteen seasons in the National Hockey League (NHL) with the Boston Bruins, Los Angeles Kings, Philadelphia Flyers and Tampa Bay Lightning. Kasper won the Frank J. Selke Trophy as top defensive forward during his second season in the NHL. He moved into coaching following his playing career, serving as the Bruins' head coach during the 1995–96 and 1996–97 seasons.

He has since coached in European leagues, minor leagues and currently is the head coach of Kent Hills School.

== Playing career ==
=== Early years ===
Kasper grew up in the Montreal area in a small town called Saint-Lambert. He began playing hockey at the age of 5 in local out door rinks. He later stated "I was very fortunate we had the climate and the town had the facilities for us. Every day we weren't in school we were out skating." Growing up his favorite player was Jean Beliveau and he enjoyed watching the Montreal Canadiens.

At the age of five, Kasper began playing in the Saint-Lambert Minor Hockey Association and continued to play in the league until he was 16. He then began playing with the Verdun Éperviers and the Sorel Black Hawks in the Quebec Major Junior Hockey League. After scoring 71 points in his first year with the team in 1977–78, he followed this up with a 100+ point season with 37 goals 67 assists in the 1978–79 QMJHL season. Kasper then followed this up with a second consecutive 100-point campaign scoring 57 goals and 65 assists in the 1979–80 QMJHL season.

=== Boston Bruins (1980–1989) ===
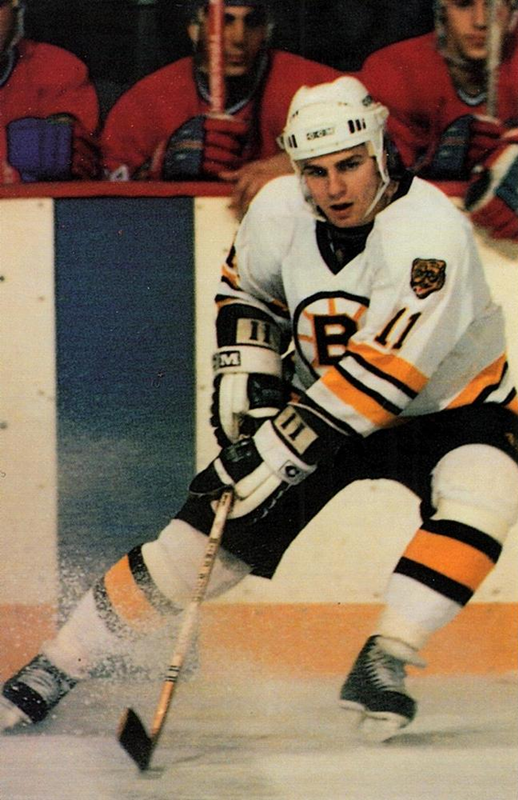
1984 postcard of Steve Kasper for Boston Bruins

Following back-to-back 100+ point seasons, Kasper was chosen as the 81st overall pick by the Boston Bruins in the 1980 NHL entry draft. Kasper never played in the minors, immediately earning a spot on the Bruins roster. During his rookie year in the 1980–81 season, Kasper appeared in 76 games and scored 21 goals with 35 assists for 57 total points. Kasper also quickly emerged as one of the league’s best checking players of his day. Despite Kasper’s physical stature not being impressive (5’8″ and 175 pounds), he was known for showing tremendous will and effort throughout his career not letting anything get in his way.

In his second season in 1981–82, Kasper continued to show off his defensive/checking abilities while also having a solid scoring touch having another 20-goal season along with 31 assists in 73 total games. For his defensive prowess, Kasper was awarded the Frank J. Selke Trophy as the league's best defensive forward, beating out Bob Gainey, who had won the trophy the previous four seasons. During the Stanley Cup playoffs, Kasper scored his first three postseason goals along with six assists, however the Bruins were eliminated by the Quebec Nordiques in the divisional round.

Kasper would miss all but 24 games of the 1982–83 season with a torn capsule in his left shoulder. The injury required arthroscopic surgery to remove torn cartilage on November 9, 1982, and then major reconstructive surgery on December 7. He returned for the Bruins playoff run, which saw him score two goals in the second round series Buffalo before playing in just two games of the third round versus the Islanders. Kasper was healthy enough to start the opening games of the 1983–84 season but became sore in November due to a separated shoulder versus Quebec that saw him miss all of December, January, and most of February when he re-aggravated it in trying to return that month to play as he played in just 27 games, contributing three goals and 11 assists.

Kasper made a full recovery and managed to stay healthy during the 1984–85 season, scoring a hat trick on November 25, 1984, vs. Montreal. Kasper would also return to form as one of the top defensive forwards and finished the with 77 total appearances scoring 16 goals and 24 assists. However, the Bruins were eliminated in the first round of the postseason. The 1985-86 seen Kasper appear in all 80 games for the only time in his career scoring 40 points once again with 17 goals and 23 assists. He and the Bruins once again faced first round elimination in the playoffs.

Kasper missed the first game of the 1986–87 season to go back to Montreal so he could be with his wife as she gave birth to their first child. From here he did not miss another game and was put on the same line as Cam Neely. The two would stay on the same line for the remainder of Kasper's tenure with Boston. In 79 total games, Kasper scored 20 goals and collected 30 assists, but once again he and the Bruins were beaten in the first round. The following year in the 1987–88 season, Kasper would have his best statistical season with 70 points in 76 games (26 goals and 44 assists). He would recorded a four-point game (with two goals and assists each) in a Bruins 8-3 victory over Calgary on November 17, 1987. During the playoffs, he would contribute 13 points on 7 goals and 6 assists in 23 games as the Bruins reached the Stanley Cup Final, where they were defeated by the Edmonton Oilers, 4–0 with one tie. He finished the season runner up to Guy Carbonneau for the Selke Trophy.

During his time with the Bruins, Kasper’s job was to shadow Wayne Gretzky when the team played Edmonton due to his defensive excellence. During these matchups, he would gain notoriety for being one of the few players that could effectively shut Gretzky down with his shadowing strategy.

=== Los Angeles Kings (1989–1991) ===
After playing more than half of the 1988–89 season with the Bruins, Kasper was traded to the Los Angeles Kings for Bobby Carpenter. During this tenure he would enjoy some success with the Kings, playing with Wayne Gretzky and Bernie Nicholls. That year, Kasper appeared in 78 total games finishing with 19 goals and 31 assists. Kasper scored six points in eleven postseason games as the Kings were eliminated in the divisional round.

The 1989–90 season saw Kasper make appear in 77 games, netting 17 goals and 28 assists as he and the Kings were once again beaten in the second round. Kasper missed part of the following season with a ruptured sinus cavity and a fractured eye socket, which he suffered during a January 2, 1991, game vs. the New York Rangers. He would go on to finish the year with 9 goals and 19 assists in 67 games played. During the postseason, he scored 10 points in 10 games as the Kings were eliminated by Edmonton in the divisional round.

=== Later career with Philadelphia and Tampa Bay (1991–1993) ===
Prior to the 1991–92 season, Kasper along with Steve Duchesne, were dealt to the Philadelphia Flyers. Kasper only appeared in 16 games for the Flyers that year after tearing his ACL in his right knee during a game vs Edmonton on November 14, 1991. Kasper made a full recovery the following year and played 21 games for the Flyers before being traded to the Tampa Bay Lightning. He then missed part of the season with a bruised shoulder, which he suffered during Tampa Bay's January 30, 1993 game vs. Minnesota. Kasper then retired at the end of the year due to chronic concussions and other injuries. He finished his thirteen-year NHL career with 177 goals and 291 assists for 468 total points.

== Coaching career ==
Kasper returned to Boston as an assistant coach to Brian Sutter. On July 22, 1994, he was named the inaugural head coach of the Providence Bruins of the American Hockey League. He led the Bruins to a 39-30-11 record during the regular season that saw them lose in the second round of the AHL playoffs. Kasper then again returned to Boston in the 1995–96 season to replace Sutter as head coach. He led the Bruins to a 91-point season, but the team was beaten in the first round by the Florida Panthers. The following year, the Bruins would only win 26 games, missing the playoffs for the first time in 28 years. Kasper was subsequently fired and replaced by Pat Burns.

On May 3, 2007, Kasper became the new head coach of the Yarmouth Mariners of the Maritime Junior A Hockey League (CJAHL). The team had finished last place the year before he took the position but Kasper's first season saw them go to a first-place finish in the regular season with a 42-12-4 record, winning the Eastlink division Championship and then winning the 2008 Kent Cup championship title vs Woodstock Slammers in six games.

Kasper was then hired as director of pro scouting for the Toronto Maple Leafs in 2013. He held the position for two years before being fired on April 12, 2015, the day after the team's last game of the season.

After this, Kasper would go to China, serving as the head coach of the Chinas U18 team in 2017 and coaching them to a 2-2-0 record. He would then move into an assistant position at Kunlun Red Star from 2018 to 2020. He completed the 2017-18 season as an assistant coach responsible for the forward group and penalty killing units. Upon completion of the KHL season, he was hired as the head coach of the Kunlun Red Star MHL team (Juniors) before being asked to return to the KHL in an assistant role to focus on defense and penalty killing.

Kasper would serve as the head coach of DVTK Jegesmedvék for the 2023–24 season. In 2024, Kasper took over as the head coach of HC Presov in Slovakia. Under Kasper’s guidance the team greatly improved and went 27-4 leading them to a first-place finish in the regular season. But just before the start of the playoffs, Kasper stepped down as coach to go back to Canada to deal with a serious family issue. The team won the league championship and got promoted to Slovak Extraliga.

In September 2025, Kasper was named head coach of the Kent Hills School (located in Kents Hill, Maine) girls’ Varsity Prep Ice Hockey team. With his family living in Andover, Massachusetts, Kasper was tapped to serve as the Kents Hill community's inaugural "Coach-in-Residence", which aimed to bring talent to the state that saw him live on campus to work with athletes and offer youth clinics during the season.

== Awards and achievements ==
- Seventh Player Award in 1981
- Frank J. Selke Trophy winner in 1982.
- Bruins 3 Stars award in 1987 and 1988
- Defensive player Award In 1990 and 1991
- Saint-Lambert Sports Hall of Fame inductee
- Named One of the Top 100 Best Bruins Players of all Time.

As a coach

- Kent Cup 2008
- Eastlink division Championship 2008
- Slovenská hokejová liga regular season champion 2025

== Personal life ==
Kasper is married and has two sons, named Jordan and Michael. Kasper, who enjoyed his time with the Bruins, still resides in Massachusetts in the town of Andover.

Kasper started his own company in 1998 called Kasper Sports Management International. He would serve as a sports agent from 1998 to 2009, and one of his clients was Chris Bourque, the son of his former teammate Ray Bourque. Kasper has also stated Bourque is one of his close friends.

== Career statistics ==
			Regular season					Playoffs
Season	Team	League	GP	G	A	Pts	PIM	GP	G	A	Pts	PIM
1977–78	Verdun Éperviers	QMJHL	63	26	45	71	16	4	2	4	6	0
1978–79	Verdun Éperviers	QMJHL	67	37	67	104	53	11	7	6	13	22
1979–80	Verdun/Sorel Éperviers	QMJHL	70	57	65	122	117	—	—	—	—	—
1980–81	Sorel Éperviers	QMJHL	2	5	2	7	0	—	—	—	—	—
1980–81	Boston Bruins	NHL	76	21	35	56	94	3	0	1	1	0
1981–82	Boston Bruins	NHL	73	20	31	51	72	11	3	6	9	22
1982–83	Boston Bruins	NHL	24	2	6	8	24	12	2	1	3	10
1983–84	Boston Bruins	NHL	27	3	11	14	19	3	0	0	0	7
1984–85	Boston Bruins	NHL	77	16	24	40	33	5	1	0	1	9
1985–86	Boston Bruins	NHL	80	17	23	40	73	3	1	0	1	4
1986–87	Boston Bruins	NHL	79	20	30	50	51	3	0	2	2	0
1987–88	Boston Bruins	NHL	76	26	44	70	35	23	7	6	13	10
1988–89	Boston Bruins	NHL	49	10	16	26	49	—	—	—	—	—
1988–89	Los Angeles Kings	NHL	29	9	15	24	14	11	1	5	6	10
1989–90	Los Angeles Kings	NHL	77	17	28	45	27	10	1	1	2	2
1990–91	Los Angeles Kings	NHL	67	9	19	28	33	10	4	6	10	8
1991–92	Philadelphia Flyers	NHL	16	3	2	5	10	—	—	—	—	—
1992–93	Philadelphia Flyers	NHL	21	1	3	4	2	—	—	—	—	—
1992–93	Tampa Bay Lightning	NHL	47	3	4	7	18	—	—	—	—	—
NHL totals			821	177	291	468	554	94	20	28	48	82

== Coaching record ==
Team	Year	Regular season						Postseason
Team	Year	G	W	L	T	Pts	Finish	Result
BOS	1995–96	82	40	31	11	91	2nd in Northeast	Lost in First Round
BOS	1996–97	82	26	47	9	61	6th in Northeast	Missed Playoffs
Total		164	66	78	20			

Preceded by Bob Gainey	Winner of the Frank J. Selke Trophy; 1982	Succeeded by Bobby Clarke
Preceded by Mike O'Connell	Head Coach of the Providence Bruins; 1994–95	Succeeded by Bob Francis
Preceded by Brian Sutter	Head coach of the Boston Bruins; 1995–97	Succeeded by Pat Burns
