= Mark Paré =

- Born: July 26, 1957 (age 69) Windsor, Ontario, Canada
- Position: Linesman
- Playing career: 1979–2010

Mark Paré (born July 26, 1957) is a Canadian retired National Hockey League linesman who wore uniform number 79.

== Early life ==
Paré was born in Windsor, Ontario, and raised in LaSalle. He began officiating minor and junior league hockey in the mid-1970s.

== Career ==
Paré's first NHL game was on October 1, 1979, a matchup between the Washington Capitals and the Buffalo Sabres. Paré officiated in 2,169 games in his NHL career. He wore number 79 when the nameplates were changed back to numbers in 1994. He also officiated in 30 playoffs games and two NHL All-Star games (1992 Philadelphia and 2002 Los Angeles). His officiating also brought him overseas to Austria, Helsinki, and Stockholm.

He retired from the NHL after the April 11, 2010, game between the Detroit Red Wings versus the Chicago Blackhawks.
