= Ken Hodge =

English-Canadian ice hockey player (b. 1944)

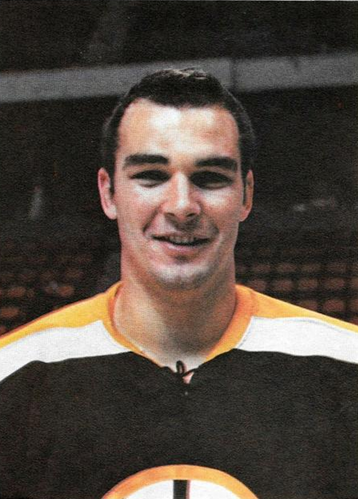
- Hodge with the Boston Bruins in 1970
- Born: 25 June 1944 (age 81) Birmingham, England
- Height: 6 ft 2 in (188 cm)
- Weight: 214 lb (97 kg; 15 st 4 lb)
- Position: Right wing
- Shot: Right
- Played for: Chicago Black Hawks; Boston Bruins; New York Rangers
- Playing career: 1964–1980

Kenneth Raymond Hodge, Sr. (born 25 June 1944) is a Canadian former hockey player who played in the National Hockey League (NHL) for the Chicago Black Hawks, Boston Bruins and New York Rangers. He was born in Birmingham, England, but grew up in Toronto, Ontario.

== Playing career ==
One of the few British-born players in NHL history, Ken Hodge was signed by the Black Hawks as a teenager, and had a stellar junior league career with the St. Catharines Black Hawks of the Ontario Hockey Association (OHA), leading the league in goals and points with 123 in 65 games during the 1965 season before being called up for good to Chicago the next year.

Hodge was one of the first British born players to make significant impact in the NHL.

Hodge played his first season in the NHL during the 1965-66 season scoring his 1st NHL goal vs the New York Rangers at 11:43 of 3rd period on 29 December 1965 in a 3-0 Chicago win. Later that same season Hodge scored his 1st NHL hat-trick vs the Montreal Canadiens on 15 January, in a 6-4 Canadiens win.

Stereotyped as a grinding policeman — at 6'2", 215 lbs, Hodge was one of the larger forwards of his era — the rangy right wing played two mediocre seasons with the Black Hawks before being sent to Boston in a blockbuster deal with teammates Phil Esposito and Fred Stanfield. From here Hodge went on to become a corner stone of the 1970s Bruins teams. With the trade making the Bruins into a powerhouse, as Esposito centred Hodge and left wing Ron Murphy in the 1968–69 season to break the NHL record for points in a season by a forward line, and Hodge scored an impressive 45 goals and 45 assists to complement Esposito's record season of 126 points. His production fell off significantly the next season (although Boston won the Stanley Cup bolstered by Hodge's skilled play), but the 1970–71 season saw the Bruins launch the greatest offensive juggernaut the league had ever seen, breaking dozens of offensive records. In that flurry, on one of the most feared forward lines of the era (with linemates Esposito and Wayne Cashman), Hodge would break the league record for points in a season by a right winger with 105, and finish fourth in NHL scoring. Phil Esposito (with 152 points), Bobby Orr (with 139), Johnny Bucyk (116) and Hodge finished 1–2–3–4 in league scoring, the first time in NHL history the season's top four scorers all played for one team. This would lead to Hodge being named a First Team All-Star as-well as being invited to the 1971 NHL all star game. Throughout Hodge’s time with the Bruins he was also known for being highly productive during the playoffs.

The 1971–72 season saw Hodge slowed down by injuries, although he recovered again in the playoffs with 17 points in 15 games helping the Bruins to their second Stanley Cup in three years during the 1971–72 season. The following year in 1972-73 Hodge would have a 81 point season leading to him playing in the NHL all star game for the second time in his career. Following this up In 1973–74, he scored 50 goals and 105 points to place third in league scoring, and with Esposito (145), Orr (122) and Cashman (89) likewise finished 1–2–3–4 in league scoring for the only other time in NHL history the season's top four scorers all played for one team. This would once again lead to Hodge being honored as a First Team All-Star and would play in his 3rd All star game. Hodge would also become the first person born outside of Canada to score 50 goals in a season and was the only one to do so until Finnish born Jari Kurri did so in 1984. He continued to be a consistent scorer his next two seasons with the bruins. Having a 66 point season in during the 1974-75 season and a 61 point season in 1975-76.

His offensive production negatively impacted by Esposito's trade to the New York Rangers in early-November 1975, Hodge's remaining time with the Bruins was spent in head coach Don Cherry's doghouse. Hodge was reunited with Esposito on 26 May 1976, when he was dealt to the Rangers who were hoping for a replication of their successes with the Bruins. The transaction cost the team Rick Middleton who was ten years younger and a swifter skater than Hodge.

Hodge had modest success in New York in the 1976–77 season, and then tailed off the following year before being sent down to the New Haven Nighthawks of the American Hockey League (AHL). Hodge retired thereafter, but came out of retirement in 1979–80 to play for the Binghamton Dusters of the AHL, in his final professional season.

In 2023 Hodge would be Named One of the Top 100 Best Bruins Players of all Time.

== Retirement ==
Hodge finished his NHL career with 881 games, 328 goals, 472 assists and 800 points. He remained in the Boston area, and is still active with the Bruins' alumni team and in alumni affairs.

After retirement Hodge spent time working as a broadcaster in Boston. He served as the radio colour commentator for the Boston College men's hockey team throughout their 2007–08 NCAA Championship season, working alongside play-by-play man Jon Rish on flagship station WTTT (1150AM).

Hodge also served as a state director of the Massachusetts Special Olympics.

In 2009 Hodge was honored by the Sports Museum at there annual Tradition event, being given the hockey legacy award.

In 2010 Hodge played in the Boston Bruins legends classic game at Fenway park.

== Personal life ==
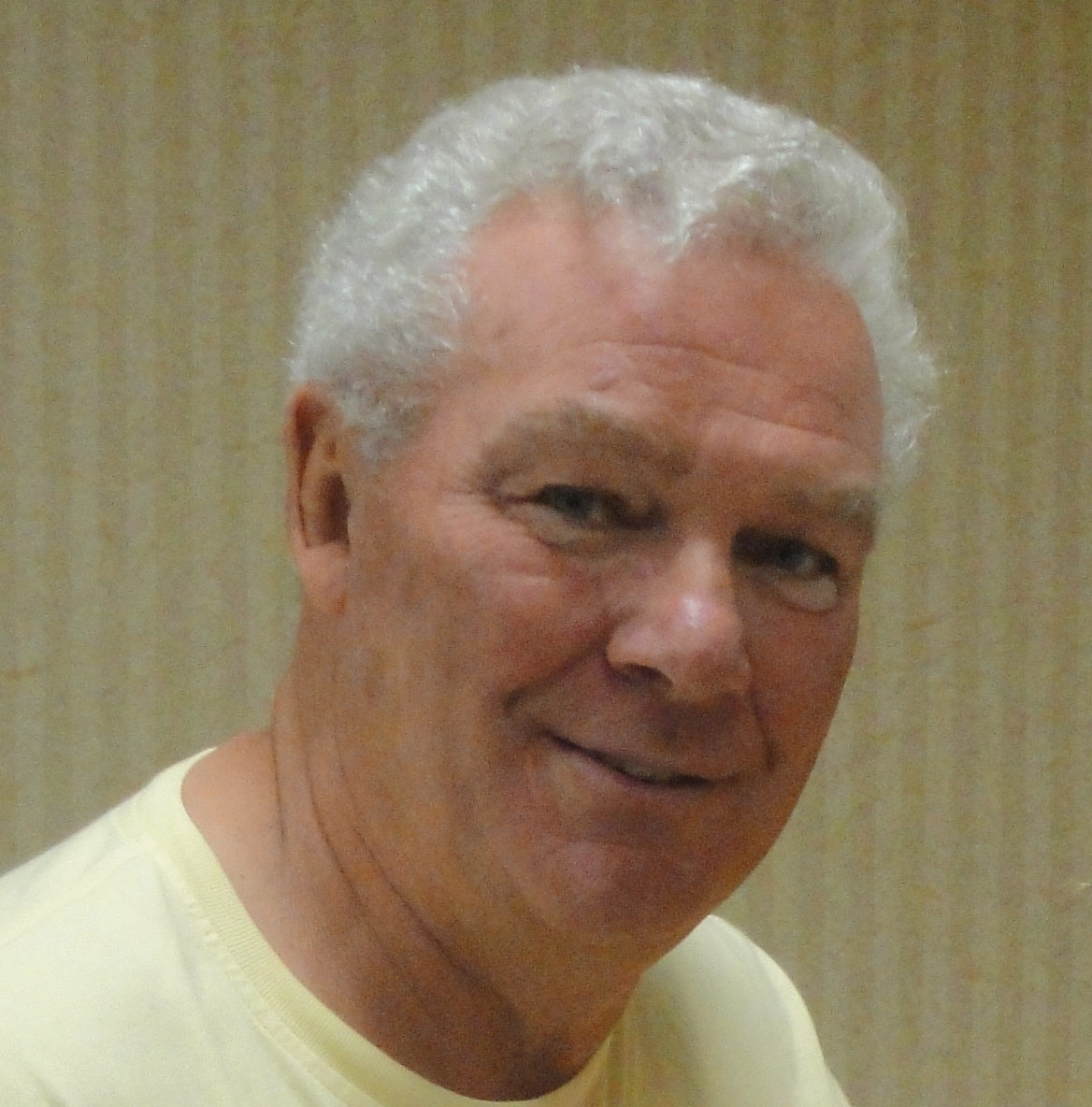
Hodge in 2011

Hodge is married to his wife Mary, they lived in Lynnfield, Massachusetts during his career with the Bruins raising 5 kids; his home was instantly recognizable and well known to local residents by its large swimming pool in the back yard in the shape of his Bruins' uniform number, 8. After spending 50 years in Lynnfield Hodge has now moved down to Florida where he spends time with old teammates Wayne Cashman and Phil Esposito.

Hodge's son, Ken Hodge, Jr., was also a professional hockey player from 1987 to 1998. Hodge Jr. went on to coach the Tulsa Oilers, whose roster included his younger brother Brendon, who wore their father's number 8. Brendon Hodge is now the assistant coach of the Rapid City Rushmore Thunder varsity hockey team, who won the 2014 state championship. Another son, Dan Hodge, was drafted by the Boston Bruins in the ninth round (194th overall) in the 1991 NHL entry draft, and played in the American Hockey League and International Hockey League, and won the 2000 Kelly Cup championship in the East Coast Hockey League with the Peoria Rivermen.

== Achievements ==
- 1964–65 Eddie Powers Memorial Trophy winner
- Named a First Team All-Star in 1971 and 1974.
- Played in the All-Star Game in 1971, 1973 and 1974.
- Two time Stanley Cup champion (1970 and 1972)
- Most assists in one NHL game by a Bruin player (6; tied with Bobby Orr and David Pastrňák).
- Named One of the Top 100 Best Bruins Players of all Time.

== Career statistics ==
			Regular season					Playoffs
Season	Team	League	GP	G	A	Pts	PIM	GP	G	A	Pts	PIM
1961–62	St. Catharines Teepees	OHA-Jr.	31	4	3	7	6	6	1	0	1	6
1962–63	St. Catharines Black Hawks	OHA-Jr.	50	23	23	46	97	—	—	—	—	—
1963–64	St. Catharines Black Hawks	OHA-Jr.	56	37	51	88	110	13	6	19	25	28
1964–65	St. Catharines Black Hawks	OHA-Jr.	55	63	60	123	107	5	3	7	10	8
1964–65	Chicago Black Hawks	NHL	1	0	0	0	2	—	—	—	—	—
1964–65	Buffalo Bisons	AHL	2	0	2	2	0	4	0	0	0	4
1965–66	Chicago Black Hawks	NHL	63	6	17	23	47	5	0	0	0	8
1966–67	Chicago Black Hawks	NHL	69	10	25	35	59	6	0	0	0	4
1967–68	Boston Bruins	NHL	74	25	31	56	31	4	3	0	3	2
1968–69	Boston Bruins	NHL	75	45	45	90	75	10	5	7	12	4
1969–70	Boston Bruins	NHL	72	25	29	54	87	14	3	10	13	7
1970–71	Boston Bruins	NHL	78	43	62	105	113	7	2	5	7	6
1971–72	Boston Bruins	NHL	60	16	40	56	81	15	9	8	17	62
1972–73	Boston Bruins	NHL	73	37	44	81	58	5	1	0	1	7
1973–74	Boston Bruins	NHL	76	50	55	105	43	16	6	10	16	16
1974–75	Boston Bruins	NHL	72	23	43	66	90	3	1	1	2	0
1975–76	Boston Bruins	NHL	72	25	36	61	42	12	4	6	10	4
1976–77	New York Rangers	NHL	78	21	41	62	43	—	—	—	—	—
1977–78	New York Rangers	NHL	18	2	4	6	8	—	—	—	—	—
1977–78	New Haven Nighthawks	AHL	52	17	29	46	13	15	3	4	7	20
1979–80	Binghamton Dusters	AHL	37	10	20	30	24	—	—	—	—	—
NHL totals			881	328	472	800	779	97	34	47	81	120

== See also ==
- List of National Hockey League players from the United Kingdom
- List of NHL players with 100-point seasons
