= Wayne Cashman =

Canadian ice hockey player, coach (born 1945)

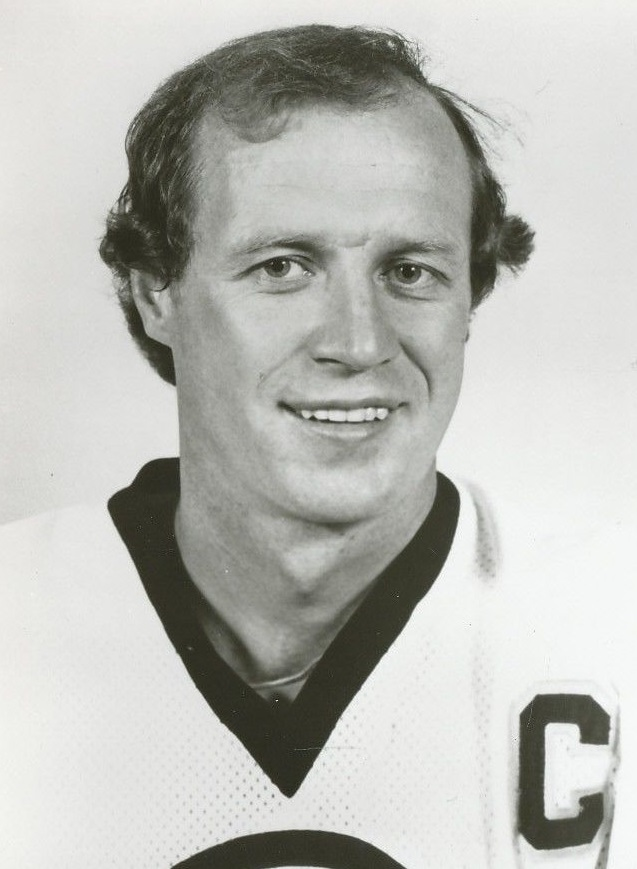
- Cashman with the Boston Bruins in 1981
- Born: June 24, 1945 (age 81) Kingston, Ontario, Canada
- Height: 6 ft 1 in (185 cm)
- Weight: 180 lb (82 kg; 12 st 12 lb)
- Position: Left wing
- Shot: Right
- Played for: Boston Bruins
- Coached for: Philadelphia Flyers
- National team: Canada
- Playing career: 1965–1983
- Coaching career: 1987–2006

Wayne Cashman (born June 24, 1945) is a Canadian former professional ice hockey player and coach. He played 17 seasons for the Boston Bruins of the National Hockey League (NHL) and helped them win the Stanley Cup twice. He was the last active player who started his NHL career in the Original Six era.

== Early life ==
Cashman was born in Kingston Ontario Canada on June 24th 1945. His family owned a farm just outside Kingston where he spent his childhood. Cashman began playing hockey at an early age and would listen to hockey on the radio every night. He played for the Kingston peewee team that won an Ontario championship and later played Junior B hockey for the Frontenacs.

== Playing career ==
=== Early career (1962-68) ===
Cashman played junior hockey in the OHA with the Oshawa Generals; one of his teammates was Bobby Orr. He made his debut for the team appearing in a singular game during the 1962–63 season. He then made 27 appearances for the Generals the following year scoring 9 goals and 12 assists for 21 points. That same year during the 1964-65 season Cashman at the age of 19 who was an un drafted free agent made his first appearance for the Boston Bruins appearing in one game.

Cashman then returned to Oshawa for his final year with the club during the 1965–66 season, and scored 35 point season in 17 games. He had an even better postseason, having 37 points in 14 games as his side was a finalist in the Memorial Cup. Cashman then joined the Boston Bruins farm club the Oklahoma City Blazers for the 1966–67 season. In 70 appearances Cashman scored 20 goals and 36 assists as the Blazers finished first in the regular season. During the postseason Cashman appeared in all 11 games contributing 3 goals and 4 assists as he and the Blazers defeated the Omaha Knights to win the Adams Cup. The following year in 1967–68 Cashman appeared in 42 games with the Blazers being a point per game player scoring 21 goals and 30 assists. This productivity led to him being called up to the Bruins to finish out the year playing in 12 games he recorded his first NHL points with 4 assists.

=== Boston Bruins career (1968-1983) ===
For the start of the 1968-69 season, Cashman played 21 games for the Bruins' AHL affiliate the Hershey Bears. Following his brief stint with the Bears he was then called up to the Bruins where he would score his first NHL goal on November 6, 1968, in Boston's 7-1 home victory over the Philadelphia Flyers. He would finish out the rest of the season with the Bruins playing 51 games, scoring 8 goals and 23 assists. From here, Cashman would play his entire NHL career with the Boston Bruins (1964–65, 1967–83). His jersey number was 12.

He was a hard-grinding left winger on the era's most formidable forward line with centre Phil Esposito and right wing Ken Hodge. His role was to get into the corners and battle for loose pucks, and feed them to Esposito or Hodge. He was also a tenacious forechecker and served as an enforcer to protect Esposito and Orr. Esposito has regarded Cashman as underrated and not receiving sufficient credit, saying, "Wayne was the digger. He was the heart and soul of our line. Without a doubt." This has led to him being described as the perfect teammate being and one of the best cornermen in the history of the NHL. Bobby Orr later stated "If you needed him to do something for your team, he could play anywhere you wanted."

Throughout his career, Cashman embodied the Bruins style of grit and determination. Not being afraid to get into the dirty areas and dig hard along the boards. This led to him becoming a favorite among Bruins fans as he developed the nickname 'Cash', from his fellow teammates and Bruins fans alike. He also developed a reputation to as a clutch player for the team during the postseason, and becoming an established leader for the team as his career went on.

Cashman's first full season with the Bruins came during the 1969-70 season, in which he would appear in 70 games, tallying 9 goals and 26 assists. During The Bruins made the postseason that and Cashman was a key player in their postseason. Appearing in 14 games, Cashman scored both his first playoff goal and assists finishing with 9 points as the Bruins defeated both New York and Chicago to reach the 1970 Stanley Cup finals where they defeated the St Louis Blues 4-0.

During his career Cashman would get into many scraps on the ice, being known as one of the best fighters of his era throwing his signature uppercut. Along with being a playmaker Cashman also served as the Bruins' policeman. In the age of "Big Bad Bruins," he was one of the biggest. If the opposition started to get confrontational with Esposito or Orr, Cashman would be the first to intervene.

In just his second year during the 1970-71 season Cashman's scoring doubled as he averaged a point per game in 77 appearances scoring 21 goals and 58 assists for 79 points, finishing as one of leads top scorers. This started a streak of him scoring 20+ goals in four straight seasons from 1971-1974 when he also incurred 100 or more penalty minutes. In total he scored at least 20 goals 8 times throughout his career. He also compiled his first 4 point game on December 19, 1970, vs St Louis. That year he and the Bruins finished with the leagues best record but were upset by the Montreal Canadiens in the first round. Cashman's scoring declined the following year in 1971-72 but was still and effective contributor scoring 23 goals and 29 assists in 74 games. He scored 2 goals and 2 assists in a Bruins 5-4 Victory over Detroit on March 4, 1972. The Bruins once again finished with the leagues best record, and during the postseason Cashman's scored 4 goals and 7 assists as the Bruins defeated both Toronto and St Louis to reach the 1972 Stanley Cup finals. Cashman scored twice in the deciding game of the latter finals against the New York Rangers, won by Boston, 3-0, as he and the Bruins won their second Stanley Cup in 3 years.

In 1972, he played for Team Canada in the first four games of the Summit Series. Before the final four games, at an exhibition game in Sweden, Ulf Sterner's stick got lodged in Cashman's mouth, cutting his tongue open. The injury required 50 stitches and kept him out of the rest of the Summit Series.

The 1972-73 season saw Cashman score his first career hat trick on January 21, 1973, with all 3 goals coming in the second period of a 8-2 victory over the California Golden Seals. Just 7 days later on January 28, Cashman scored another hat trick along with an assist in a Bruins 6-5 victory over Los Angeles. He finished the year with 29 goals and 39 assists in 76 games as he and the Bruins lost in the first round of the playoffs. The following year, 1973-74, saw Cashman's best statistical season, when he finished fourth in the league in points with 89 (30 goals 59 assists) played in the All-Star Game, and was named to the NHL Second All-Star team. That year he joined his teammates Esposito (145), Orr (122) and Hodge (105) where they finished 1–2–3–4 in league scoring this was the second and last time in NHL history the season's top four scorers all played for one team. Cashman also had two 5 point games on the year the first coming on March 6, 1974, vs. St Louis where he scored 3 goals and 2 assists. His second came also exactly a month later on April 7 vs. Toronto where he also scored 3 goals and 2 assists. During the postseason, Cashman scored 14 points in 16 games as the Bruins reached the 1974 Stanley Cup finals where they were defeated by Philadelphia 4-2.

During the 1974-75 season Cashman only appeared in 42 games scoring 11 goals and 22 assists. This was due to a ruptured disc in his back which ended up requiring surgery. Cashman suffered from back pain throughout most of his career which started after he had crashed into a goal post during the 1972-73 season developing back pain. This led to Cashman being known for his physical and mental toughness throughout his career, as he never let his back injury slow him down. Bruins GM Harry Sinden later stated, "I can't believe there's ever been a player who had a higher pain tolerance than him. I've seen him lying on the training room floor 20 minutes before a game for his back. He was constantly in pain and, if we had a game, he was still going out to play. Not in all my years, have I ever seen a player who could tolerate pain like him."

Cashman made a full comeback the following year in 1975-76 playing in all 80 games for the first and only time of his career scoring 28 goals and 43 assists for 71 points. He and the Bruins advanced to the semifinals where they were defeated by Philadelphia 4-1. Cashman missed 15 games during the 1976-77 season due to his back issues he still scored 15 goals and 37 assists during the regular season. However by the postseason Cashman had made full recovery appearing in all 14 games scoring 9 points as the Bruins reached the 1977 Stanley Cup finals, however they were swept by Montreal 4-0.

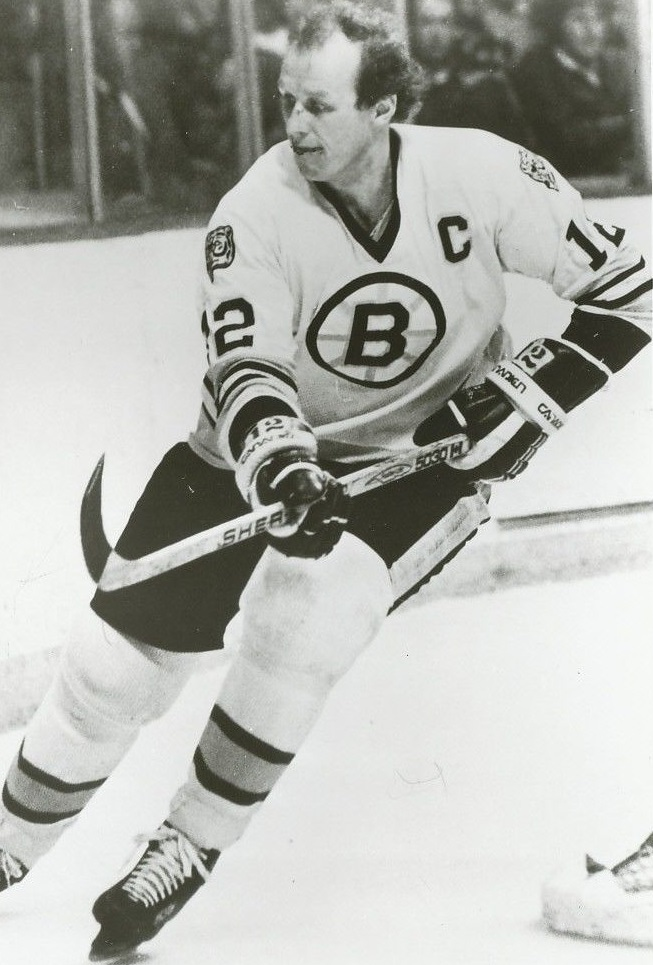
Cashman with the Boston Bruins in 1981

At the start of the 1977-78 season Cashman was named captain of the Bruins, a position he held until his retirement in 1983. Even in his later years, Cashman still served as a consistent point scorer. During his first year as captain, he was part of a historic 11 Bruins players that year who scored 20+ goals that season. 4 of these goals came during a Bruins 8-3 win over the Rangers on April 2, 1978. Cashman and the Bruins once again made it all the way to the Stanley Cup finals but were once again defeated by Montreal 4-2. The following year in 1978-79 Cashman scored 27 goals and 67 points in 75 games. However, the Bruins once again lost to Montreal in the semifinals.

Cashman only appeared in 44 games during the 1979-80 season after suffering both back and knee problems. He scored 11 goals and 21 assists. He made a full return for the postseason, however the Bruins were defeated in the second round. Cashman played 77 games during the 190-81 season and had his list 20+ goal season with 25 goals and 35 assists. The Bruins were then eliminated in the first round of the postseason. Cashman still had a productive season the following year in 1981-82 but scoring 12 goals and 31 assists, but only appeared in 64 games. The Bruins reached the divisional round of the playoffs but were defeated by Quebec. Cashman's last season came the following year during the 1982-83 season, where he appeared in 65 games, scoring 4 goals and 11 assists, retiring after the Bruins were eliminated from the playoffs in 1983.

He was the last active player from the NHL's Original Six era, just beating out Serge Savard, whose team was eliminated in an earlier playoff round. He finished his career with 1,027 games played 277 goals and 516 assists being a reliable player for the team his entire career. He was the second player in Bruins history to play his 1000th career game and the first to play all 1000 solely in Bruins uniform. He still remains a legendary figure in the city of Boston.

In late 2024, there was a push among Bruins fans and former players to have Cashman's number 12 retired. His former teammate Phil Esposito stated "Personally, I think number 12 should be up there for Wayne Cashman, who played for 18 years for that team, was captain for four years, coached the team, and gave his life's blood to the Bruins. He should be up there." The Bruins alumni organization would discuss the topic with team president Cam Neely however as of 2025 there has been no official decision.

== Coaching career ==
After his retirement as a player, Cashman went into business for himself. However when his old teammate Phil Esposito became general manager of the New York Rangers he hired Cashman as a scout. Then when the Rangers fired their head coach Esposito had Cashman help coach the team, and subsequently when they hired their new head coach Tom Webster he asked Cashman to stay on as an assistant, which he did for five seasons. He then served four years as an assistant for the Tampa Bay Lightning from 1992-93 till 1995-96. Esposito described Cashman as coach stating "He's a special guy because he can handle any kind of situation with a player, whether that player likes him or not." Following this he served as an assistant coach for the San Jose Sharks for one season in 1996-97.

He was then appointed head coach of the Philadelphia Flyers for the 1997-98 season and held that post for 61 games coaching the team to a 32-20-9 record, until he was replaced by Roger Neilson; he served thereafter as the team's assistant coach till the 1999-2000 season. He also on the coaching staff of Team Canada in the 1998 Olympics in Nagano, Japan, as an assistant to Marc Crawford. Cashman then spent the 2000-01 season as head coach of the Pensacola Ice Pilots of the ECHL. He coached the team to a 27-40 record missing the postseason. He then returned to Boston as an assistant coach with the Bruins from 2001 until 2006.

== Awards and honors ==
- J. Ross Robertson Cup champion 1966
- Adams Cup champion 1967
- Stanley Cup champion 1970 and 1972
- NHL second All-Star team 1974
- Played in the 1974 NHL All-Star game
- Inducted into the Kingston & District Sports Hall of Fame 2000
- Inducted into the Canada's Sports Hall of Fame in 2005
- In 2012 Cashman’s named was inshrined on the Canada walk of fame as a member of the 1972 Summit series team
- In 2016 Cashman was honored by the Sports Museum Tradition event in the TD Garden, being given the hockey legacy award.
- Named one of the top 100 best Bruins players of all time
- Named to the Boston Bruins all centennial team

== Personal life ==
Cashman is married to his wife Lynn and now resides in Florida he has two children, a son, Scott, and a daughter, Becky. He also serves as a Grandfather to his four granddaughters.

In a somewhat notorious moment, after the Boston Bruins won the 1970 Stanley Cup, Cashman got drunk, and with heavy traffic at a busy intersection, Cashman got out of the back seat of the car he and his teammates had been in and stepped out into an intersection, and started to direct traffic. This resulted in him getting arrested, and using his one phone call to order Chinese food.

== Career statistics ==
=== Regular season and playoffs ===
			Regular season					Playoffs
Season	Team	League	GP	G	A	Pts	PIM	GP	G	A	Pts	PIM
1962–63	Kingston Frontenacs	EOJHL	—	—	—	—	—	—	—	—	—	—
1962–63	Oshawa Generals	MJrL	1	0	1	1	0	—	—	—	—	—
1963–64	Oshawa Generals	OHA-Jr.	27	9	12	21	37	6	2	2	4	15
1964–65	Oshawa Generals	OHA-Jr.	55	27	46	73	104	6	3	2	5	11
1964–65	Boston Bruins	NHL	1	0	0	0	0	—	—	—	—	—
1965–66	Oshawa Generals	OHA-Jr.	48	26	44	70	98	17	15	20	35	21
1965–66	Oshawa Generals	MC	—	—	—	—	—	14	10	27	37	51
1966–67	Oklahoma City Blazers	CHL	70	20	36	56	98	11	3	4	7	4
1967–68	Boston Bruins	NHL	12	0	4	4	2	1	0	0	0	0
1967–68	Oklahoma City Blazers	CHL	42	21	30	51	66	—	—	—	—	—
1968–69	Boston Bruins	NHL	51	8	23	31	49	6	0	1	1	0
1968–69	Hershey Bears	AHL	21	6	9	15	30	—	—	—	—	—
1969–70	Boston Bruins	NHL	70	9	26	35	79	14	5	4	9	50
1970–71	Boston Bruins	NHL	77	21	58	79	100	7	3	2	5	15
1971–72	Boston Bruins	NHL	74	23	29	52	103	15	4	7	11	42
1972–73	Boston Bruins	NHL	76	29	39	68	100	5	1	1	2	4
1973–74	Boston Bruins	NHL	78	30	59	89	111	16	5	9	14	46
1974–75	Boston Bruins	NHL	42	11	22	33	24	1	0	2	2	0
1975–76	Boston Bruins	NHL	80	28	43	71	87	11	1	5	6	16
1976–77	Boston Bruins	NHL	65	15	37	52	76	14	1	8	9	18
1977–78	Boston Bruins	NHL	76	24	38	62	69	15	4	6	10	13
1978–79	Boston Bruins	NHL	75	27	40	67	63	10	4	5	9	8
1979–80	Boston Bruins	NHL	44	11	21	32	19	10	3	3	6	32
1980–81	Boston Bruins	NHL	77	25	35	60	80	3	0	1	1	0
1981–82	Boston Bruins	NHL	64	12	31	43	59	9	0	2	2	6
1982–83	Boston Bruins	NHL	65	4	11	15	20	8	0	1	1	0
NHL totals			1,027	277	516	793	1,041	145	31	57	88	250

=== International ===
Year	Team	Event	GP	G	A	Pts	PIM
1972	Canada	SS	2	0	2	2	14

== NHL coaching statistics ==
Team	Year	Regular season						Postseason
Team	Year	G	W	L	T	Pts	Finish	Result
PHI	1997–98	61	32	20	9	(95)	2nd in Atlantic	(fired; demoted to assistant)

== See also ==
- List of NHL players with 1,000 games played
- List of NHL players who spent their entire career with one franchise

Preceded by John Bucyk	Boston Bruins captain 1977–83	Succeeded by Terry O'Reilly
Preceded by Terry Murray	Head coach of the Philadelphia Flyers; 1997–98	Succeeded by Roger Neilson
