= Randy Burridge =

Canadian ice hockey player (born 1966)

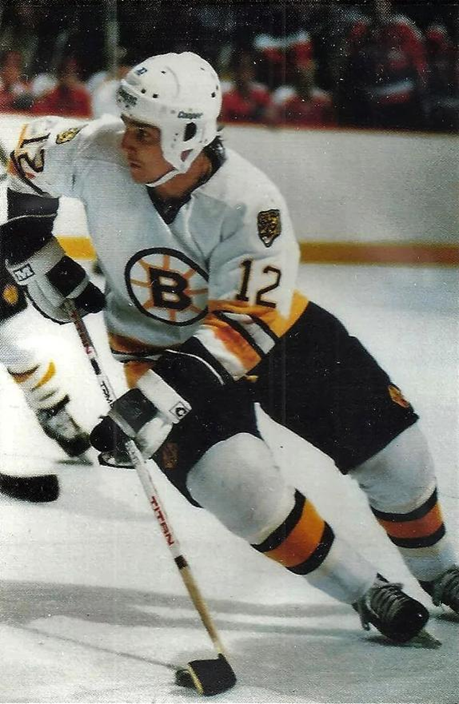
- Burridge in 1987 postcard
- Born: January 7, 1966 (age 60) Fort Erie, Ontario, Canada
- Height: 5 ft 9 in (175 cm)
- Weight: 180 lb (82 kg; 12 st 12 lb)
- Position: Left wing
- Shot: Left
- Played for: Boston Bruins; Washington Capitals; Los Angeles Kings; Buffalo Sabres
- NHL draft: 157th overall, 1985; Boston Bruins
- Playing career: 1985–1999

Randall H. Burridge (born January 7, 1966) is a Canadian former professional ice hockey player.

He played in 706 games in the National Hockey League, scoring 199 goals along with 251 assists for a total of 450 points, while accumulating 458 penalty minutes.

== Career ==
Burridge was selected by the Boston Bruins in round 8, #157 overall in the 1985 NHL entry draft. He started his career with the Bruins in 1985. His various nicknames included "Garbage", for all the garbage goals he collected, "Stump", for his short, stocky build, and "Stump Pump", for the fist pump he performed after scoring a goal.

== Accomplishments ==
- With the Bruins, he was a two-time winner of the Seventh Player Award (performing above and beyond expectations)
- Won the Elizabeth C. Dufresne Trophy in 1989 as the Bruins' home MVP.
- Played in the 1992 NHL All-Star Game
- Tim Horton Memorial Award (Unsung Hero) as well as the Punch Imlach Memorial Award (Dedication and Leadership) in 1995–96.

== Career statistics ==
			Regular season					Playoffs
Season	Team	League	GP	G	A	Pts	PIM	GP	G	A	Pts	PIM
1981–82	Fort Erie Meteors	GHL	35	12	24	36	4	—	—	—	—	—
1982–83	Fort Erie Meteors	GHL	42	32	56	88	32	—	—	—	—	—
1983–84	Peterborough Petes	OHL	55	6	7	13	44	8	3	2	5	7
1984–85	Peterborough Petes	OHL	66	49	57	106	88	17	9	16	25	18
1985–86	Peterborough Petes	OHL	17	15	11	26	23	3	1	3	4	2
1985–86	Boston Bruins	NHL	52	17	25	42	28	3	0	4	4	12
1985–86	Moncton Golden Flames	AHL	—	—	—	—	—	3	0	2	2	2
1986–87	Boston Bruins	NHL	23	1	4	5	16	2	1	0	1	2
1986–87	Moncton Golden Flames	AHL	47	26	41	67	139	3	1	2	3	30
1987–88	Boston Bruins	NHL	79	27	28	55	105	23	2	10	12	16
1988–89	Boston Bruins	NHL	80	31	30	61	39	10	5	2	7	8
1989–90	Boston Bruins	NHL	63	17	15	32	47	21	4	11	15	14
1990–91	Boston Bruins	NHL	62	15	13	28	40	19	0	3	3	39
1991–92	Washington Capitals	NHL	66	23	44	67	50	2	0	1	1	0
1992–93	Washington Capitals	NHL	4	0	0	0	0	4	1	0	1	0
1992–93	Baltimore Skipjacks	AHL	2	0	1	1	2	—	—	—	—	—
1993–94	Washington Capitals	NHL	78	25	17	42	73	11	0	2	2	12
1994–95	Washington Capitals	NHL	2	0	0	0	2	—	—	—	—	—
1994–95	Los Angeles Kings	NHL	38	4	15	19	8	—	—	—	—	—
1995–96	Buffalo Sabres	NHL	74	25	33	58	30	—	—	—	—	—
1996–97	Buffalo Sabres	NHL	55	10	21	31	20	12	5	1	6	2
1997–98	Buffalo Sabres	NHL	30	4	6	10	0	—	—	—	—	—
1997–98	Rochester Americans	AHL	6	0	1	1	19	1	0	1	1	0
1998–99	Las Vegas Thunder	IHL	25	7	12	19	8	—	—	—	—	—
1998–99	Hannover Scorpions	DEL	14	7	6	13	35	—	—	—	—	—
NHL totals			706	199	251	450	458	107	18	34	52	105
