= 43rd National Hockey League All-Star Game =

Professional ice hockey exhibition game

43rd NHL All-Star Game
	1	2	3	Total
Campbell	2	6	2	10
Wales	1	2	3	6
- Date: January 18, 1992
- Arena: Spectrum
- City: Philadelphia
- MVP: Brett Hull (St. Louis)
- Attendance: 17,380

The 43rd National Hockey League All-Star Game was contested at The Spectrum in Philadelphia on 18 January 1992. It featured 16 goals as the Campbell Conference defeated the Wales Conference, 10–6. Brett Hull was named as the All-Star M.V.P. by recording two goals and one assist, while playing on a line with Los Angeles Kings' Wayne Gretzky and Luc Robitaille. This was also the first All-Star Game in which the San Jose Sharks sent a representative.

== A weekend of "firsts" ==
For the first time, the responsibility to choose the non-starting members of the teams was transferred to a committee of general managers. The breadth of NHL talent available was highlighted as 13 players made their All-Star debut. Seven of those players would also score their first-ever All-Star goals that included first-timers Owen Nolan, Alexander Mogilny, Gary Roberts and Randy Burridge.

Also for the first time, not a single penalty was called and three goaltenders were employed for each team, with each goalie playing one period. Previously, two goaltenders had shared duties, switching halfway through the second period.

Lastly, the Fastest Skater event was introduced in the Super Skills Competition.

== Uniforms ==
As part of the NHL's 75th anniversary celebrations, the league used modernized versions of the All-Star uniforms worn between 1947 and 1959. As the home team, the Wales Conference wore white uniforms with a red and blue sleeve stripe pattern, and blue trim, while the Campbell conference wore red uniforms with blue and white sleeve stripes and white trim. The NHL 75th anniversary patch was worn on the upper left chest. No additional shoulder patches were worn, making this the first All-Star event since before Rendez-Vous '87 not to feature the logo for the game itself.

== Super Skills Competition ==
The Super Skills Competition required five tie-breaking penalty shots, until Mario Lemieux scored to claim the victory for the Wales Conference. In addition, Ray Bourque set a record by hitting four targets on four shots in the Accuracy Shooting event and in the inaugural Fastest Skater event finals, Sergei Fedorov defeated his former Soviet linemate Alexander Mogilny in a photo finish.

=== Individual event winners ===
- Fastest Skater - Sergei Fedorov (Detroit Red Wings) - 14.363 seconds
- Accuracy Shooting - Ray Bourque (Boston Bruins) - 4 hits, 4 shots
- Hardest Shot - Al MacInnis (Calgary Flames) - 93.0 mph
- Goaltenders Competition - Mike Richter (New York Rangers) - 2 GA, 25 shots

== The game ==
=== Summary ===
	Wales Conference	Campbell Conference
Final score	6	10
Scoring summary	K. Stevens (Jagr, Lemieux) 11:20 1st; S. Stevens (Mogilny, Messier) 5:37 2nd; Nolan (Sakic, Bourque) 19:29 2nd; Trottier (Hatcher) 4:03 3rd; Mogilny (Desjardins) 5:28 3rd; Burridge (Sakic, Nolan) 19:12 3rd	Linden (Roenick, Tinordi) 7:53 1st; Gretzky (Hull, Robitaille) 14:56 1st; Hull (Gretzky, Robitaille) 0:42 2nd; Bellows (Fedorov, MacInnis) 7:40 2nd; Roenick (Ellett) 8:13 2nd; Fleury (Robinson) 11:06 2nd; Hull (Gretzky, Robitaille) 11:59 2nd (GWG); Fleury (Damphousse, Oates) 17:33 2nd; Bellows (Fedorov) 4:50 3rd; Roberts (Linden) 18:42 3rd
Penalties	none	none
Shots on goal	14–9–18–41	15–12–15–42
Win/loss	L - Don Beaupre	W - Tim Cheveldae

- Referee: Don Koharski
- Linesmen: Mark Pare, Mark Vines
- TV: NBC, TSN, SRC

== Rosters ==
	Wales Conference	Campbell Conference
Head coach	(Canada) Scotty Bowman (Pittsburgh Penguins)	(Canada) Bob Gainey (Minnesota North Stars)
Honorary captain	(Canada) Bobby Clarke	(Canada) Lanny McDonald
Lineup	Starting lineup: (Canada) 7 - D Paul Coffey (Pittsburgh Penguins); (United States) 25 - LW Kevin Stevens (Pittsburgh Penguins); (Canada) 33 - G Patrick Roy (Montreal Canadiens); (Canada) 66 - C Mario Lemieux (Pittsburgh Penguins), Captain; (Czechoslovakia) 68 - RW Jaromir Jagr (Pittsburgh Penguins); (Canada) 77 - D Ray Bourque (Boston Bruins), Alternate; Commissioner's selection: (United States) (Canada) 19 - C Bryan Trottier (Pittsburgh Penguins); Reserves: (Canada) 1 - G Don Beaupre (Washington Capitals); (United States) 2 - D Brian Leetch (New York Rangers); (Canada) 4 - D Scott Stevens (New Jersey Devils); (United States) 5 - D Kevin Hatcher (Washington Capitals); (Canada) 9 - LW Kirk Muller (Montreal Canadiens); (Canada) 11 - C Mark Messier (New York Rangers), Alternate; (Canada) 12 - RW Owen Nolan (Quebec Nordiques); (Canada) 15 - C John Cullen (Hartford Whalers); (Canada) 16 - C Joe Sakic (Quebec Nordiques); (Canada) 17 - RW Rod Brind'Amour (Philadelphia Flyers); (Canada) 18 - LW Randy Burridge (Washington Capitals); (Canada) 20 - LW Ray Ferraro (New York Islanders); (Canada) 28 - D Eric Desjardins (Montreal Canadiens); (United States) 35 - G Mike Richter (New York Rangers); (Russia) 89 - RW Alexander Mogilny (Buffalo Sabres)	Starting lineup: (Canada) 2 - D Al MacInnis (Calgary Flames); (United States) 7 - D Chris Chelios (Chicago Blackhawks); (Canada) 30 - G Ed Belfour (Chicago Blackhawks); (United States) 16 - RW Brett Hull (St. Louis Blues), Alternate; (Canada) 20 - LW Luc Robitaille (Los Angeles Kings); (Canada) 99 - C Wayne Gretzky (Los Angeles Kings), Captain; Commissioner's selection: (Canada) 19 - D Larry Robinson (Los Angeles Kings); Reserves: (Canada) 1 - G Kirk McLean (Vancouver Canucks); (Canada) 4 - D Dave Ellett (Toronto Maple Leafs); (United States) 6 - D Phil Housley (Winnipeg Jets); (Canada) 10 - LW Gary Roberts (Calgary Flames); (Canada) 12 - C Adam Oates (St. Louis Blues); (Canada) 14 - RW Theoren Fleury (Calgary Flames); (Canada) 17 - RW Trevor Linden (Vancouver Canucks); (Canada) 18 - C Steve Yzerman (Detroit Red Wings); (Canada) 21 - LW Vincent Damphousse (Edmonton Oilers); (Canada) 23 - LW Brian Bellows (Minnesota North Stars); (Canada) 24 - D Doug Wilson (San Jose Sharks), Alternate; (Canada) 25 - D Mark Tinordi (Minnesota North Stars); (United States) 27 - C Jeremy Roenick (Chicago Blackhawks); (Canada) 32 - G Tim Cheveldae (Detroit Red Wings); (Russia) 91 - C Sergei Fedorov (Detroit Red Wings)

== See also ==
- 1991–92 NHL season

== Notes ==
- ^1 Bob "The Badger" Johnson was the head coach of the Pittsburgh Penguins when they won the Stanley Cup in the 1990–91 season. Shortly after winning the Cup, Johnson was diagnosed with brain cancer and turned his coaching duties over to Scotty Bowman. Johnson died of brain cancer in Colorado Springs, Colorado, on November 26, 1991.
