= Mikko Eloranta =

Finnish ice hockey player

- Born: 24 August 1972 (age 54) Aura, FIN
- Height: 6 ft 0 in (183 cm)
- Weight: 190 lb (86 kg; 13 st 8 lb)
- Position: Left wing
- Shot: Left
- Played for: TPS; Ilves; Boston Bruins; Los Angeles Kings; SC Rapperswil-Jona
- National team: Finland
- NHL draft: 247th overall, 1999; Boston Bruins
- Playing career: 1995–2009

Mikko Henrikki Eloranta (born 24 August 1972) is a Finnish former ice hockey player who played with TPS Turku of the SM-Liiga. He represented Finland in both the Olympic Winter Games and the World Cup of Hockey.

== Playing career ==
Eloranta was drafted 247th overall by the Boston Bruins in the 1999 NHL entry draft. He played for Boston for two seasons before he was traded by the Bruins, along with Jason Allison, to the Los Angeles Kings for Jozef Stumpel and Glen Murray on 24 October 2001.

He played for the Kings another two seasons. He then returned to Finland, playing for TPS in the Finnish National League.

In 2004, Eloranta played in Switzerland for the Rapperswil-Jona Lakers. Eloranta suffered a major injury in August 2005 during an exhibition game, breaking a bone in his leg, and was not a member of the silver medal-winning Finnish Hockey Team at the 2006 Winter Olympics in Turin, Italy.

After three seasons with the Kings, Eloranta signed with the Malmö Redhawks of the Swedish 1st division for the 2007–08 season. Eloranta then returned to his native Finland, linking up with old club TPS for the 2008–09 season.

== Career statistics ==
=== Regular season and playoffs ===
			Regular season					Playoffs
Season	Team	League	GP	G	A	Pts	PIM	GP	G	A	Pts	PIM
1989–90	TPS	FIN U20	2	0	0	0	0	—	—	—	—	—
1990–91	TPS	FIN U20	35	8	8	16	18	—	—	—	—	—
1991–92	TPS	FIN U20	19	3	1	4	8	—	—	—	—	—
1992–93	TPS	FIN U20	31	11	6	17	20	6	0	4	4	6
1993–94	Kiekko–67	FIN.2	45	3	4	7	24	—	—	—	—	—
1994–95	Kiekko–67	FIN.2	40	14	13	27	32	3	3	0	3	4
1995–96	Ilves	SM-l	43	18	15	33	86	3	0	2	2	2
1995–96	Kiekko–67	FIN.2	8	6	7	13	2	—	—	—	—	—
1996–97	TPS	SM-l	31	6	15	21	52	10	5	2	7	6
1997–98	TPS	SM-l	46	23	14	37	82	2	0	0	0	8
1998–99	TPS	SM-l	52	19	21	40	103	10	1	6	7	26
1999–2000	Boston Bruins	NHL	50	6	12	18	36	—	—	—	—	—
2000–01	Boston Bruins	NHL	62	12	11	23	38	—	—	—	—	—
2001–02	Boston Bruins	NHL	6	0	0	0	2	—	—	—	—	—
2001–02	Los Angeles Kings	NHL	71	9	9	18	54	7	1	1	2	2
2002–03	Los Angeles Kings	NHL	75	5	12	17	56	—	—	—	—	—
2003–04	TPS	SM-l	54	23	19	42	87	6	0	1	1	39
2004–05	SC Rapperswil–Jona	NLA	44	19	28	47	88	4	1	1	2	12
2005–06	SC Rapperswil–Jona	NLA	1	0	0	0	2	7	1	1	2	8
2006–07	SC Rapperswil–Jona	NLA	33	11	14	25	60	5	3	0	3	8
2007–08	Malmö Redhawks	SWE.2	36	10	14	24	74	10	4	2	6	14
2008–09	TPS	SM-l	48	9	11	20	122	8	2	2	4	6
2010–11	PaKa	FIN.4	1	1	2	3	0	—	—	—	—	—
2011–12	PaKa	FIN.4	1	1	0	1	0	—	—	—	—	—
2012–13	TarU	FIN.5	1	0	2	2	2	—	—	—	—	—
SM-l totals			274	98	95	193	532	39	8	13	21	87
NHL totals			264	32	44	76	186	7	1	1	2	2

=== International ===
Mikko Eloranta
Medal record

Representing Finland

World Championships
Silver medal – second place	1998 Zurich	Ice hockey
Silver medal – second place	1999 Oslo	Ice hockey

World Cup
Silver medal – second place	2004 Toronto	

Year	Team	Event	GP	G	A	Pts	PIM
1998	Finland	WC	10	1	1	2	12
1999	Finland	WC	12	1	2	3	6
2002	Finland	OG	4	2	0	2	2
2003	Finland	WC	7	1	1	2	16
2004	Finland	WCH	6	2	0	2	2
2005	Finland	WC	7	0	0	0	0
Senior totals			46	7	4	11	38
