= Glen Murray (ice hockey) =

Canadian ice hockey player (born 1972)

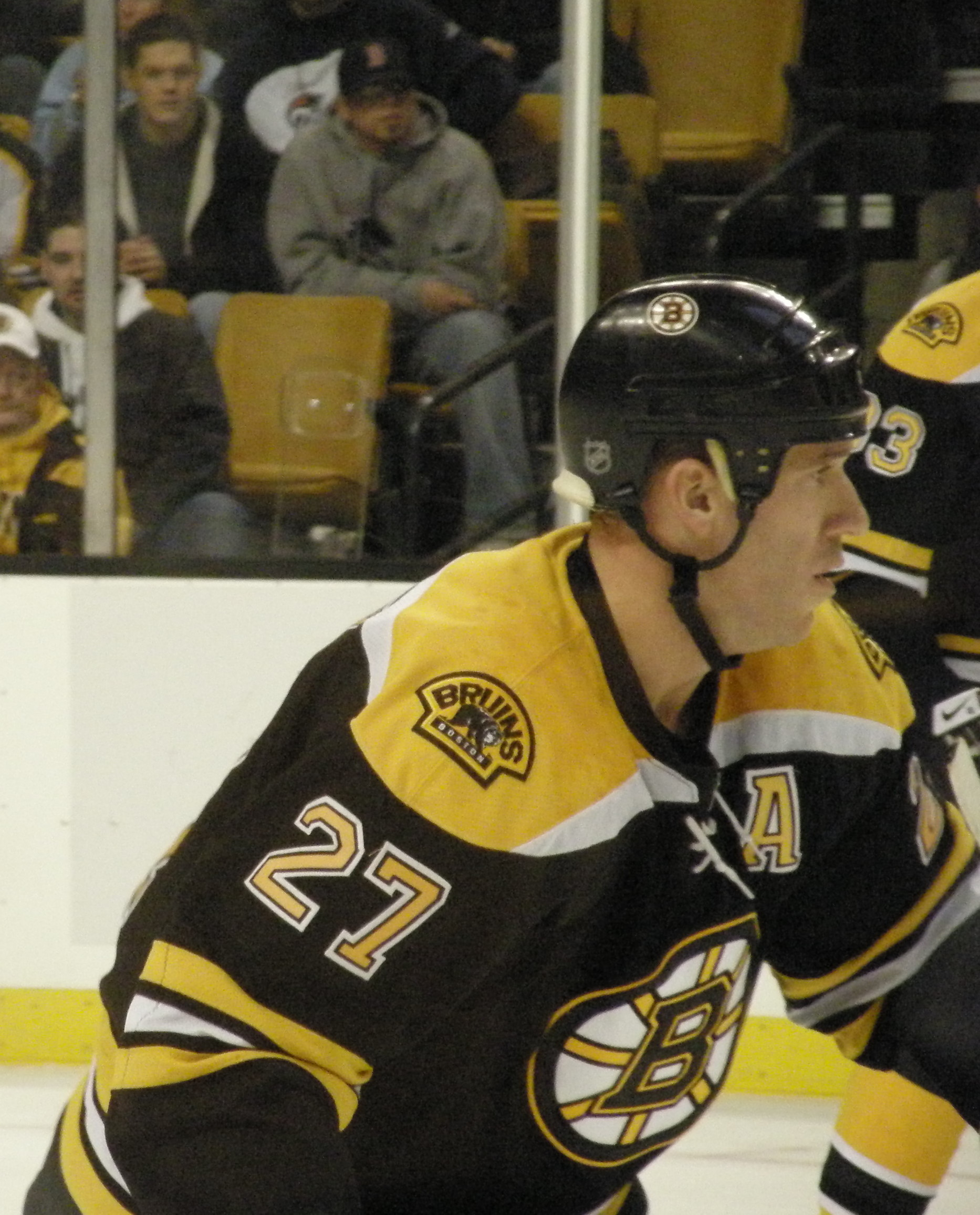
- Murray with the Boston Bruins in 2007
- Born: November 1, 1972 (age 54) Halifax, Nova Scotia, Canada
- Height: 6 ft 3 in (191 cm)
- Weight: 218 lb (99 kg; 15 st 8 lb)
- Position: Right wing
- Shot: Right
- Played for: Boston Bruins; Pittsburgh Penguins; Los Angeles Kings
- National team: Canada
- NHL draft: 18th overall, 1991; Boston Bruins
- Playing career: 1992–2008

Glen John "Muzz" Murray (born November 1, 1972) is a Canadian former professional ice hockey right winger who played 16 seasons in the National Hockey League (NHL) with the Boston Bruins, Pittsburgh Penguins and Los Angeles Kings. He is currently the Director of Player Development for the Kings.

== Playing career ==
Born in Halifax, Nova Scotia, Murray was raised in the Bridgewater area and played junior hockey for the Sudbury Wolves of the Ontario Hockey League (OHL). Murray spent three seasons with the Wolves, putting up 84 points in his final year.

Murray was a first-round draft pick, 18th overall by the Bruins in the 1991 NHL entry draft. He spent four seasons with the Bruins before being traded to the Pittsburgh Penguins with Bryan Smolinski for Kevin Stevens and Shawn McEachern. Murray's stay with the Penguins only lasted a little over a year and he was eventually on the move again; this time he was traded to Los Angeles Kings for Ed Olczyk. Murray enjoyed moderate success with the Kings, picking up some good numbers during his five-year stay, but on October 24, 2001, Murray was traded back to the Boston Bruins with Jozef Stümpel for Jason Allison and Mikko Eloranta.

In July 2002, Murray signed a two-year contract with the Bruins.

Murray enjoyed his greatest offensive season in 2002–03, scoring 92 points (44 goals and 48 assists) for the Bruins and earning a spot in the 2003 NHL All-Star Game.

In August 2005, Murray signed a four-year, $16.6 million contract extension with the Bruins.

On July 23, 2008, Murray was placed on waivers by the Boston Bruins. Three days later, on July 26, the Bruins announced the buyout of the final year of his contract to free up salary cap room. In November 2008, Murray underwent ankle surgery, claiming it was a result of an injury he sustained during the 2007–08 NHL season. His agent subsequently filed a grievance against the Bruins, arguing that the buyout was improper because Murray had been medically unfit to play due to a hockey-related injury. Under NHL rules, teams were prohibited from buying out injured players. In June 2009, an arbitrator ruled in favor of the Bruins, rejecting Murray's grievance and allowing the original buyout to stand.

== International play ==
Murray was selected to play for Team Canada at the 1998 World Championships held in Zürich and Basel in Switzerland. He played in 5 games and scored 1 goal and 2 assists as Canada finished in 6th place. He was then called up to the roster again in 2004 and scored 2 goals and 2 assists as he helped Canada capture the gold medal.

== Awards ==
- Selected to two NHL All-Star games: 2003, 2004.
- Bruins Three Stars Awards: 2003, 2004, 2007.
- Won a gold medal at the 2004 World Championships with Team Canada.
- Named One of the Top 100 Best Bruins Players of all Time.

== Career statistics ==
=== Regular season and playoffs ===
			Regular season					Playoffs
Season	Team	League	GP	G	A	Pts	PIM	GP	G	A	Pts	PIM
1988–89	Bridgewater Mustangs AAA	NSMHL	28	40	31	71	—	—	—	—	—	—
1989–90	Sudbury Wolves	OHL	62	8	28	36	17	7	0	0	0	4
1990–91	Sudbury Wolves	OHL	66	27	38	65	82	5	8	4	12	10
1991–92	Sudbury Wolves	OHL	54	37	47	84	93	11	7	4	11	18
1991–92	Boston Bruins	NHL	5	3	1	4	0	15	4	2	6	10
1992–93	Providence Bruins	AHL	48	30	26	56	42	6	1	4	5	4
1992–93	Boston Bruins	NHL	27	3	4	7	8	—	—	—	—	—
1993–94	Boston Bruins	NHL	81	18	13	31	48	13	4	5	9	14
1994–95	Boston Bruins	NHL	35	5	2	7	46	2	0	0	0	2
1995–96	Pittsburgh Penguins	NHL	69	14	15	29	57	18	2	6	8	10
1996–97	Pittsburgh Penguins	NHL	66	11	11	22	24	—	—	—	—	—
1996–97	Los Angeles Kings	NHL	11	5	3	8	8	—	—	—	—	—
1997–98	Los Angeles Kings	NHL	81	29	31	60	54	4	2	0	2	6
1998–99	Los Angeles Kings	NHL	61	16	15	31	36	—	—	—	—	—
1999–00	Los Angeles Kings	NHL	78	29	33	62	60	4	0	0	0	2
2000–01	Los Angeles Kings	NHL	64	18	21	39	32	13	4	3	7	4
2001–02	Los Angeles Kings	NHL	9	6	5	11	0	—	—	—	—	—
2001–02	Boston Bruins	NHL	73	35	25	60	40	6	1	4	5	4
2002–03	Boston Bruins	NHL	82	44	48	92	64	5	1	1	2	4
2003–04	Boston Bruins	NHL	81	32	28	60	56	7	2	1	3	8
2005–06	Boston Bruins	NHL	64	24	29	53	52	—	—	—	—	—
2006–07	Boston Bruins	NHL	59	28	17	45	44	—	—	—	—	—
2007–08	Boston Bruins	NHL	63	17	13	30	50	7	0	0	0	2
NHL totals			1,009	337	314	651	679	94	20	22	42	66

=== International ===
Year	Team	Event	GP	G	A	Pts	PIM
1998	Canada	WC	5	1	2	3	4
2004	Canada	WC	9	2	2	4	4
Senior totals			14	3	4	7	8

== See also ==
- List of NHL players with 1,000 games played

Preceded by Bryan Smolinski	Boston Bruins first-round draft pick 1991	Succeeded by Dmitri Kvartalnov
