= Jason Allison =

Canadian ice hockey player (born 1975)

- Born: May 29, 1975 (age 51) North York, Ontario, Canada
- Height: 6 ft 3 in (191 cm)
- Weight: 215 lb (98 kg; 15 st 5 lb)
- Position: Centre
- Shot: Right
- Played for: Washington Capitals; Boston Bruins; Los Angeles Kings; Toronto Maple Leafs
- NHL draft: 17th overall, 1993; Washington Capitals
- Playing career: 1993–2006
Medal record
Representing Canada
Ice hockey
World Junior Championships
| Gold medal – first place | 1994 Ostrava |
| Gold medal – first place | 1995 Alberta |

Jason Paul Allison (born May 29, 1975) is a Canadian former professional ice hockey centre who played 552 games in the National Hockey League (NHL). Allison was born in North York, Ontario, but grew up in Toronto, Ontario. His most productive seasons were with the Boston Bruins, where he briefly served as team captain. He also played for the Washington Capitals, Los Angeles Kings and Toronto Maple Leafs. A very successful junior hockey player with the London Knights, he won two gold medals as part of the men's junior national team in 1994 and 1995 and was the Ontario Hockey League's 1994 winner of the Red Tilson Trophy as the league's most outstanding player. In the NHL, he was top ten in points twice and played in the All-Star Game once. His career was derailed by injuries and a labour dispute. Allison's final game was played against the Montreal Canadiens in March 2006 which he was injured. He attempted a comeback in 2009, but ultimately failed.

== Junior hockey ==
Allison attended Daystrom Elementary Public School, Humber Summit Middle School and Emery Collegiate Secondary School in the Weston Road and Finch Avenue area of Toronto and Westview Centennial Secondary School in Toronto, Ontario. As a youth, he played in the 1989 Quebec International Pee-Wee Hockey Tournament with the Toronto Red Wings minor ice hockey team.

From 1991 to 1994, Allison played with the London Knights of the Ontario Hockey League (OHL), with his best year coming in 1993–94 when he scored 142 points in 56 games and won the Eddie Power Trophy as the league's leading scorer, the OHL's Most Gentlemanly Player and the Red Tilson Trophy as the league's most outstanding player. Allison was drafted 17th overall in the 1993 NHL entry draft by the Washington Capitals as a result. He played for the men's junior national team in both the 1994 and 1995 championships winning gold medals both times.

== NHL career ==
In 1994, Allison signed a four-year entry-level contract with the Capitals with an additional option year. He struggled to break into the Capitals lineup and was demoted to team's American Hockey League affiliate, the Portland Pirates. In 1996, the Capitals sent him on a course to improve his skating. He never met the Capitals' expectations and on March 1, 1997, was part of a major trade with the Boston Bruins. Allison, Anson Carter, Jim Carey, a 1997 third-round draft choice and a conditional 1998 second-round draft choice were traded to the Bruins for Adam Oates, Rick Tocchet and Bill Ranford. Oates, one of the NHL's superstars, had requested a trade if the Bruins did not commit to getting more talent. Allison saw a resurgence with the Bruins, putting up a then career-high 83 points in the 1997–98 season, the ninth highest total in the league. Allison led the Bruins in points three times (1997–98, 1998–99 and 2000–01). In the 2000–01 season, Allison was named captain of the team, the first since the departure of Ray Bourque. His 2000–01 season was his best when he had a career-high 95 points, good for fifth in the league. He also played in the 2001 All-Star Game. However, Allison's time with the Bruins came to an abrupt end when contract negotiations following the 2001 year reached an impasse. The Bruins traded Allison, now a fan favourite in Boston, to the Los Angeles Kings with Mikko Eloranta for Jozef Stumpel and Glen Murray on October 25, 2001. Upon his arrival in Los Angeles, Allison signed a three-year $20-million contract.

Allison joined the Kings, filling the need for a number one center who could play with Žigmund Pálffy. However, Allison suffered a stream of injuries, including major ones to the knee and neck and one of many Kings players that suffered a concussion. He missed most of the 2002–03 season and all of the following season. The 2004–05 season was cancelled by a labour dispute and Allison did not receive a qualifying offer from the Kings in 2004 allowing him to become an unrestricted free agent. Prior to the 2005–06 season, Allison signed a one-year contract with the Toronto Maple Leafs worth $1.5 million, with bonus incentives for good performance. Allison suffered a hand injury in a game against the Montreal Canadiens, and had to have surgery on his hand, which sidelined him for the remainder of the season. In the 66 games he played in before the injury, he scored 17 goals and had 60 points for the Maple Leafs.

After the 2005–06 season, Allison became an unrestricted free agent. Toronto chose not to re-sign Allison because GM John Ferguson, Jr. did not feel his skating was good enough. Allison subsequently did not sign with a team for the 2006–07 NHL season, as he wanted to be near his family and no situation arose where he could.

=== 2009 attempted comeback ===
On August 28, 2009, Allison received an invitation to the Toronto Maple Leafs' September 2009 training camp, and trained with them through the beginning of the preseason. Allison had not played professionally since 2005–06; in explaining the invitation, Brian Burke, the general manager of the Maple Leafs, said: "He had some personal issues and some major physical issues at that time. He has solved all of those. In my mind, he is a guy who might give us a lift and he deserves that opportunity."

In an interview after his first exhibition game back, Allison was as confident as ever. "I didn't contribute much, but that's to be expected, I'm just shaking the cobwebs off. I fully anticipate regaining my previous form as a point-per-game player."

Allison's bid to make the team on a tryout ended up falling short. The training camp invite yielded a memorable moment, when Allison fought with the Philadelphia Flyers' Darroll Powe during an exhibition game and ripped his helmet in half with his bare hands. It was not enough, however, and by September 28, Maple Leafs head coach Ron Wilson confessed that Allison was "out of the plans."

== Personal life ==
In retirement Allison operated a horse farm north of Toronto. He bought Reef Island on Lake Joseph in Ontario in 2004. Variety and Deadline in 2018 reported that Allison and his company Don Kee Productions were one of fourteen executive producers on the film Arkansas.

== Career statistics ==
=== Regular season and playoffs ===
| | | | Regular season | | | | | Playoffs |
| Season | Team | League | GP | G | A | Pts | PIM | GP | G | A | Pts | PIM |
|---|---|---|---|---|---|---|---|---|---|---|---|---|
| 1991–92 | London Knights | OHL | 65 | 11 | 19 | 30 | 15 | 7 | 0 | 0 | 0 | 0 |
| 1992–93 | London Knights | OHL | 66 | 42 | 76 | 118 | 50 | 12 | 7 | 13 | 20 | 8 |
| 1993–94 | London Knights | OHL | 56 | 55 | 87 | 142 | 68 | 5 | 2 | 13 | 15 | 13 |
| 1993–94 | Washington Capitals | NHL | 2 | 0 | 1 | 1 | 0 | — | — | — | — | — |
| 1994–95 | London Knights | OHL | 15 | 15 | 21 | 36 | 43 | — | — | — | — | — |
| 1994–95 | Portland Pirates | AHL | 8 | 5 | 4 | 9 | 2 | 7 | 3 | 8 | 11 | 2 |
| 1994–95 | Washington Capitals | NHL | 12 | 2 | 1 | 3 | 6 | — | — | — | — | — |
| 1995–96 | Portland Pirates | AHL | 57 | 28 | 41 | 69 | 42 | 6 | 1 | 6 | 7 | 9 |
| 1995–96 | Washington Capitals | NHL | 19 | 0 | 3 | 3 | 2 | — | — | — | — | — |
| 1996–97 | Washington Capitals | NHL | 53 | 5 | 17 | 22 | 25 | — | — | — | — | — |
| 1996–97 | Boston Bruins | NHL | 19 | 3 | 9 | 12 | 9 | — | — | — | — | — |
| 1997–98 | Boston Bruins | NHL | 81 | 33 | 50 | 83 | 60 | 6 | 2 | 6 | 8 | 4 |
| 1998–99 | Boston Bruins | NHL | 82 | 23 | 53 | 76 | 68 | 12 | 2 | 9 | 11 | 6 |
| 1999–00 | Boston Bruins | NHL | 37 | 10 | 18 | 28 | 20 | — | — | — | — | — |
| 2000–01 | Boston Bruins | NHL | 82 | 36 | 59 | 95 | 85 | — | — | — | — | — |
| 2001–02 | Los Angeles Kings | NHL | 73 | 19 | 55 | 74 | 68 | 7 | 3 | 3 | 6 | 4 |
| 2002–03 | Los Angeles Kings | NHL | 26 | 6 | 22 | 28 | 20 | — | — | — | — | — |
| 2005–06 | Toronto Maple Leafs | NHL | 66 | 17 | 43 | 60 | 76 | — | — | — | — | — |
| NHL totals | | | 552 | 154 | 331 | 485 | 441 | 25 | 7 | 18 | 25 | 14 |

=== International ===
| Year | Team | Event | GP | G | A | Pts | PIM |
|---|---|---|---|---|---|---|---|
| 1994 | Canada | WJC | 7 | 3 | 6 | 9 | 2 |
| 1995 | Canada | WJC | 7 | 3 | 12 | 15 | 6 |
| Junior totals | | | 14 | 6 | 18 | 24 | 8 |

== Awards and honours ==
| Award | Year |
|---|---|
OHL
| CHL First All-Star Team | 1994 |
| CHL Player of the Year | 1994 |
| CHL Top Scorer Award | 1994 |
| OHL First All-Star Team | 1994 |
| Red Tilson Trophy | 1994 |
| Eddie Powers Trophy | 1994 |
| William Hanley Trophy | 1994 |
NHL
| All-Star Game | 2001 |
| Named top 100 bruins of all time | 2023 |

| Preceded by Ray Bourque | Boston Bruins captain 2000–01 | Succeeded by Joe Thornton |
| Preceded by Pat Peake | CHL Player of the Year; 1994 | Succeeded by David Ling |
| Preceded by Brendan Witt | Washington Capitals first-round draft pick 1993 | Succeeded by Nolan Baumgartner |
