= 13th National Hockey League All-Star Game =

Professional ice hockey exhibition game

13th NHL All-Star Game
	1	2	3	Total
All-Star Team	0	1	0	1
Montreal Canadiens	0	2	4	6
- Date: October 3, 1959
- Arena: Montreal Forum
- City: Montreal
- Attendance: 13,818

The 13th National Hockey League All-Star Game took place at the Montreal Forum on October 3, 1959, which saw the hometown Montreal Canadiens defeat the NHL all-stars 6–1.

== Contracts and eligibility ==
A few of the game's top stars were absent from the game, due to a new NHL ruling that players be signed under contract in order to play in the all-star game. The intention of this clause was to intimidate players who were holding out from their team, a tactic that worked for Dickie Moore, Frank Mahovlich and George Armstrong, yet failed for others, resulting in All-Star coach Punch Imlach being unable to choose six of the best players (Tim Horton, Dick Duff, Bobby Hull, Tod Sloan, Pierre Pilote and Bob Pulford). Combined with six Montreal Canadiens being named to the First and Second team All-Stars, this meant that coach Imlach had to fill the voids with inferior players.

The subsequent snubbing of these players also went into the pre-game festivities, as they were also denied the multitude of gifts that traditionally was given to players in the game - including those already with their names engraved on it.

It was Maurice Richard's 13th consecutive appearance, making him the only player to that date who had appeared in all of the all-star games. He would retire after winning the Stanley Cup later that season. Montreal goaltender Jacques Plante appeared in the game without a mask, despite his intention of wearing one throughout the season.

== Game summary ==
	Montreal Canadiens	All-Stars
Final score	6	1
Head coach	Toe Blake	Punch Imlach (Toronto Maple Leafs)
Lineup	1 - G Jacques Plante; 2 - D Doug Harvey; 4 - C Jean Beliveau; 5 - RW Bernie Geoffrion; 6 - C Ralph Backstrom; 8 - RW Bill Hicke; 9 - RW Maurice Richard (Captain); 10 - D Tom Johnson; 11 - D Bob Turner; 12 - RW Dickie Moore; 14 - RW Claude Provost; 15 - LW Ab McDonald; 16 - C Henri Richard; 18 - LW Marcel Bonin; 19 - D Al Langlois; 20 - C Phil Goyette; 21 - D J. C. Tremblay; 22 - LW Don Marshall; 23 - LW Andre Pronovost	First team All-Stars: 4 - D Bill Gadsby (New York Rangers); 8 - RW Andy Bathgate (New York Rangers); Second team All-Stars: 1 - G Terry Sawchuk (Detroit Red Wings); 3 - D Marcel Pronovost (Detroit Red Wings); 9 - RW Gordie Howe (Detroit Red Wings); 10 - C Alex Delvecchio (Detroit Red Wings); Other players: 5 - D Carl Brewer (Toronto Maple Leafs); 7 - C Red Sullivan (New York Rangers); 11 - RW Jerry Toppazzini (Boston Bruins); 14 - D Fern Flaman (Boston Bruins); 15 - LW Frank Mahovlich (Toronto Maple Leafs); 16 - LW Bert Olmstead (Toronto Maple Leafs); 17 - LW Ed Litzenberger (Chicago Black Hawks); 18 - C Don McKenney (Boston Bruins); 19 - D Doug Mohns (Boston Bruins); 24 - RW George Armstrong (Toronto Maple Leafs)
Scoring summary	Beliveau (Hicke, Harvey) 4:25 2nd; McDonald (Backstrom, Geoffrion) 13:43 2nd; Moore (H. Richard, Johnson) 7:44 3rd; H. Richard (Moore, Harvey) 9:31 3rd; Beliveau (Hicke, Bonin) 11:34 3rd; Pronovost (Harvey) 15:31	McKenney (Litzenberger) 18:30 2nd
Penalties	Tremblay 8:43 3rd; Turner 12:45 3rd	Bathgate 9:21 3rd
Win/loss	Jacques Plante	Terry Sawchuk

Shots on goal
Montreal	9	14	10	33
All-Stars	14	16	5	35

- Referee: Frank Udvari
- Linesmen: George Hayes, Bob Frampton
- Attendance: 13,818

== See also ==
- 1959–60 NHL season
