= October 1924 =

Month of 1924

<<	October 1924					>>
Su	Mo	Tu	We	Th	Fr	Sa
			1	2	3	4
5	6	7	8	9	10	11
12	13	14	15	16	17	18
19	20	21	22	23	24	25
26	27	28	29	30	31

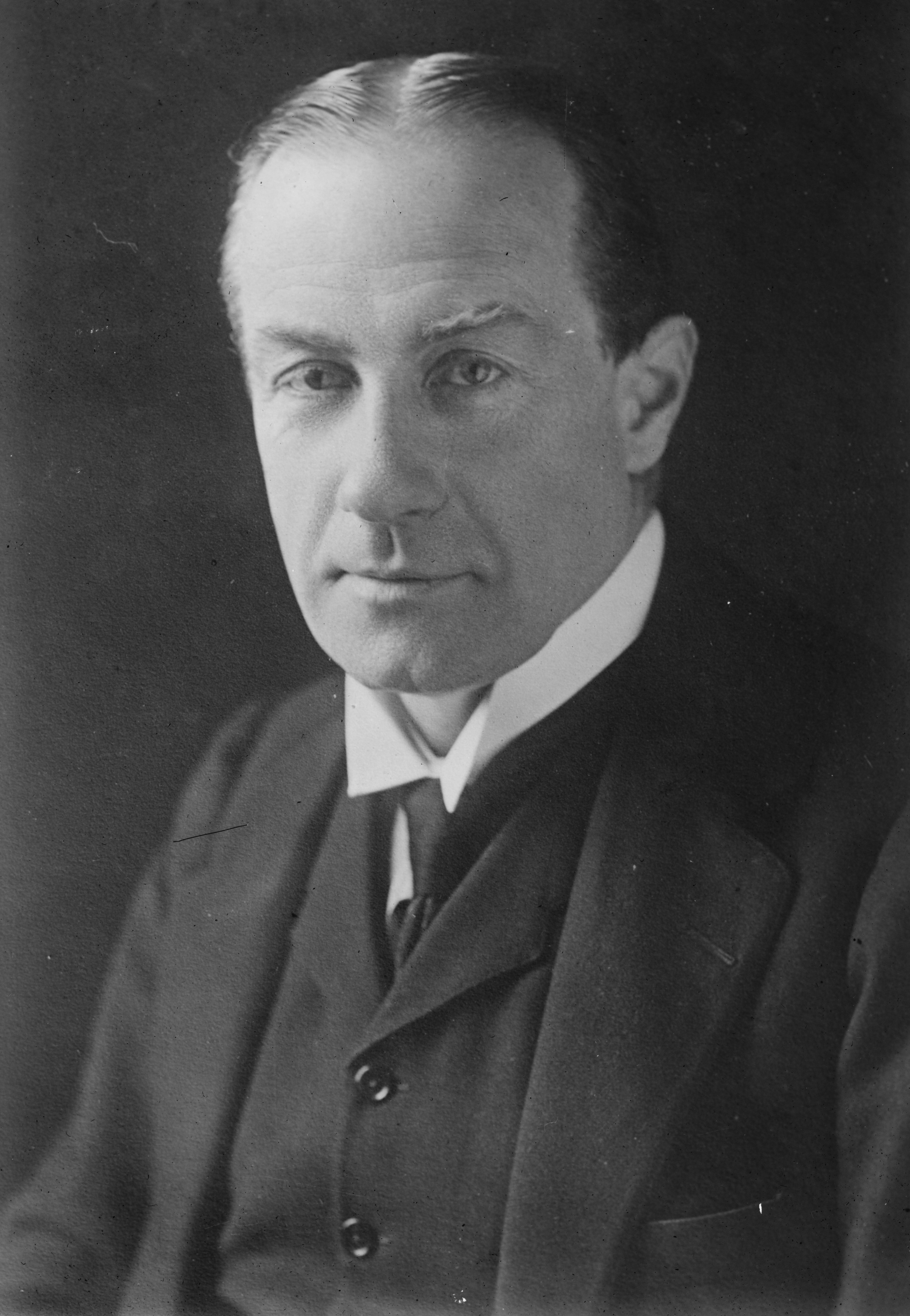
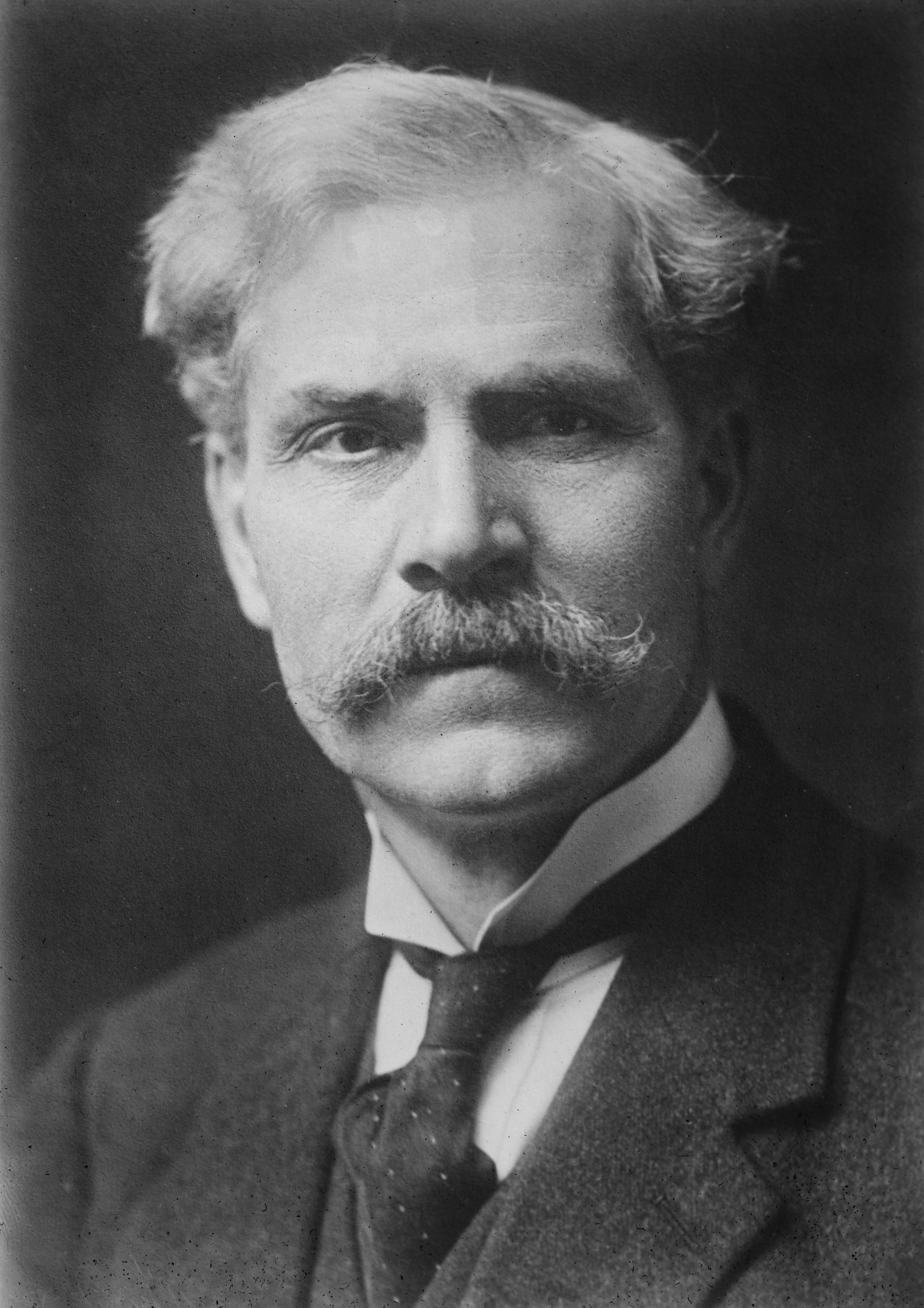
October 29, 1924: Conservative Stanley Baldwin returned to power in the UK as Prime Minister Ramsay MacDonald's Labour Party defeated in elections for the House of Commons

The following events occurred in October 1924:

== October 1, 1924 (Wednesday) ==
- Ireland's Defence Forces (Óglaigh na hÉireann) were formed within the Irish Free State by the unification of the Irish Army, the Irish Naval Service, the Irish Air Corps and the Reserve Defence Forces.
- Stanley Baldwin's Conservative Party tabled a motion of censure against Prime Minister Ramsay MacDonald and his Labour government over its handling of the Campbell Case. The UK Liberal Party broke from its coalition with Labour and announced that the Liberals would not vote to ratify the treaties that the UK had signed with the Soviet Union.
- Baseball commissioner Kenesaw Mountain Landis banned New York Giants player Jimmy O'Connell and coach Cozy Dolan over a bribery scandal. They were charged with offering Philadelphia Phillies shortstop Heinie Sand $500 to throw a game on September 27 to help the Giants win the National League pennant.
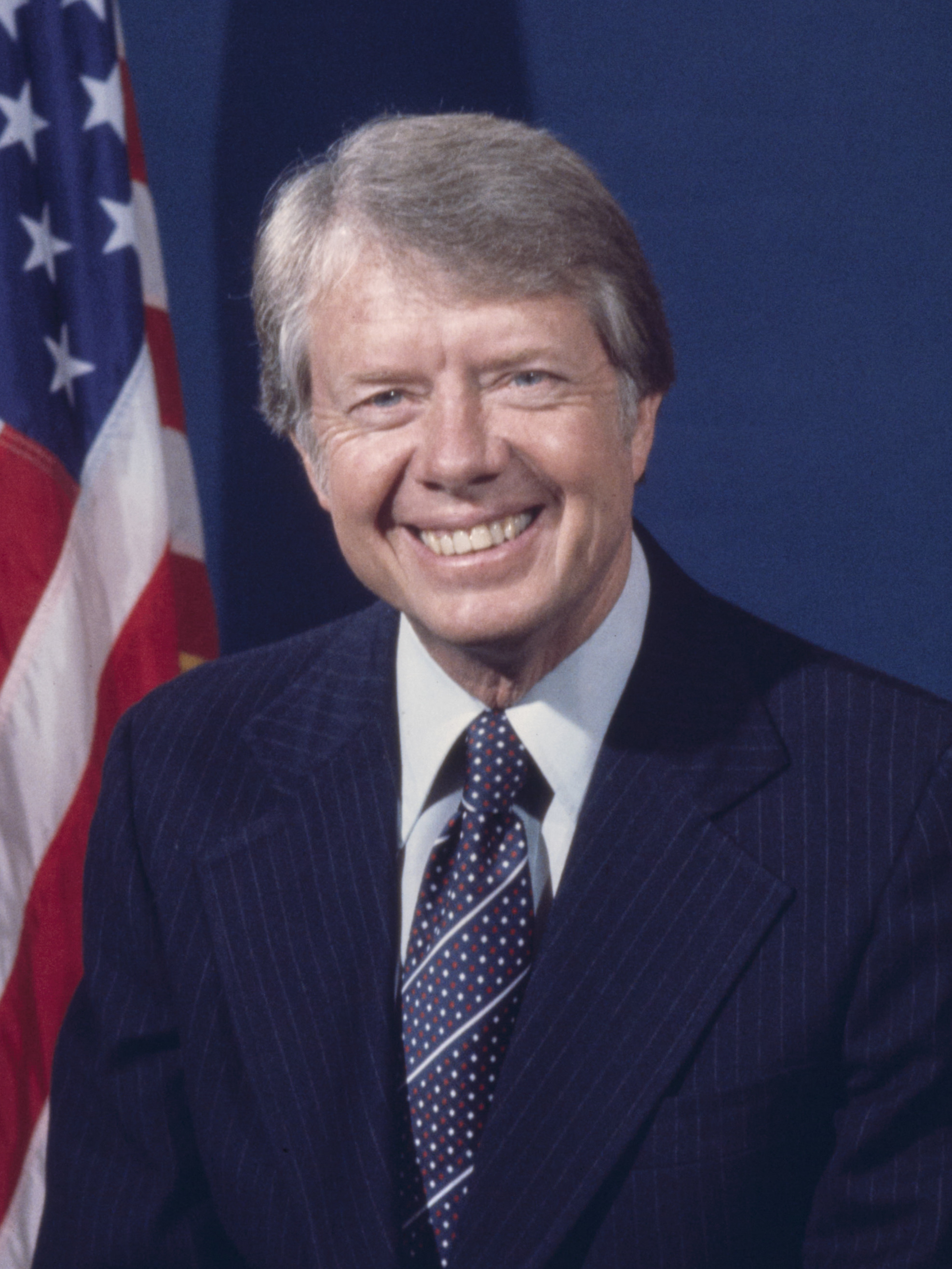
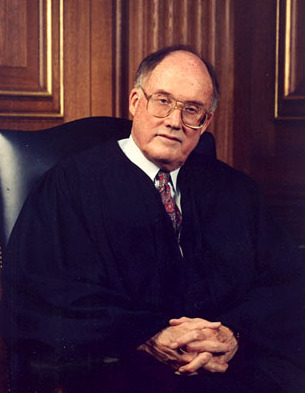
President Carter and Justice Rehnquist, born 10/01/1924
- Born:
  - Jimmy Carter, 39th President of the United States, from 1977 to 1981; in Plains, Georgia (d. 2024)
  - William Rehnquist, 16th Chief Justice of the United States from 1986 to 2005, Associate U.S. Supreme Court Justice, 1972–1986; in Milwaukee, Wisconsin (d. 2005)
  - Gerry O'Hara, British film director; in Boston, Lincolnshire (d. 2023)
  - Bob Geigel, American professional wrestling promoter and three time president of the National Wrestling Alliance (NWA) between 1978 and 1987; in Algona, Iowa (d. 2014)
- Died:
  - Charles C. Smith, 64, African American boxer and holder of the World Colored Heavyweight Championship from 1876 to 1878
  - John Quiller Rowett, 48, British philanthropist, committed suicide after several business failures.

== October 2, 1924 (Thursday) ==
- The Geneva Protocol for the Pacific Settlement of International Disputes received preliminary approval at the League of Nations. The agreement required formal approval to be given by all governments concerned, and was understood to have little meaning until the conclusion of the world disarmament conference was concluded the next year. The Protocol included a very controversial piece of wording added at the insistence of Japan, which allowed for the restriction of immigration to become a matter of international jurisdiction if it endangered the peace.
- Cesáreo Onzari of the Argentina national football team scored the first goal from a corner kick in international play after the rules of soccer football had been amended on June 14 by the International Football Association Board. The first goal in a professional league game had come on August 23. Onzari's goal came against Uruguay, which had recently won the 1924 Olympic title. For this reason the direct goal from a corner kick is called an Olympic goal or gol olímpico in Latin America.
- Baseball commissioner Kenesaw Mountain Landis said the World Series would go forward despite the bribery scandal. "Inside of four days after the attempted bribery of Sand of the Phillies had occurred, the guilty persons had been placed on baseball's ineligible list. Surely our speedy action in the matter must indicate that the game is being kept clean", he said.
- Died: William B. Ross, 50, Governor of Wyoming since 1923, died of complications from an appendectomy he had undergone one week earlier. He was temporarily succeeded by Secretary of State Frank Lucas pending a special election Governor Ross's widow, Nellie Tayloe Ross, ran in the election and won the governorship.

== October 3, 1924 (Friday) ==
- Britain's Evening Standard blasted the Geneva Protocol and called on Australia, Canada and New Zealand to quit the League of Nations over it, pointing out that if Australia refused to submit to Japan's demand that it alter its immigration policy, the British fleet might be called upon to impose a naval blockade in the name of the League.
- A conference in London between the United Kingdom and Egypt on the issue of Egyptian independence ended without success.
- A feud erupted between major league baseball commissioner Kenesaw Mountain Landis and American League president Ban Johnson. Johnson told the media that he would pursue an independent investigation of the circumstances under which the New York Giants won the pennant, and that they should be forbidden from playing in the World Series. Johnson called Landis a "wild-eyed, crazy nut" who was "protecting the crooks" by failing to investigate the scandal more thoroughly.
- Born:
  - Harvey Kurtzman, American cartoonist and writer known for being the original editor of Mad magazine; in Brooklyn (d. 1993)
  - Betty Lee Sung, Asian American rights activist; in Baltimore (d. 2023)

== October 4, 1924 (Saturday) ==
- In the Second Zhili–Fengtian War, Zhang Zuolin won a major victory at Fengtian.
- The First Division Monument was dedicated in Washington, D.C. During his dedication speech, U.S. President Calvin Coolidge briefly commenting on the Geneva Protocol, saying, "We do not propose to entrust to any other power or combination of powers any authority to make up our minds for us."
- Died: Burt E. Skeel, 30, American racing pilot, was killed while competing in the Pulitzer Trophy Race at Wilbur Wright Field in Dayton, Ohio. Skeel's Curtiss Aircraft flyer lost both wings as he was traveling at high speed at an atltitude of 2,000 feet (610 m).

== October 5, 1924 (Sunday) ==
- A harsh ordinance was issued in British India aimed at suppressing "terrorists". Pro-independence nationalists such as Subhas Chandra Bose would be arrested under the new law.
- Carlos José Solórzano was elected to be President of Nicaragua, to take office on January 1.
- Seven people died and 48 were injured during rioting in Camagüey, Cuba, during a political rally for presidential candidate Mario Menocal ahead of the country's general election.
- Born:
  - I. Robert Lehman, Lithuanian-born American biochemist; in Tauragė (d. 2026)
  - Bob Thaves, American comic strip artist known for Frank and Ernest; in Burt, Iowa (d. 2006)

== October 6, 1924 (Monday) ==
- Radio Marconi, the first radio station in Italy for the general public, began broadcasting from Rome as a service of Unione radiofonica italiana (URI). The station, with call sign 1-RO, transmitted at the 425 metre wavelength, equivalent to the 710 AM radio frequency. At 9:00 in the evening, Maria Luisa Boncompagni read an announcement that the first program would be an "inaugural symphony concert", followed by an introduction by Ines Viviani Donarelli that she and three other members of a string quartet would perform Joseph Haydn's Opus 7.
- Ali of Hejaz was proclaimed the new King of Hejaz after his father, King Hussein bin Ali fled from Mecca to Jeddah to avoid the conquest of Nejd by the neighboring Sultanate of Nejd, led by Ibn Saud.
- The classic German silent film Das Wachsfigurenkabinett (Waxworks), directed by Paul Leni, premiered in Austria.
- Born:
  - Margaret Fulton, Scottish-born Australian food writer; in Nairn, County of Nairn (d. 2019)
  - Chris Rogers, Canadian horse racing jockey who won 2,043 races including the Queen's Plate in 1949, 1950 and 1954, later an inductee to the Canadian Horse Racing Hall of Fame; in Hamilton, Ontario (d. 1976)

== October 7, 1924 (Tuesday) ==
- The British Labour Party ruled out affiliation with the Communist Party by a card vote of 3,185,000 to 193,000 at Labour's national congress in London. "Communism is nothing practical. It is a product of czarism and war betrayal, and as such we will have nothing to do with it", Prime Minister Ramsay MacDonald said.
- The Soviet Union's Council of People's Commissars, the Sovnarkom, declared an amnesty to all participants of the recent August Uprising against the Georgian Soviet Socialist Republic on the condition that they surrender their weapons voluntarily.
- The United States accepted diplomatic relations with the Irish Free State, separately from the United Kingdom, as Timothy Smiddy was accepted by the U.S. as Minister Plenipotentiary from Ireland, with an office in Washington, D.C. The U.S. would not send a diplomat to Ireland until 1927.
- Born:
  - Yu Chi-song, South Korean politician and 1981 presidential candidate; in Pyeongtaek (d. 2006)
  - Joyce Reynolds, American film actress and the star of the 1944 film Janie; in San Antonio, Texas (d. 2019)
- Died:
  - T. E. Collcutt, 84, English architect
  - Charles L. Hutchinson, 70, American philanthropist and founder of the Art Institute of Chicago

== October 8, 1924 (Wednesday) ==
- Ramsay MacDonald and his Labour Party were defeated in the House of Commons by a vote of 364 to 198, on a vote of censure over the government's handling of the Campbell Case.
- Born:
  - Alphons Egli, President of Switzerland in 1986; in Lucerne (d. 2016)
  - John Nelder, British statistician known for the Nelder–Mead method; in Brushford, Somerset, England (d. 2010)
  - Lucy Bhreatnach (nee Maria de la Piedad Lucila Hellman), Basque-Spanish born Irish educator and language activist, co-founder of the very first Irish-language school (gaelscoil) in the Republic of Ireland, the Scoil Lorcáin (1949); in Algorta (d. 2007)
  - Al Fritz, American bicycle designer for the Schwinn Bicycle Company, known for the popular Schwinn Sting-Ray bike; in Chicago (d. 2013)
  - Paul H. Silverman, American medical researcher known for his discoveries on stem cells and on the human genome; in Minneapolis (d. 2004)

== October 9, 1924 (Thursday) ==
- In the UK, King George V dissolved parliament at the request of Prime Minister Ramsay MacDonald, and scheduled new elections for the House of Commons for October 29.
- Soldier Field, a stadium with 60,000 seats, was dedicated in Chicago, as Grant Park Stadium. The stadium, which would become home to the NFL's Chicago Bears, would be renamed Soldier Field on Veterans Day in 1925.
- Born:
  - Navvab Safavi (alias for Sayyid Mojtaba Mir-Lohi), Iranian Shia cleric and founder of the Fadayan-e Islam, known for ordering the assassinations of three Iranian Prime Ministers, two of them successfully; in Ghaniabad, Tehran (executed 1956)
  - USAF Major General Robert A. Rushworth, American test pilot who was the most frequent operator of the North American X-15 experimental spaceplane for the Air Force and for NASA; in Madison, Maine (d. 1993)
  - Melvyn R. Paisley, U.S. Department of the Navy assistant secretary from 1981 to 1987, later convicted of accepting bribes while in office; in Portland, Oregon (d. 2001)
- Died: Jake Daubert, 40, American baseball player, 1913 National League Most Valuable Player, died of surgical complications from an appendectomy after avoiding surgery in order to play in the Cincinnati Reds' final home game.

== October 10, 1924 (Friday) ==
- Walter Johnson pitched four shutout innings of relief as the Washington Senators beat the New York Giants, 4 to 3, in 12 innings to win the World Series in a winner-take-all Game 7. This game is considered by some sports historians to be one of the greatest baseball games ever played and the conclusion of one of the most exciting World Series of all time.
- The Commonwealth Electoral Act made compulsory voting the law in Australia.
- The Office of the Secretary of State for Foreign Affairs in the United Kingdom received the fabricated Zinoviev letter, purporting to be a directive from the Soviet Union's director of Comintern to order the Communist Party of Great Britain to undermine the British government. The letter came two days after the vote of no confidence against Prime Minister MacDonald and was leaked by Conservative Party members within the Foreign Office to the local news media, including the Daily Mail newspaper, in advance of the elections set for October 29.
- Born:
  - Ed Wood, American filmmaker known for Plan 9 from Outer Space, later profiled in a 1994 feature film; in Poughkeepsie, New York (d. 1978)
  - Umar Wirahadikusumah, Vice President of Indonesia from 1983 to 1988; in Soemedang, Dutch East Indies (d. 2003)

== October 11, 1924 (Saturday) ==
- The H. J. Heinz Company celebrated its fifty-fifth birthday with banquets in different American cities. President Calvin Coolidge used the occasion to make a radio address from the White House about business that was carried in 70 cities.
- Baseball commissioner Kenesaw Mountain Landis made his first public response to Ban Johnson's criticisms of his handling of the recent bribery scandal, saying, "Answer Johnson? I don't have to... it has been done by the President of the United States." Calvin Coolidge, who attended three of the games played in Washington, said that "The contests which I witnessed maintained throughout a high degree of skill and every evidence of a high class of sportsmanship that will bring to every observer an increased respect for and confidence in our national game."
- Born:
  - Mal Whitfield, American athlete, 1948 and 1952 Olympic gold medalist in the 800m race; in Bay City, Texas (d. 2015)
  - John Sheardown, Canadian diplomat assigned to the Embassy in Iran, known for sheltering several American Embassy workers who had escaped capture during the Iran hostage crisis; in Sandwich, Ontario (d. 2012)
- Died:
  - Richard Morris, 62, American opera singer and stage and silent film actor
  - Sydney E. Mudd, 39, U.S. Congressman for Maryland since 1915, died two days after being hospitalized for of an intestinal obstruction. Mudd had been campaigning for re-election when he became ill.

== October 12, 1924 (Sunday) ==
Moldavian SSR

- The Moldavian Autonomous Soviet Socialist Republic, later one of the 15 constituent union republics of the Soviet Union and now the independent Republic of Moldova, was created within the Soviet Union.
- The silent film Helen's Babies, starring Edward Everett Horton, Baby Peggy (Diana Serra Cary), Jeanne Carpenter and Clara Bow, was released.
- Born: Pieter Kasteleyn, Netherlands physicist known for his contributions to the field of statistical mechanics known for the Fortuin-Kasteleyn-Ginibre inequality (FKG inequality); in Leiden (d. 1996)

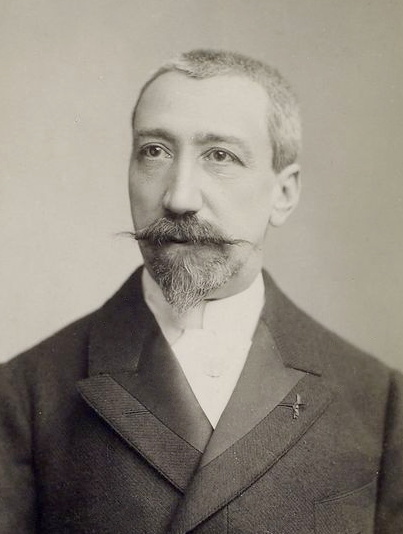
Anatole France

- Died: Anatole France (pen name for Jacques-Anatole Thibault), 80, French novelist awarded the 1921 Nobel Prize in Literature.

== October 13, 1924 (Monday) ==
- The holy city of Mecca was captured by the Wahhabi Muslims in the Saudi conquest of Hejaz by the Saudi kingdom of Nejd.
- The National Hockey League, which consisted solely of Canadian teams for its first seven seasons, became international for the first time with the addition of an American team. Charles Adams, a U.S. businessman and owner of a chain of grocery stores purchased one of the NHL's first two expansion franchises for $15,000 (equivalent to $269,000 in 2024 and named his team the Boston Bruins.
- The Buster Keaton comedy film The Navigator was released.
- Henry Ford withdrew his long-stalled bid to buy the nitrate works and dam at Muscle Shoals, Alabama.
- Born: Roberto Viola, President of Argentina during 1981, later imprisoned for seven years for human rights violations committed during Argentina's Dirty War; in Buenos Aires (d. 1994)

== October 14, 1924 (Tuesday) ==
- The Tajik Autonomous Soviet Socialist Republic, which would later become the independent nation of Tajikistan, was created as a partially self-governing entity with the new Uzbek SSR in the Soviet Union. It would become the Tadzhik Soviet Socialist Republic and one of the constituent republics of the Soviet Union on December 5, 1929, and become independent upon the breakup of the Soviet Union in 1991.
- Hjalmar Branting formed a government as the new Prime Minister of Sweden after the resignation of Ernst Trygger, whose coalition government had lost power in the September elections for the Riksdag. Terminally ill, Branting would serve for less than three months before resigning in favor of Commerce and Industry Minister Rickard Sandler.
- Born:
  - Michel Mirowski (Mordechai Frydman), Polish-born Israeli physician and inventor of the implantable cardioverter-defibrillator (ICD); in Warsaw (died of multiple myeloma, 1990)
  - John E. Corbally, American academic administrator who served President of the University of Illinois System, 1971 to 1979, before becoming the first President of the John D. and Catherine T. MacArthur Foundation, 1979 to 1989; in South Bend, Washington (d. 2004)
  - Robert Webber, American film and TV actor; in Santa Ana, California (died of ALS, 1989)
- Died: Frank B. Brandegee, 60, U.S. Senator for Connecticut since 1905, committed suicide by gas inhalation

== October 15, 1924 (Wednesday) ==
- The first Surrealist Manifesto was published.

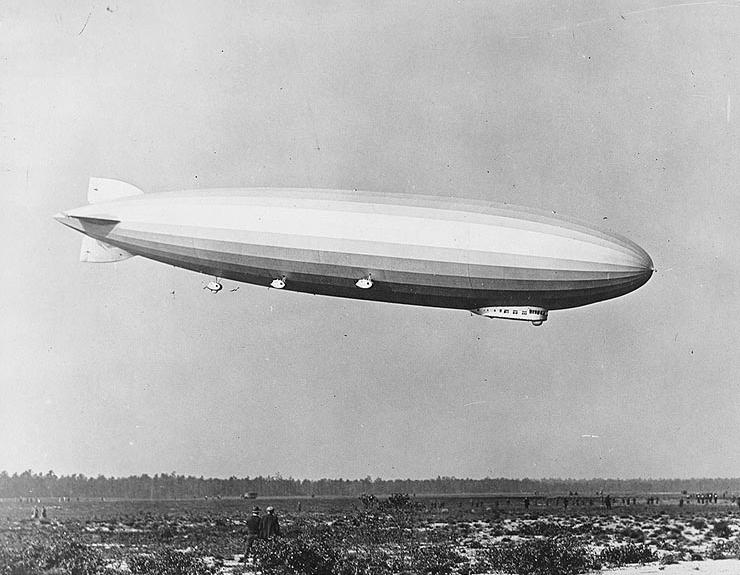
USS Los Angeles arriving at Lakehurst

- The U.S. Navy dirigible USS Los Angeles arrived in the United States at Lakehurst Naval Station at 9:52 in the morning, 81 hours after departing from its German construction site at Friedrichshafen.
- The Prince of Wales arrived in Toronto from Detroit and participated in a fox hunt.
- Born:
  - Lee Iacocca, American automobile executive known for the revival of the financially-ailing Chrysler Corporation and for the development of the Ford Mustang; in Allentown, Pennsylvania (d. 2019)
  - Minoru Yoneyama, Japanese businessman and founder of the sports equipment company Yonex; in Koshiji, Niigata Prefecture (d. 2019)
  - Mark Lenard (stage name for Leonard Rosenson), American TV and film actor, known for his roles in Star Trek and its sequels; in Chicago (d. 1996)

== October 16, 1924 (Thursday) ==
- In Germany, Adolf Hitler, incarcerated for organizing the 1923 attempt to overthrow the Weimar Republic government, had a statement printed admitting that he was born in the Austro-Hungarian Empire rather than in Germany. Hitler, who was facing deportation back to Austria, argued that he had lost his Austrian citizenship after volunteering to serve in the German Army during World War I and said that "I never felt as an Austrian citizen but always as a German only... It was this mentality that made me draw the ultimate conclusion and do military service in the German Army. Hitler would not renounce his Austrian citizenship until April 7, 1925, and would not become a citizen of Germany until 1932 upon his appointment as a state government official.
- The blues standard "See See Rider" was first recorded, by Ma Rainey.
- Born: Gerard Parkes, Irish-born Canadian TV and film actor; in Dublin (d. 2014)
- Died: Paul-Louis Delance, 76, French painter

== October 17, 1924 (Friday) ==
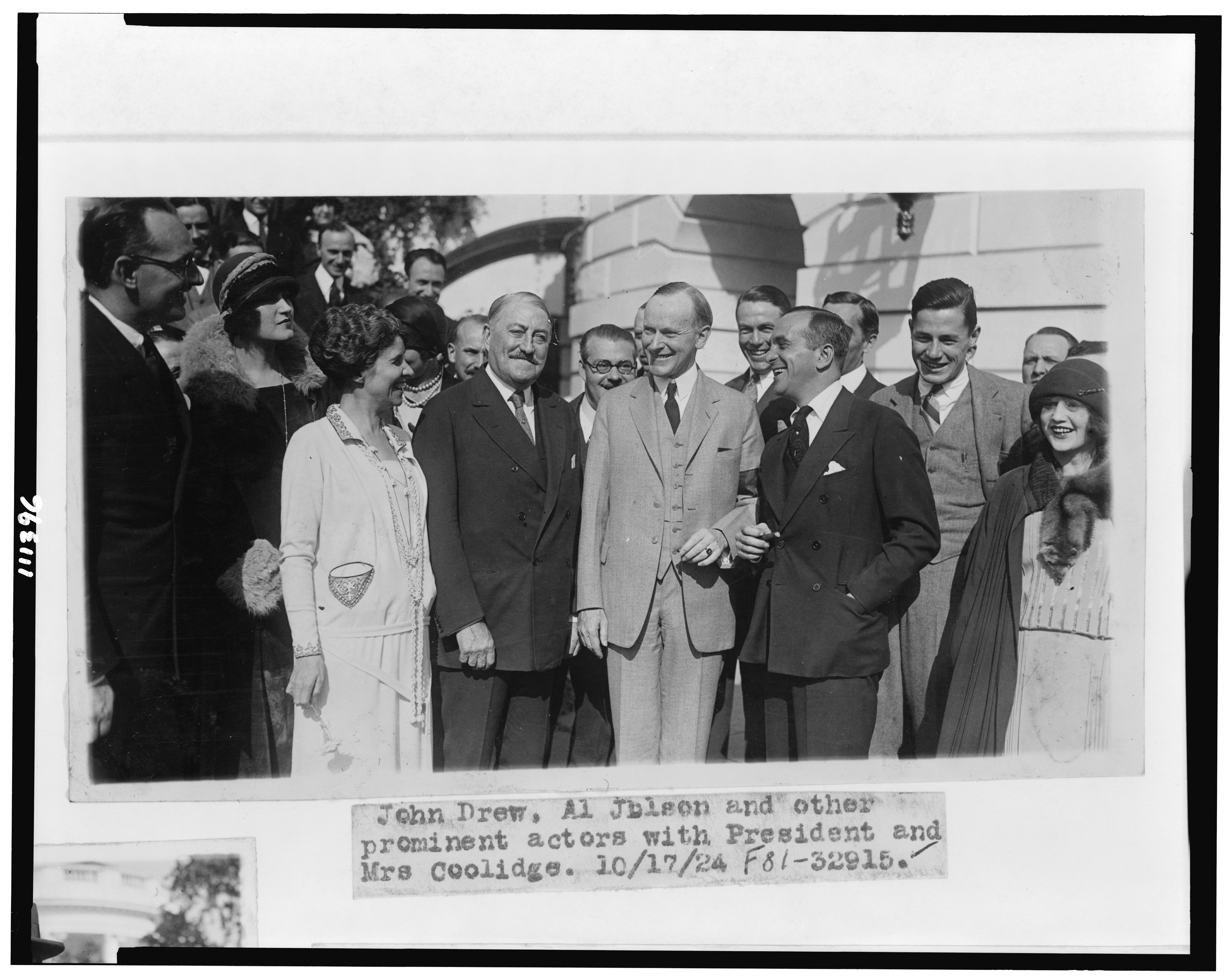
President Coolidge with celebrity actors

- The first media event in a U.S. presidential campaign took place 18 days before the November 4 election day as President Calvin Coolidge hosted a breakfast at the White House for an all-star cast of Broadway actors and actresses, including Al Jolson, Ed Wynn, John Drew Jr., Raymond Hitchcock, Charlotte Greenwood and Francine Larrimore. The breakfast, the brainchild of public relations specialist Edward Bernays, marked a groundbreaking example of a staged attempt to improve a politician's image by having him associate with popular celebrities. Bernays would recall decades later that "In 1924 this was a startling idea," and that the "non-event" of celebrity entertainers counteracted Coolidge's sour personality.
- A group of politicians, dissatisfied with the Republic of Turkey being a one-party state, organized a competitor to the Republican People's Party (Cumhuriyet Halk Partisi or CHP) of President Mustafa Kemal Atatürk. Created by Kâzım Karabekir, the rival Progressive Republican Party (Teraḳḳîperver Cumhûriyet Fırḳası or TCF) would last for less than seven months before being banned on June 5, 1925.

== October 18, 1924 (Saturday) ==
- The first "round-the-world" wireless radio communication took place between locations in New Zealand and the United Kingdom as favorable atmospheric conditions permitted amateur ham radio operators to hear each other over a distance of more than 19,000 kilometres (12,000 mi). Amateurs in both countries heard signals the night before. Transmitting on the 80-metre short wave band from New Zealand, at Waiheua near Dunedin, New Zealand, telegraphed the message, in Morse code, "Z4AA calling. Pass the following to Radio Society of Great Britain. Greetings from New Zealand. Z4AA calling. Pass following to G2OD. Your signals strong last night." Mr. E. J. Simmonds of Gerrards Cross, Buckinghamshire in England, operator of G2OD, acknowledged the call from Z4AA and asked for confirmation by cable. A little more than five hours later, he was handed a message from Dell that said, "Congratulations on first trans-world message. Dell. Waiheua, Dunedin, New Zealand." Later in the day, Cecil W. Goyder of Hendon, near London exchanged messages with Mr. Bell "for over an hour."
- In one of the most anticipated games of the 1924 college football season, played before 60,000 at the Polo Grounds stadium in New York City, Notre Dame defeated Army, 13 to 7.
- Police in Berlin put on a media display of all the evidence they had uncovered of a "false passport factory" that communist agents used to operate in the United States and other countries under false identities.
- U.S. President Coolidge had authorized the "President's Cup" to be awarded to the winner of the Army–Navy Game.
- Born:
  - Allyn Ferguson, American film score and TV theme music composer; in San Jose, California (d. 2010)
  - Arthur J. Jackson, U.S. Marine who received the Medal of Honor for his heroism in the Battle of Peleliu; in Cleveland (d. 2017)
- Died: Giovanni Ancillotto, 27, Italian World War I flying ace with 11 confirmed victories, was killed in an auto accident in Italy near the town of Caravaggio, Lombardy.

== October 19, 1924 (Sunday) ==
- The 1924 Cuba hurricane, the earliest officially classified Category 5 Atlantic hurricane, struck western Cuba in Pinar del Río Province and killed 90 people.
- The day after Notre Dame's defeat of Army in football, sportswriter Grantland Rice's famous newspaper account was published nationwide. "Outlined against a blue-gray October sky," Rice wrote, "the Four Horsemen rode again. In dramatic lore they are known as famine, pestilence, destruction and death. These are only aliases. Their real names are: Stuhldreher, Miller, Crowley and Layden."
- The film The Border Legion, based on the 1916 novel by Zane Grey and starring Antonio Moreno and Helene Chadwick premiered in New York City, before being released nationwide by Paramount Pictures.
- Antonio Ascari of Italy won the Italian Grand Prix.
- Born:
  - Lubomír Štrougal, Prime Minister of Czechoslovakia from 1970 to 1988; in Veselí nad Lužnicí, Czechoslovakia (now in the Czech Republic) (d. 2023)
  - Rosemary Bamforth, Scottish pathologist who made the link between mesothelioma and asbestos exposure while researching the disease in former ship workers; in Glasgow (d. 2018)
- Died: Count Louis Zborowski, 29, English race car driver and automobile engineer known for designing the Chitty Bang Bang car, was killed in a crash during the Italian Grand Prix at the Monza Raceway in Milan.

== October 20, 1924 (Monday) ==
- The Hilldale Club (near Philadelphia) of the Eastern Colored League (ECL) defeated the Kansas City Monarchs of the Negro National League, 5 to 0, to win the championship baseball game of the best-5-of-9 Colored World Series, five games to four.
- German President Friedrich Ebert dissolved the Reichstag and called for new elections on December 7. The cabinet of Chancellor Wilhelm Marx fell apart after he granted three seats to nationalist parties in exchange for their voting to ratify the Dawes Plan, and the various factions were unable to cooperate afterward.
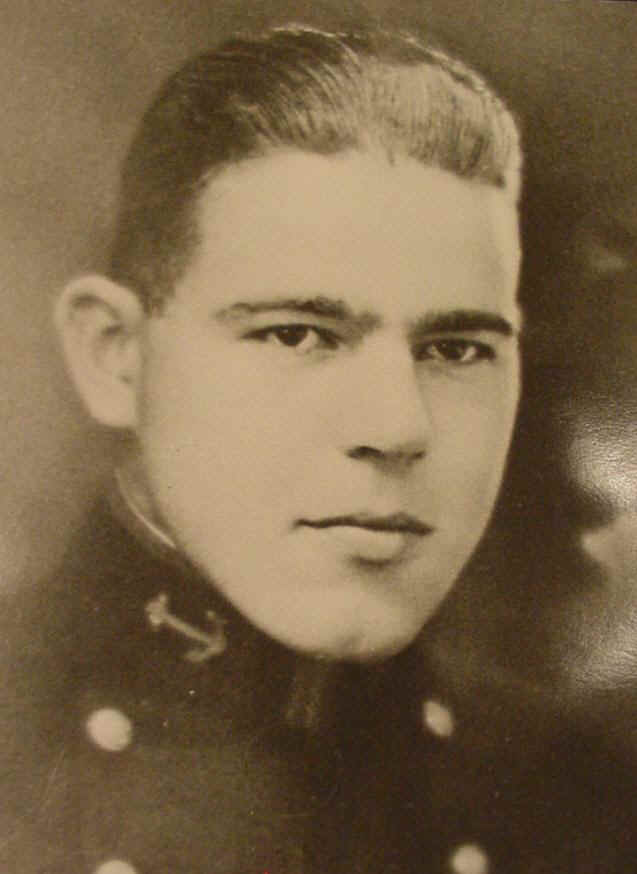
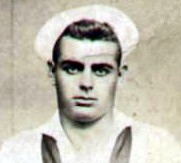
Ensign Drexler and Boatswain's Mate Cholister
- An explosion of gunpowder killed 14 servicemen on the U.S. Navy light cruiser USS Trenton as it was conducting gunnery drills off the Virginia Capes. Ensign Henry Clay Drexler, 23, and Boatswain's Mate, First Class, George Robert Cholister, 25, attempted to dump the powder charges into an immersion tank before they detonated; the explosion killed Drexler instantly, and Cholister died the following day. Both men would be posthumously awarded the Medal of Honor.
- In central Africa, the former German colony of Ruanda-Urundi became League of Nations mandate territory under the administration of Belgium, which controlled the neighboring colony of the Belgian Congo. With a capital at Usumbura (now Bujumbura in Burundi), the mandate would later be divided into the nations of Rwanda (speakers of the Kinyarwanda Bantu dialect) and Burundi (speakers of the Kirundi Bantu dialect).
- The National Association of Schools of Music (NASM) was founded by leaders from six American music schools at a convention in Pittsburgh.

== October 21, 1924 (Tuesday) ==
- Elections were held for the 150 seats of Norway's parliament, the Storting. The coalition government of the conservative Conservative Party (Høyre) and the liberal Venstre, led by Prime Minister Johan Ludwig Mowinckel), maintained its slim majority, with 77 seats.
- The first elections in Canada under the "Indian Act" were held for the Six Nations Band of Indians Council, a partially self-governing territory that served as a Canadian government forced replacement of the traditional Six Nations Iroquois Confederacy (the Haudenosaunee). The council had representatives for the Mohawk, Oneida, Onondaga, Cayuga, Seneca and Tuscarora people. The Council's first meeting was subsequently held the next day at the Iroquois capital in Ohsweken, Ontario.
- The German National People's Party issued an official proclamation announcing itself in favour of restoring the monarchy and terminating the Treaty of Versailles and the Dawes Plan.
- Born:
  - Joyce Randolph (stage name for Joyce Sirola), American TV actress best known for portraying Trixie Norton on The Honeymooners; in Detroit (d. 2024)
  - Franz Muhri, leader of the Communist Party of Austria from 1965 to 1990; in Steyregg (d. 2001)
  - Chin Peng, leader of the Malayan Communist Party from 1947 to 1989; in Sitiawan, Straits Settlements, British Malaya (d. 2013)

== October 22, 1924 (Wednesday) ==
- The Toastmasters International club was founded by Ralph C. Smedley with the opening in Santa Ana, California, of the first Toastmasters Club.
- William Joyce, a member of the British Fascists, was slashed with a razor by a communist hooligan while stewarding a meeting of Conservatives in North Lambeth, London. William Joyce would later gain notoriety as Nazi propagandist "Lord Haw-Haw".

== October 23, 1924 (Thursday) ==
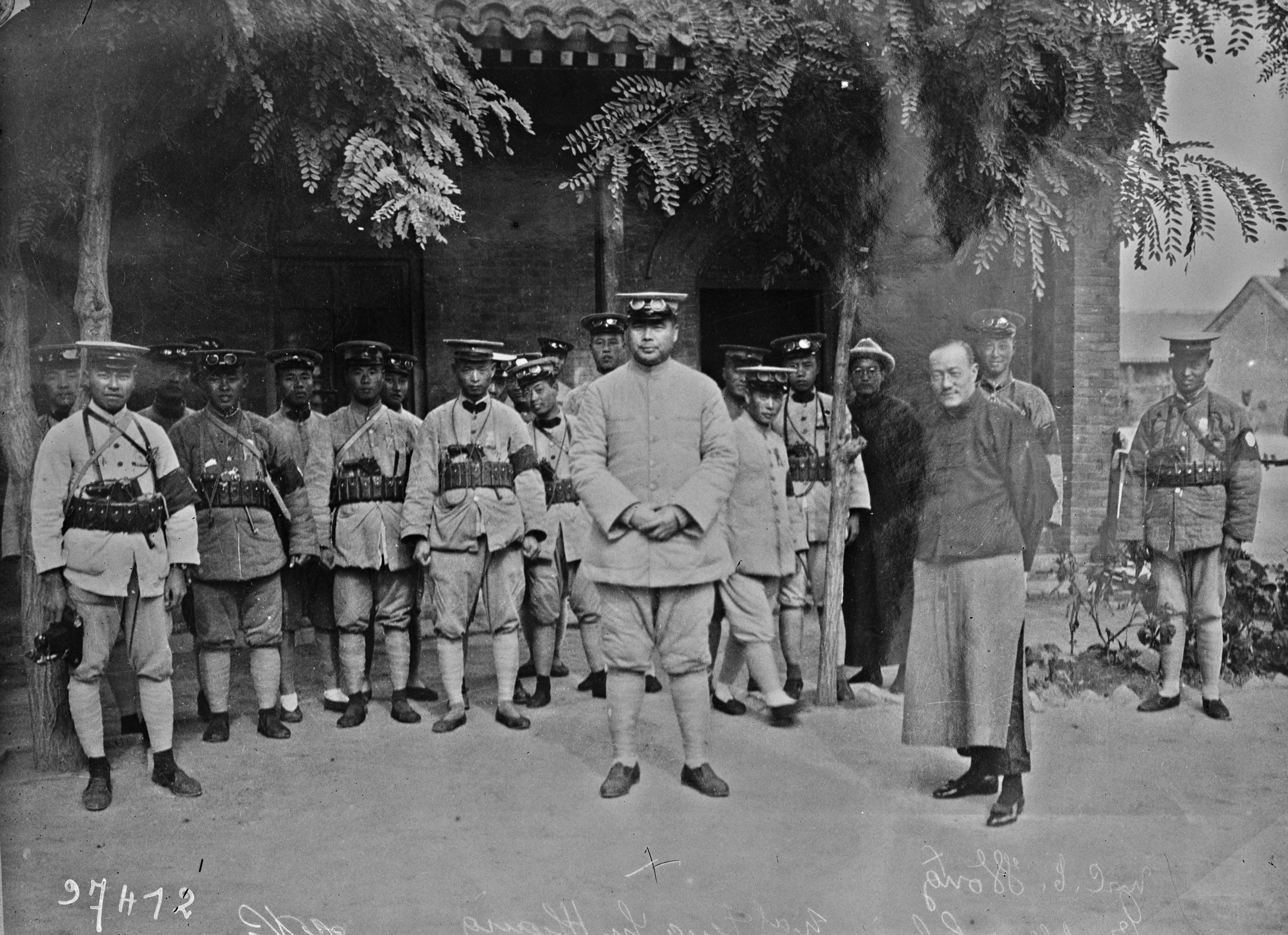
General Feng after the coup d'etat

- General Feng Yuxiang, leading the 11th Division of the Chinese Army, carried out the Beijing Coup, arriving in China's capital and taking the city unopposed and overthrowing President Cao Kun. Feng's troops halted all railway traffic and cut telephone and telegraph communications, then set up a temporary dictatorship. After issuing emergency decrees, Feng installed Huang Fu as the new Chinese president.
- Voters in the Canadian province of Ontario rejected a proposal to end the prohibition of sales of liquor. By a margin of 51.5% to 48.5%, chose to continue the Ontario Temperance Act.
- Born: Arthur Brittenden, British newspaper editor who built the London tabloid The Sun into the nation's bestselling newspaper; in Leeds (d. 2015)

== October 24, 1924 (Friday) ==
- Irish independence activist Éamon de Valera was arrested in Newry as he arrived at a meeting of the Sinn Féin party. He was charged with entering a prohibited area under the Civil Powers Act.
- Corneliu Codreanu, leader of Romania's fascist Iron Guard organization, assassinated Constantin Manciu, the police chief of the city of Iași, and shot several other policemen. Codreanu would be acquitted on the grounds that he had acted in self-defense, despite invading the meeting and shooting Manciu from behind.
- The British Foreign Office released the Zinoviev letter, allegedly a directive from Moscow addressed to the Communist Party of Great Britain to increase labor unrest in the UK, and lodged a protest with the Soviet embassy.
- Belgium signed the Geneva Protocol.
- Crown Princes Wilhem of Germany and Rupprecht of Bavaria reconciled after a six-year feud.
- The Prince of Wales ended his visit to the United States and Canada.
- Born: Mary Lee (stage name for Mary Lee Wooters), American singer and film actress for Republic Pictures, often in Westerns with Gene Autry; in Centralia, Illinois (d. 1996)

== October 25, 1924 (Saturday) ==
- The Zinoviev letter, a forgery received by the British Foreign Secretary and leaked by the British intelligence agency MI6, was published on the front page of the Daily Mail tabloid in London, four days before the general election, and would become a major influence in the defeat of the Labour and Liberal parties in October 29 voting. The Daily Mail article commented that "The 'very secret' letter of instruction from Moscow discloses a great Bolshevist plot to paralyse the British Army and Navy and to plunge the country into civil war. The letter is addressed by the Bolshevists in Moscow to the Soviet Government's servants in Great Britain, the Communist Party, who in turn are the masters of Mr. Ramsay MacDonald's Government, which has signed a treaty with Moscow whereby the Soviet is to be guaranteed a 'loan' of millions of British money," and added, "A Copy of the document came into possession of 'The Daily Mail' and we felt it our duty to make it public, and we printed and sent copies to other London morning newspapers yesterday afternoon." The letter became the leading story in every British newspaper. Prime Minister Ramsay MacDonald sent out instructions to all Labour Party candidates to drop their support for the Anglo-Soviet trade agreement, and the Communist Party of Great Britain issued a statement in which it denied ever receiving the letter and declared it a forgery, but the damage done by the letter returned the Conservative Party to power.
- The world's leading air conditioner brand, Daikin Industries, was founded in Osaka, Japan (as name of predecessors for Osaka Metal Industry).
- Indian nationalist Subhas Chandra Bose was arrested on trumped-up charges of plotting to overthrow the government.
- "Trunko", a cryptozoological unknown sea creature (a "cryptid"), was reportedly sighted at Margate, South Africa. Based on photographs of its globster it is now believed to have been a whale carcass. The Daily Mail of London would break the story on December 27, 1924, with the headline "Fish Like A Polar Bear".

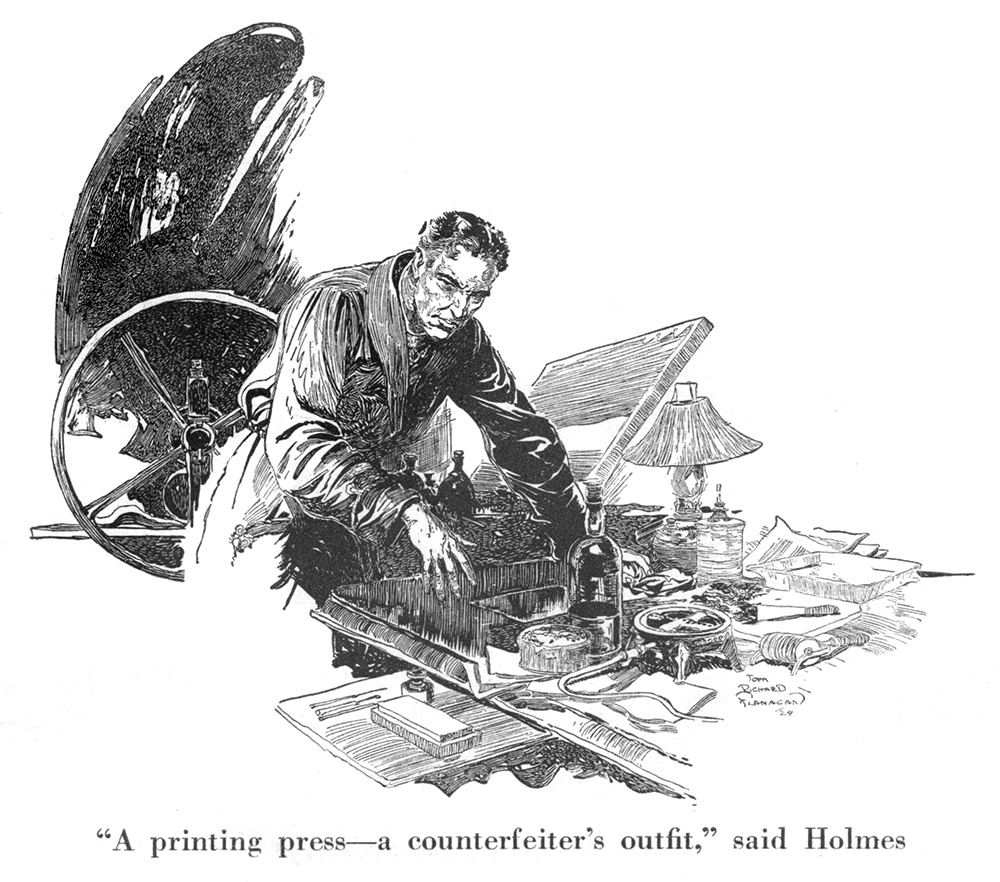
Sherlock Holmes makes a discovery in "The Adventure of the Three Garridebs"

- The Sherlock Holmes short story "The Adventure of the Three Garridebs" by Sir Arthur Conan Doyle was published for the first time in Collier's Weekly in the United States.
- The Ostrobothnians, a Finnish language opera by Leevi Madetoja, was given its first performance, premiering at the Finnish National Opera House.
- Born: Billy Barty (stage name for William Bertanzetti), diminutive (3 feet 9 inches (1.14 m)) American film and TV actor, founder of the Little People of America organization; in Millsboro, Pennsylvania (d. 2000)
- Died: Henry Cantwell Wallace, 58, United States Secretary of Agriculture since 1921, died of sepsis from back surgery.

== October 26, 1924 (Sunday) ==
- Poor ventilation in a chemical processing plant caused a mass accident in Elizabeth, New Jersey that injured 40 employees of the Bayway Refinery of the Standard Oil Company of New Jersey, where leaded gasoline (called "ethyl" by the Standard Oil dealers) was produced using the additive tetraethyllead (TEL). Ernest Oelgart became the first fatality after becoming paranoid following inhalation of fumes, and died later in the day. By the end of the week, 10 more workers were dead at Standard Oil plants.
- The Soviet Union denied the authenticity of the Zinoviev letter (which purported to be a directive to British Communists to overthrow the government) and demanded an apology from Britain.

== October 27, 1924 (Monday) ==
Turkestan ASSR

Bukharan Soviet Republic

Korhezm Soviet Republic

- In a reorganization of the Soviet Union's central Asian republics, the Turkestan Autonomous Soviet Socialist Republic, the Bukharan People's Soviet Republic, and the Khorezm People's Soviet Republic, were broken up along ethnic lines to create the Uzbek SSR and four other autonomous republics that would eventually become the independent nations of Uzbekistan, Turkmenistan, Tajikistan, Kyrgyzstan and Kazakhstan.
- Two days before elections for the House of Commons, Prime Minister Ramsay MacDonald said he believed the Zinoviev letter was authentic and denied that the British government had delayed its publication.
- Died:
  - Percy Haughton, 48, American college football coach for Columbia University since 1923, and previously for Harvard University (1908–1916), died of acute indigestion after becoming ill while on the Columbia football field. His death came two days after Columbia's 27 to 3 win over Williams College. Coach Haughton, who had guided Harvard to four unbeaten football seasons, would later be inducted into the College Football Hall of Fame.
  - Clifford Holland, 41, American civil engineer who oversaw the construction of numerous subway and automobile tunnels in New York City, died of a heart attack one day before the scheduled ceremony to connect the two sides of the Hudson River Vehicular Tunnel and Canal Street Tunnel between New Jersey and New York. The underwater corridor was renamed the Holland Tunnel in his honor on November 12.
  - Abraham Ángel (Abraham Ángel Card), 19, Mexican painter, was found dead of a cocaine overdose.
  - Albert Henry Loeb, 56, Chicago attorney, business executive and father of Richard Loeb of the Leopold and Loeb murder duo, died of a heart attack two months after his son's conviction and life sentence.

== October 28, 1924 (Tuesday) ==
- France and the Soviet Union established diplomatic relations for the first time since the Communist government had replaced the Russian Empire in 1917. Leonid Krasin would become the Soviet Ambassador to France on November 14, and Jean Herbette became France's envoy to Moscow.
- Many prominent Spaniards opposed to the dictatorship of Miguel Primo de Rivera were arrested at a meeting in Madrid. The writer Pedro Sainz was among those imprisoned. General Dámaso Berenguer was present but not arrested at the time.
- The British African protectorate of Sierra Leone held its first elections for the native population. Voters were allowed to select three of the 22 members of the new Legislative Council of Sierra Leone. The right to vote was limited to literate Africans who were at least 21 years old and had at least 10 pounds sterling of property. Out of 25,000 people, only 1,866 registered. Ernest Beoku-Betts, Herbert Bankole-Bright and Albert Tuboku-Metzger were elected. The other 19 Assembly members were made up of five appointed Africans and 14 British government officials.
- Born:
  - Christine Glanville, American Briton English puppeteer; in Halifax, West Yorkshire (d. 1999)
  - Gil Boyne (Mark Thomas Gilboyne), American hypnotherapist; in Philadelphia (d. 2010)
- Died: Édouard de Max (stage name for Eduard-Alexandru Max Romalo), 55, Romanian-born French stage actor, died after a long illness one month after his final performance.

== October 29, 1924 (Wednesday) ==
- Voting took place in the UK for all 615 seats of the House of Commons and was marked by a gain of 154 seats by the Conservative Party of former Prime Minister Stanley Baldwin, as well as a loss of 158 seats for the coalition of Prime Minister Ramsay MacDonald's Labour Party and former Prime Minister H. H. Asquith's Liberal Party. With 308 seats needed for a majority, the Labour-Liberal coalition had a 349 to 258 control of Commons over the Conservatives. Baldwin's Tories had a 412 to 198 seat control after the voting.
- Born: Danielle Gouze Mitterrand, Première dame de France from 1981 to 1995 as the wife of President François Mitterrand; in Verdun, Meuse département (d. 2011)
- Died:
  - Frances Hodgson Burnett, 74, Anglo-American novelist known for Little Lord Fauntleroy and for The Secret Garden
  - John Marden, 69, Australian headmaster and pioneer of women's education

== October 30, 1924 (Thursday) ==
- Eight deputies of the Irish Free State's parliament, the Dáil Éireann— Francis Cahill, Thomas Carter, Henry Finlay, Seán Gibbons, Alexander McCabe, Daniel McCarthy, Seán McGarry and Seán Milroy— resigned after the government response in the Irish Army Mutiny.
- Seven days after overthrowing China's President Cao Kun in the Beijing Coup, Chinese warlord Feng Yuxiang broke with the Zhili clique and allied his forces with the Fengtian clique led by Zhang Zuolin, inviting Zhang to form a new, pro-Japanese, government.
- Chemical engineer Thomas Midgley Jr. of the Standard Oil Company of New Jersey (later Exxon) participated in a press conference to demonstrate the apparent safety of the gasoline additive tetraethyllead (TEL). Midgley poured the TEL over his hands, placed a bottle of it under his nose, and inhaled its vapor for 60 seconds, declaring that he could do this every day without succumbing to any problems. Despite the demonstration, the U.S. state of New Jersey closed the Bayway Refinery, where five workers had died and 35 others were seriously injured from lead poisoning by TEL fumes.
- Henry Ford endorsed Calvin Coolidge for re-election, calling him "short on promises and long on action."
- Died: Stina Quint, 65, Swedish publisher and founder of the children's magazine Kamratposten

== October 31, 1924 (Friday) ==
- The government of Miguel Primo de Rivera had Spain's highest general, Dámaso Berenguer, sentenced to six months' imprisonment for insubordination. All others present at the meeting of October 28 were condemned to solitary confinement for an indefinite period without trial.
- The Japan Swimming Federation was founded.
- The Ukraine sports club Dynamo was founded.
