= General Act for the Pacific Settlement of International Disputes =

1928 multilateral convention

The General Act for the Pacific Settlement of International Disputes is a multilateral convention concluded in Geneva on September 26, 1928. It went into effect on August 16, 1929, and was registered in League of Nations Treaty Series on the same day. The treaty was ultimately ratified by 22 states. It was subsequently denounced by Spain.

== Terms of the act ==
The act provided frameworks for resolving international disputes by means of either establishing a conciliation commission (articles 1–16), establishing an arbitration tribunal (art. 21–28), or deferring failed disputes to the Permanent Court of International Justice (art. 17–20), thus combining three different 'model convention' proposals from the League's Commission of Arbitration and Security - set up by the League's Preparation Commission in 1927 - into one unified act.

The General Act reflected divisions within the League over how to achieve the collective security envisioned by Articles 11 and 16 of the League of Nations Covenant, e.g. Fridtjof Nansen championed the use of compulsory arbitration, while the United Kingdom refused the idea of compulsory deferment of even a limited range of disputes to the Permanent Court.

The result was a treaty which did not contain the automatic mechanisms of the failed 1924 Geneva Protocol, and which was considered an unambitious substitute in comparison.

Finland produced an additional suggestion that nations should provide financial assistance to attacked nations, while Germany suggested that nations pledge themselves to adopting any resolution by the League Council, that the Council considered would reduce the risk of war. The Finnish and German proposals - although supported unanimously in the League's Assembly - were not incorporated into the General Act but deferred for later consideration by the League Council.

== Further developments ==
Following the Second World War, the United Nations sought to replace the 1928 document with a more up to date one. As a result, it was replaced in 1949 by a revised act drafted by the United Nations Organization and then by the Manila Declaration on the Peaceful Settlement of International Disputes. It also served as the basis for the European Convention for the Peaceful Settlement of Disputes, concluded in 1957.

== See also ==
- Geneva Protocol (1924)
- Kellogg–Briand Pact
- American Treaty on Pacific Settlement
