= History of the Boston Bruins =

NHL team history

The history of the Boston Bruins professional ice hockey team dates back to 1924, making them the third-oldest active team in the National Hockey League (NHL), and the oldest surviving professional hockey franchise in the United States.

The Bruins are one of the Original Six NHL teams, along with the Detroit Red Wings, Chicago Blackhawks, Montreal Canadiens, New York Rangers and Toronto Maple Leafs. They have won six Stanley Cup championships, tied for fourth-most of any team with the Blackhawks (trailing the Canadiens, Maple Leafs, and Red Wings, with 24, 13, and 11, respectively), and tied for second-most for an NHL team based in the United States. The Bruins have also won four Presidents' Trophies, their win in 2023 featuring the Bruins with 135 points—the most in one season in NHL history.

The first facility to host the Bruins was the Boston Arena (now known as Matthews Arena), the world's oldest (built 1909–10) indoor ice hockey facility still in use for the sport at any level of competition. Following the Bruins' departure from Boston Arena, the team played its home games at the Boston Garden for 67 seasons, beginning in 1928 and concluding in 1995, when they moved to the TD Garden, their current home.

== Early years (1924–1942) ==
In 1924, as a result of the convincing of Boston grocery magnate Charles Adams, the NHL decided to expand to the United States. Adams had come to greatly enjoy ice hockey while watching the 1924 Stanley Cup Final between the NHL champion Montreal Canadiens and the Western Canada Hockey League (WCHL) champion Calgary Tigers. The previous year in 1923, sports promoter Thomas Duggan received options on three NHL franchises for the United States, and sold one of the options to Adams (Duggan would go on to found the New York Americans with another of the franchises), who in turn, persuaded the NHL to grant him a franchise for the city of Boston for $15,000, which occurred on October 13, 1924. With the Montreal Maroons, the team was one of the NHL's first expansion teams, and the first to be based in the United States. Adams' first act was to hire Art Ross, a former star player and innovator, as general manager. Ross was the face of the franchise for the next thirty years, including four separate stints as coach.

Adams directed Ross to come up with a nickname that would portray an untamed animal displaying speed, agility and cunning. Ross came up with "Bruins", a name for brown bears used in classic folk tales. The nickname also went along with the team's original uniform colors of brown and yellow, which were taken from Adams' grocery chain, First National Stores.

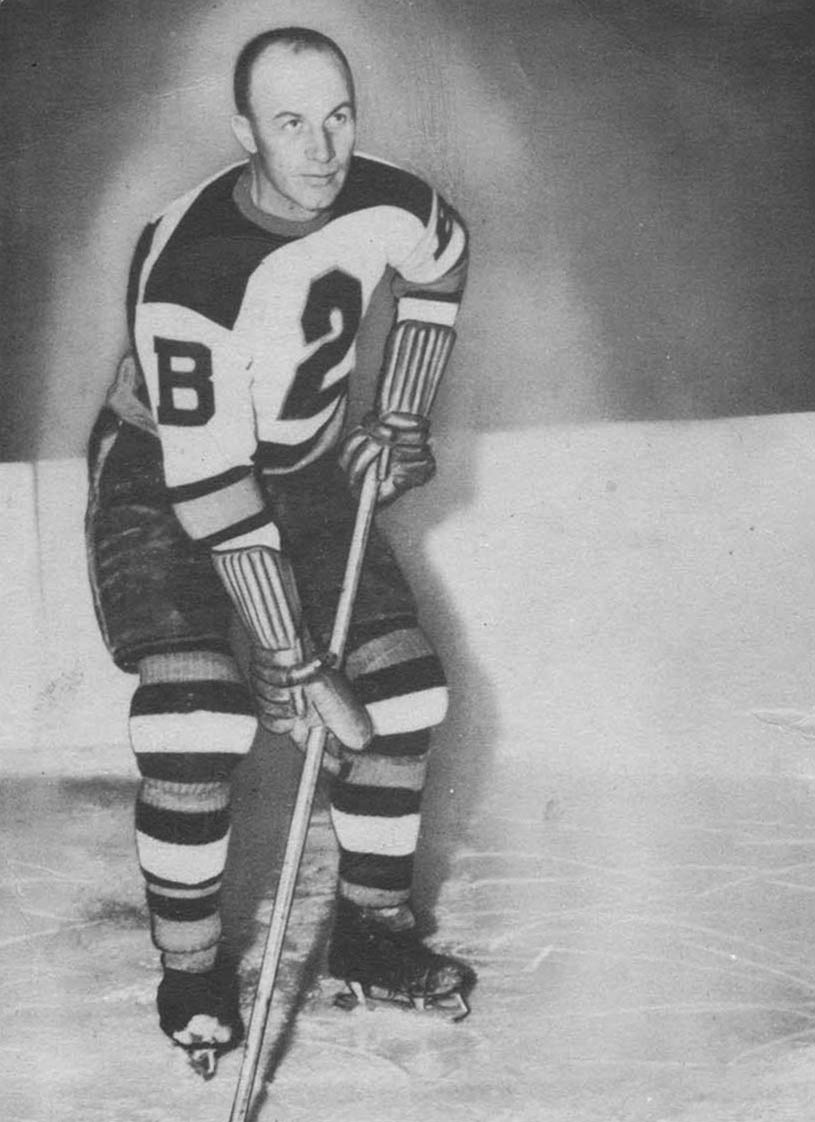
Eddie Shore as a member of the Boston Bruins.

On December 1, 1924, the Bruins played their first NHL game, and the first NHL game played in the United States, against their expansion cousins the Maroons, at Boston Arena, with forward Smokey Harris scoring the first-ever Bruins goal, spurring the Bruins to a 2–1 win. This would be one of the few high points of the season, as the Bruins proved to be no match for the established NHL teams. The Bruins only managed a 6–24–0 record (to this day, their worst points percentage – .200 – in franchise history) and finished in last place. Within this timeframe, only one week later on December 8, 1924, what would become one of the NHL's all-time fiercest rivalries was initiated, as the Montreal Canadiens were the visiting team at the Boston Arena that night, defeating the hometown Bruins by a 4–3 score. The Bruins played three more seasons at the Arena, after which they became the main tenant of the newly built Boston Garden, while the old Boston Arena facility – the world's oldest existing indoor ice hockey venue still used for the sport at any level of competition, and the only surviving rink where an Original Six NHL team began their career in the league – was eventually taken over by Northeastern University, and renamed Matthews Arena when the university renovated it in 1979.

The Bruins managed to improve in their second season to a winning 17–15–4 record, but missed out on the third and final playoff berth by one point to the expansion Pittsburgh Pirates. The improvement to a winning record which originally held the record for the biggest single-season improvement in NHL history, and is now third.

In their third season, 1926–27, Ross took advantage of the collapse of the Western Hockey League to purchase several western stars, including the team's first great star, defenseman Eddie Shore. With the Bruins, he would go on to become one of the greatest players in NHL history. The Bruins' moves were largely counterbalanced by WHL player acquisitions by other NHL teams, and the team's record was actually slightly worse than the previous season, but Boston nevertheless qualified for the then-expanded playoffs by a comfortable margin. In their first-ever playoff run, the Bruins reached the Stanley Cup Final where they lost to the Ottawa Senators in the first Cup Final to be exclusively between NHL teams. The cup-winning game for the Senators would see Bruin Billy Coutu attack the referee, earning him a ban from the NHL for life, the only in league history.

The 1928–29 season was the first played at Boston Garden, which Adams had built after guaranteeing his backers $500,000 in gate receipts over the next five years. In 1929, the Bruins defeated the New York Rangers to win their first Stanley Cup. Standout players on the first championship team included Shore, Harry Oliver, Dit Clapper, Dutch Gainor and goaltender Tiny Thompson.

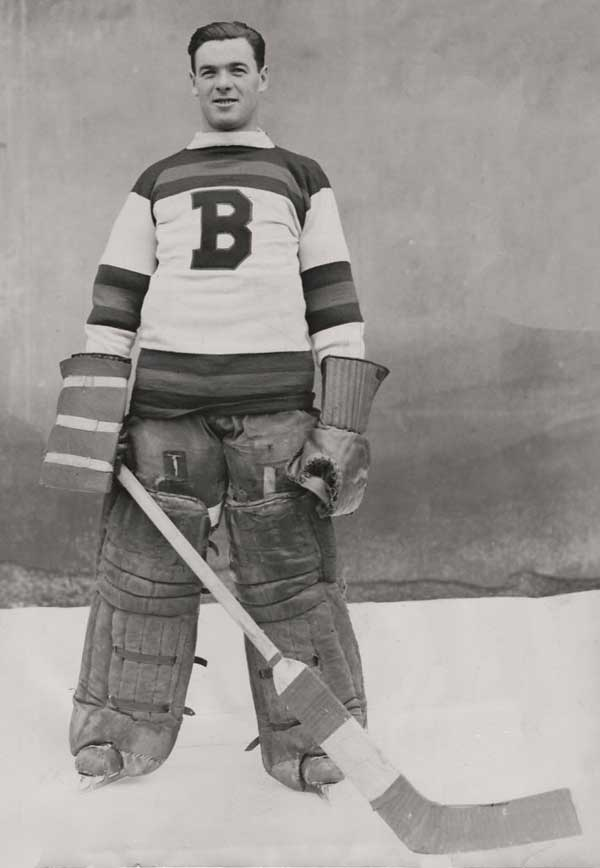
Tiny Thompson was the goaltender for the Bruins from 1928 to 1938. He helped the team achieve its first Stanley Cup victory in 1929.

The season after that, 1929–30, the Bruins posted the best-ever regular-season winning percentage in the NHL (.875, winning 38 of 44 games, a record which still stands) and shattered numerous team scoring records, but lost to the Montreal Canadiens in the Stanley Cup Final.

The 1930s Bruins teams included Shore, Thompson, Clapper, Babe Siebert and Cooney Weiland. The team led the league's standings five times in the decade. In 1939, the team captured its second Stanley Cup. That year, Thompson was traded for rookie goaltender Frank Brimsek. Brimsek had an award-winning season, capturing the Vezina and Calder Trophies, becoming the first rookie named to the NHL first All-Star team, and earning the nickname "Mr. Zero." The team skating in front of Brimsek included Bill Cowley, Shore, Clapper and "Sudden Death" Mel Hill (who scored three overtime goals in one playoff series), together with the "Kraut line" of center Milt Schmidt, right winger Bobby Bauer and left winger Woody Dumart.

In 1940, Shore was traded to the struggling New York Americans for his final NHL season. In 1941, the Bruins won their third Stanley Cup after achieving an 27–8–13 record and finishing first in the regular season. It was their last Stanley Cup for 29 years. World War II affected the Bruins more than most teams; Brimsek and the "Krauts" all enlisted in the Royal Canadian Air Force following the 1941 Cup victory, and lost the most productive years of their careers at war. Cowley, assisted by veteran player Clapper and Busher Jackson, became the team's remaining star.

== Original Six era (1942–1967) ==
By 1942, the NHL had been reduced to the six teams that would be called the "Original Six", but on-ice talent was still depleted due to World War II.

In 1944, Bruin Herb Cain set the then-NHL record for points in a season with 82, more than double his previous career high. However, the Bruins did not make the playoffs that season, and while the next season, Cain was second in the league in goals with 32, the 1945–46 season—when demobilized soldiers began to return to the league—was his last, as he was unable to secure deals with any teams.

That same year, Dit Clapper led the team back to the Stanley Cup Final as player-coach. He retired as a player after the next season, becoming the first player to play twenty NHL seasons, but stayed on as coach. The next three seasons saw the Bruins make the playoffs each year—with two third place and one second-place finishes, respectively—but lose in the first round of the playoffs each time. One shocking development was the lifetime suspension of star young forward Don Gallinger in 1948 on suspicion of gambling on his own team to lose.

Several changes took place after the third such defeat in the 1948-49 season. While the returning Kraut Line of Schmidt, Dumart and Bauer continued their previous strong level of play post-war (in their first full year back, Schmidt was voted First Team All-Star at center, while Dumart and Bauer were both voted Second Team All-Stars), Brimsek did not, and was traded to the Chicago Black Hawks. Clapper stepped down as coach. The only remaining quality young player who stayed with the team for any length was forward Johnny Peirson, recognizable to fans of a later era as the Bruins' television color commentator in the 1970s.

During the 1948–49 season, the original form of the "spoked-B" logo, with a small number "24" to the left of the capital B signifying the calendar year in the 20th century in which the Bruins team first played, and a similarly small "49" to the right of the "B", for the then-current season's calendar year in the 20th century, appeared on their home uniforms—a nod to the Boston area's nickname of "The Hub". The following season, the logo was modified into the basic "spoked-B" form that was to be used, virtually unchanged (except for certain proportions within the logo), through the 1993–94 season.

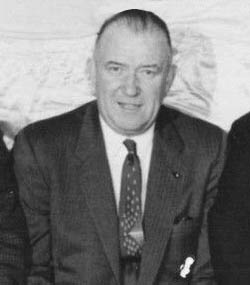
In 1951, Walter A. Brown purchased the Boston Bruins from Weston Adams.

The 1950s began with Charles Adams' son Weston (who had been team president since 1936) facing financial trouble. He was forced to accept a buyout offer from Walter A. Brown, the owner of the National Basketball Association's Boston Celtics and the Garden, in 1951. Although there were some instances of success (such as making the Stanley Cup Final in 1953, 1957, and 1958, only to lose to the Montreal Canadiens each time), the Bruins mustered only four winning seasons between 1947 and 1967. They missed the playoffs eight straight years between 1960 and 1967.

In 1954, on New Year's Day, Robert Skrak, an assistant to Frank Zamboni, the inventor of the best-known ice resurfacing machine of the time, demonstrated a very early model of the machine at Boston Garden to the team management, and as a result, the Bruins ordered one of the then-produced "Model E" resurfacers to be used at the Garden, the first known NHL team to acquire one of the soon-to-be-ubiquitous "Zambonis" for their own use. The Bruins' Zamboni Model E, factory serial number 21—used as late as the 1980s on an emergency basis—eventually ended up in the Hockey Hall of Fame in Toronto in 1988 for preservation.

On January 18, 1958, a milestone in NHL history occurred as the first black person ever to play in the NHL stepped onto the ice for the Bruins, New Brunswick-born left wing Willie O'Ree. He played in 45 games for the Bruins over the 1957–58 and 1960–61 seasons, scoring six goals and ten assists in his NHL career.

During this period, the farm system of the Bruins was not as expansive or well-developed as most of the other five teams. The Bruins sought players not protected by the other teams, and in like fashion to the aforementioned signing of Willie O'Ree, the team signed Tommy Williams from the 1960 Olympic-gold medal-winning American national men's hockey team—at the time the only American player in the NHL—in 1962. The "Uke Line"—named for the Ukrainian heritage of Johnny Bucyk, Vic Stasiuk, and Bronco Horvath – came to Boston in 1957 and enjoyed four productive offensive seasons, heralding, along with scoring stalwarts Don McKenney and Fleming MacKell, the successful era of the late 1950s. There followed a long and difficult reconstruction period in the early to mid-1960s.

== Expansion and the Big Bad Bruins (1967–1979) ==
Weston Adams repurchased the Bruins in 1964 after Brown's death and set about rebuilding the team. Adams signed a defenseman from Parry Sound, Ontario, named Bobby Orr, who entered the league in 1966 and became, in the eyes of many, the greatest player of all time. He was announced that season's winner of the Calder Memorial Trophy for Rookie of the Year and named to the second NHL All-Star team. When asked about Orr's NHL debut game, October 19, 1966, against the Detroit Red Wings, then-Bruins coach Harry Sinden recalled:

"Our fans had heard about this kid for a few years now. There was a lot of pressure on him, but he met all the expectations. He was a star from the moment they played the national anthem in the opening game of the season."

Despite Orr's stellar rookie season, the Bruins would miss the playoffs. The next season, they would go on to make the playoffs for the first of 29 straight seasons, an all-time record. The Bruins then obtained young forwards Phil Esposito, Ken Hodge and Fred Stanfield from Chicago in a deal celebrated as one of the most one-sided in hockey history. Hodge and Stanfield became key elements of the Bruins' success, and Esposito, who centered a line with Hodge and Wayne Cashman, became the league's top goal scorer and the first NHL player to break the 100-point mark, setting many goal- and point-scoring records. Esposito remains one of four players to win the Art Ross Trophy four consecutive seasons (the other three are Jaromir Jagr, Wayne Gretzky and Gordie Howe). With other stars like forwards Bucyk, John McKenzie, Derek Sanderson, and Hodge, steady defenders like Dallas Smith and goaltender Gerry Cheevers, the "Big Bad Bruins" became one of the league's top teams from the late 1960s into the 1980s.

In 1970, a 29-year Stanley Cup drought came to an end in Boston, as the Bruins defeated the St. Louis Blues in four games in the Final. Orr scored the game-winning goal in overtime to clinch the Stanley Cup. The same season was Orr's most awarded—the third of eight consecutive years he won the James Norris Memorial Trophy as the top defenseman in the NHL—and he won the Art Ross Trophy, the Conn Smythe Trophy and the Hart Memorial Trophy, the only player to ever win four major awards in the same season.

"No one, absolutely no one, could have finished a goal in like manner. For years Orr had been described as someone who was graceful, elegant, powerful, without fear—poetry in motion. All these epithets were captured and immortalized in the photos of the goal that won the 1970 Stanley Cup."

The 1970–71 season was, in retrospect, the high-water mark of the 1970s for Boston. While Sinden temporarily retired from hockey to enter business (he was replaced by ex-Bruin and Canadien defenseman Tom Johnson), the Bruins set dozens of offensive scoring records: they had seven of the league's top ten scorers—a feat not achieved before or since—set the record for wins in a season, and in a league that had never seen a 100-point scorer before 1969, the Bruins had four that year. All four (Orr, Esposito, Bucyk and Hodge) were named first team All-Stars, a feat matched in the expansion era only by the 1976–77 Canadiens. Boston were favored to repeat as Cup champions but ran into a roadblock in the playoffs. Up 5–1 at one point in game two of the quarter-finals against the Canadiens (and rookie goaltender Ken Dryden), the Bruins squandered the lead to lose 7–5. The Bruins never recovered and lost the series in seven games.

While the Bruins were not quite as dominant the next season (although only three points behind the 1971 pace), Esposito and Orr were once again one-two in the scoring standings (followed by Bucyk in ninth place) and they regained the Stanley Cup by defeating the New York Rangers in six games in the Final. Rangers blueliner Brad Park, who came runner-up to Orr's (then) five-year monopoly on the Norris Trophy, said, "Bobby Orr was—didn't make—the difference."

The 1972–73 season saw upheaval for the Bruins. Former head coach Sinden became the general manager. Bruins players Gerry Cheevers, Derek Sanderson and Johnny McKenzie left to join the upstart World Hockey Association. Coach Tom Johnson was fired 52 games into the season, replaced by Bep Guidolin, who had been Orr's coach with the OHA junior Oshawa Generals. The Adams family, which had owned the team since its founding in the 1920s, sold it to Storer Broadcasting. The Bruins' season came to a premature end in a first-round loss to the Rangers in the 1973 playoffs, losing Esposito to injury in that first round. In 1974, the Bruins regained their first-place standing in the regular season, with three 100-point scorers on the team (Esposito, Orr, and Hodge). However, they lost the 1974 Final in an upset to the Philadelphia Flyers.

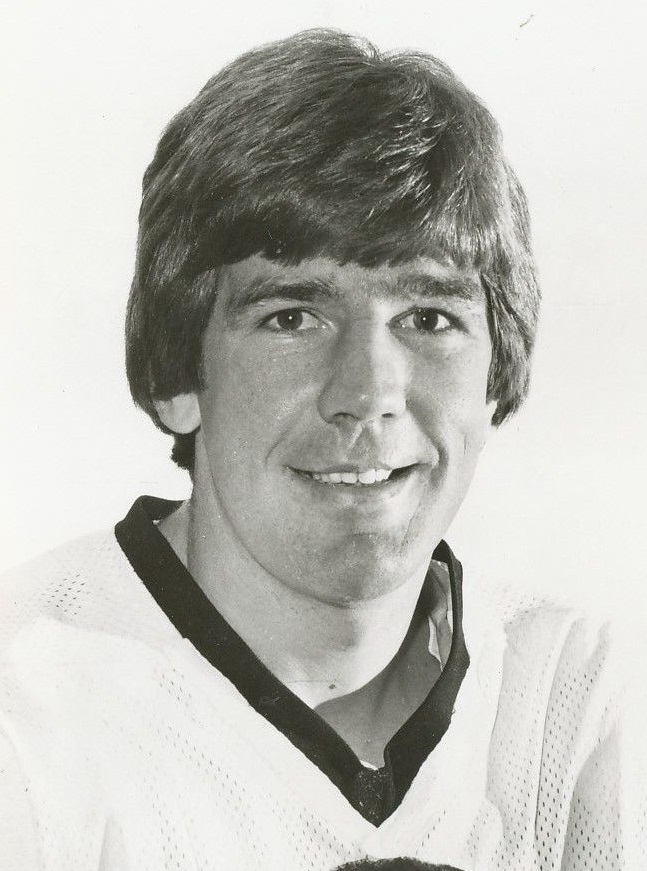
Terry O'Reilly was drafted by the Bruins 14th overall in the 1971 draft. He played his entire career with the Bruins from 1971 to 1985.

Don Cherry stepped behind the bench as the new coach in 1974–75. The Bruins stocked themselves with enforcers and grinders, and remained competitive under Cherry's reign, the so-called "Lunch Pail A.C"., behind players such as Gregg Sheppard, Terry O'Reilly, Stan Jonathan, and Peter McNab. This would also turn out to be Orr's final full season in the league, before his knee injuries worsened, as well as the last time Orr and Esposito would finish 1–2 in regular season scoring. The Bruins placed second in the Adams Division, and lost to the Chicago Black Hawks in the first round of the 1975 playoffs, losing a best-of-three series, two games to one.

Continuing with Cherry's rebuilding of the team, the Bruins traded Esposito and Carol Vadnais for Brad Park, Jean Ratelle and Joe Zanussi to the Rangers. That trade was particularly controversial for both Bruins and Rangers fans, as Esposito was one of the most popular Bruins players (though it was known he disagreed with Cherry's coaching), while Park and Ratelle were Rangers stalwarts. However, Boston ended up getting the better of the trade, as Esposito never reached his previous scoring highs with the Rangers, while Ratelle maintained his skill level with the Bruins and was a high scorer for several years more. Particularly, it was Park who reemerged as one of the league's best defensemen and filled the void left by Orr, who had been sidelined by surgery at the start of 1975–76 and only managed to play ten games before being injured and lost for the rest of the season. The Bruins made the semi-finals again, losing to the Flyers.

As an impending free agent, contract talks with Orr and his agent Alan Eagleson had been tumultuous throughout 1975–76. Although insurers would not underwrite Orr and doctors advised he could not play much longer, the Bruins still attempted to re-sign Orr and offered him a five-year deal at US$925,000, or 18.6 percent ownership of the club in 1980. However, Eagleson turned down the offer without informing Orr, instead signing him to the Chicago Black Hawks in 1976; Orr was never effective – having only played 26 games in Chicago – and retired after many knee operations in 1979.

Cheevers returned from the WHA in 1976-77, and the Bruins got past the Flyers in the semi-finals, but they were swept by the Canadiens in the Stanley Cup Final. The story repeated itself in 1977-78—with a balanced attack that saw Boston have eleven players with 20+ goal seasons, still the NHL record—as the Bruins made the Final once more, but lost in six games to the Canadiens team that had recorded the best regular season in modern history. After that series, Johnny Bucyk retired, holding virtually every Bruins' career longevity and scoring mark to that time.

The 1979 semi-final series against the Habs proved to be Cherry's undoing. In the deciding seventh game, the Bruins, up by a goal, were called for having too many men on the ice in the late stages of the third period. Montreal tied the game on the ensuing power play and won in overtime. Never popular with Harry Sinden, by then the Bruins' general manager, Cherry was dismissed as head coach but was later hired in the same capacity with the Colorado Rockies.

At Madison Square Garden on December 23, 1979, just after the Bruins beat the New York Rangers 4–3, John Kaptain, a Rangers fan from New Jersey, stole Stan Jonathan's stick and hit him with it during a post-game scrum. When other fans got involved, Terry O'Reilly charged into the stands followed by his teammates. During the fight, Bruin defenseman and future NBC hockey analyst Mike Milbury famously pulled off Kaptain's shoe and hit him with it. O'Reilly, a future team captain, received an eight-game suspension for the brawl, while Milbury and McNab were suspended for six games and the entire team save for Cheevers was fined $500, while Kaptain was sentenced to six months in prison. In 2012, TSN named the fight, entitled "Milbury and The Shoe", as No. 4 on its Top 10 Craziest Hockey Moments.

== Ray Bourque era (1979–2000) ==
The 1979 season saw new head coach Fred Creighton—himself replaced by the newly retired Cheevers the following year. The Bruins trade of Ron Grahame to the Los Angeles Kings for a first-round pick, that turned out to be eighth overall, enabled the Bruins to draft Ray Bourque, one of the greatest defensemen of all-time and the face of the Bruins for over two decades. The Bruins made the playoffs every year through the 1980s behind stars such as Park, Bourque and Rick Middleton—and had the league's best record in 1983 behind a Vezina Trophy–winning season from ex-Flyer goaltender Pete Peeters, with 110 points—but always fell short of making the Final.

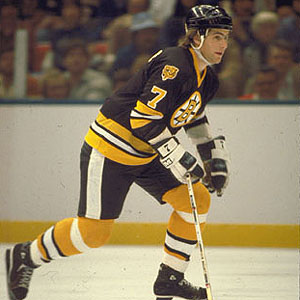
Ray Bourque, shown in 1981 and before switching to his familiar No. 77, led the Bruins to two Stanley Cup Final appearances in 1988 and 1990.

Bourque, Cam Neely and Keith Crowder led the Bruins to another Stanley Cup Final appearance in 1988 against the Edmonton Oilers. The Bruins lost in a four-game sweep, but a memorable moment in the would-be fourth game ensued, when in the second period with the game tied 3–3, a blown fuse put the lights out at the Boston Garden. The rest of the game was cancelled and the series shifted to Edmonton. The Oilers completed the sweep, 6–3, back at Northlands Coliseum in Edmonton in what was originally scheduled as game five. The event is considered to be the reason the Bruins began work on a new arena. Boston returned to the Stanley Cup Final in 1990 (with Neely, Bourque, Craig Janney, Bobby Carpenter, and rookie Don Sweeney, and former Oiler goalie Andy Moog and Reggie Lemelin splitting goaltending duties), but again lost to the Oilers, this time in five games.

In the 1987–88 NHL season – when the Bruins finally broke the Canadiens' 57-year-long (1930–87) playoff win streak against them – through the 1990, 1990-91, 1991-92 and 1994 seasons, the Bruins began to amass a playoff series winning streak of their own, in defeating their Original Six nemesis Montreal Canadiens in the playoffs, getting some revenge for a rivalry which had been lopsided in the Canadiens' favor in playoff action, with Montreal having won 18 consecutive playoff series against the Bruins between 1946 and 1987. In 1990–91 and 1991–92, the Bruins suffered two consecutive Conference Final losses to the eventual Cup champion, the Mario Lemieux-led Pittsburgh Penguins. Starting from the 1992–93 NHL season onwards, the Bruins had not gotten past the second round of the playoffs until winning the Stanley Cup after the 2011 season.

The 1992–93 season ended disappointingly for several reasons. Despite finishing with the second-best regular-season record after Pittsburgh, Boston was swept in the first round by the Buffalo Sabres. During the post-season awards ceremony, Bruin players finished as runner-up on many of the honors—Bourque for the Norris, Oates for the Art Ross and Lady Byng Trophy, Joe Juneau (who had broken the NHL record for assists in a season by a left-winger, a mark he still holds) for the Calder Trophy, Dave Poulin for the Frank J. Selke Trophy, Moog for the William M. Jennings Trophy and coach Brian Sutter for the Jack Adams Award. Poulin did win the King Clancy Memorial Trophy, while Bourque made the NHL All-Star first team and Juneau the NHL All-Rookie team.

The 1994-95 season would be the Bruins' last at the Boston Garden. The final official match played in the Garden was a 3–0 loss to the New Jersey Devils in the 1995 playoffs; the Bruins went on to play the final game at the old arena on September 28, 1995, in an exhibition matchup against the Canadiens. They subsequently moved into the FleetCenter, now known as the TD Garden. In the 1996 playoffs, the Bruins lost their first-round series to the Florida Panthers in five games.

In 1996-97, Boston missed the playoffs for the first time in 30 years (and for the first time in the expansion era), having set the North American major professional record for most consecutive seasons in the playoffs. The Bruins lost in the first round of the 1998 playoffs to the Washington Capitals in six games. In 1999, the Bruins defeated the Carolina Hurricanes in six games during the first round of the playoffs. Nevertheless, they would lose to the Sabres in six games in the second round of the playoffs. In the 1999–2000 season, general manager Harry Sinden wanted Bourque to have a chance to close out his career with a Stanley Cup win and decided to pursue a trade with the Colorado Avalanche. Bourque and fellow veteran Dave Andreychuk were sent to Colorado in exchange for Brian Rolston, Martin Grenier, Samuel Pahlsson and a first-round draft pick (2000 draft, 27th overall, used to select Martin Samuelsson).

== Struggles in the new millennium (2000–2007) ==
In the 1999–2000 season, the Bruins finished in last place in the Northeast Division and failed to qualify for the playoffs. During a game between the Bruins and the Vancouver Canucks on February 21, 2000, Marty McSorley was ejected for using his stick to hit Canucks forward Donald Brashear in the head. McSorley was initially suspended for the remaining 23 games of the season. However, on October 6, McSorley was convicted of assault using a weapon for his attack on Brashear; he was then sentenced to 18 months of probation. As a result of the conviction, McSorley's suspension was extended through February 21, 2001.

After a 3–4–1 start, the Bruins fired head coach Pat Burns and went with Mike Keenan for the rest of the way. Despite a 15-point improvement from the previous season, the Bruins missed the playoffs in 2000–01 by just one point, and Keenan was let go. Centerman Jason Allison led the Bruins in scoring. The following season, 2001–02, the Bruins improved again with another 13 points, winning their first Northeast Division title since 1992-93 with a core built around Joe Thornton, Sergei Samsonov, Brian Rolston, Bill Guerin, Mike Knuble and the newly acquired Glen Murray. Their regular-season success did not translate to the post-season, however, as they lost in six games to the underdog eighth-place Montreal Canadiens in the first round.

The 2002–03 season found the Bruins platooning their goaltending staff between Steve Shields and John Grahame for most of the season. A mid-season trade brought in veteran Jeff Hackett. In the midst of a late-season slump, general manager Mike O'Connell fired head coach Robbie Ftorek with nine games to go and named himself interim coach. The Bruins managed to finish seventh in the East, but lost to the eventual Stanley Cup champion New Jersey Devils in five games. In 2003–04, the Bruins began the season with ex-Toronto Maple Leaf goalie Felix Potvin. Later in the season, the Bruins put rookie Andrew Raycroft into the starting role. Raycroft eventually won the Calder Trophy that season. The Bruins went on to win another division title and appeared to get past the first round for the first time in five years with a 3–1 series lead on the rival Canadiens. However, the Canadiens rallied back to win three-straight games, upsetting the Bruins.

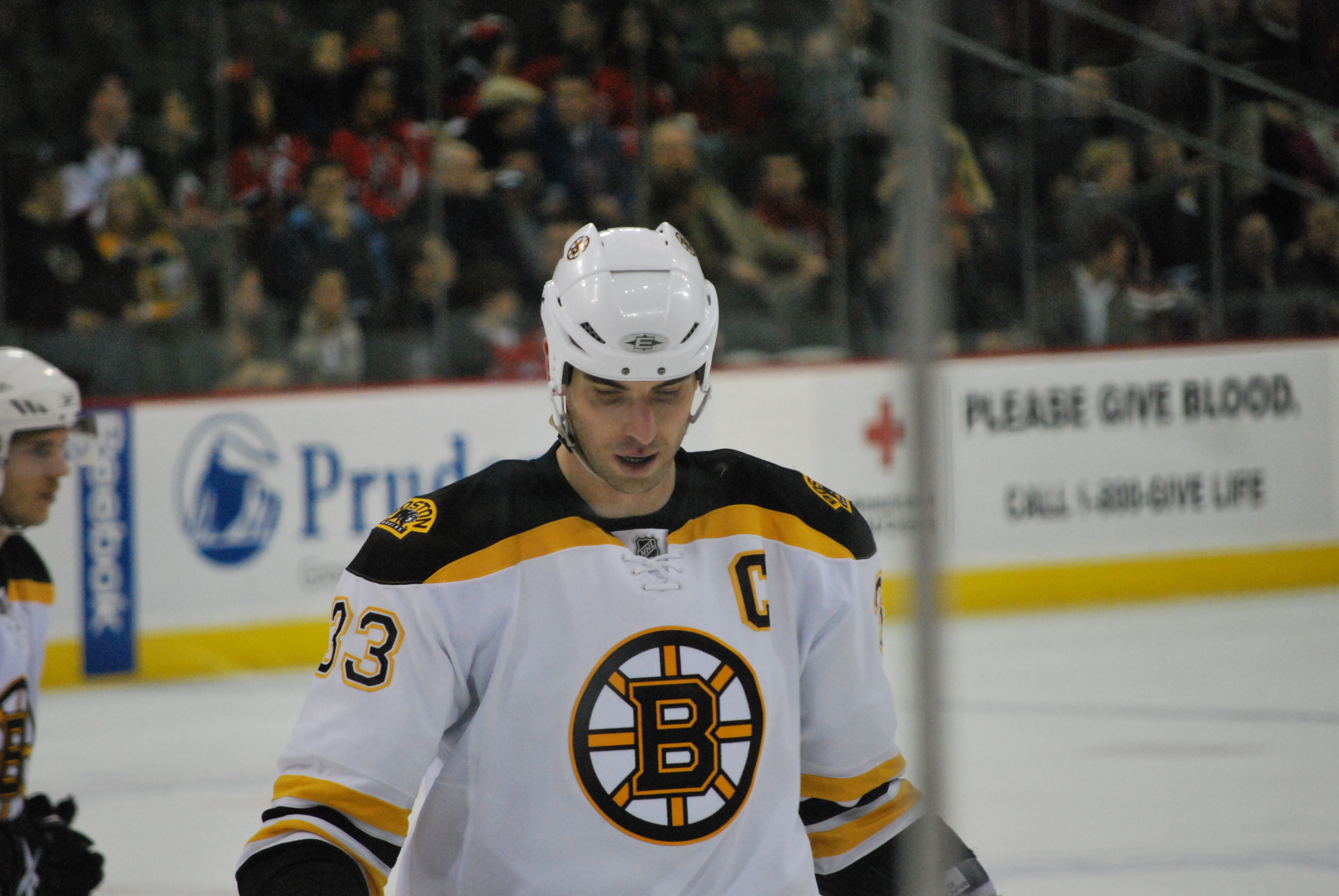
The Bruins acquired Zdeno Chara on July 1, 2006, naming him the new team captain.

The 2004–05 NHL season was wiped out by a lockout, and the Bruins had a lot of space within the new salary cap implemented for 2005–06. Bruins management eschewed younger free agents in favor of older veterans such as Alexei Zhamnov and Brian Leetch. The newcomers were oft-injured, and by the end of November, the Bruins team traded their captain and franchise player, Joe Thornton (who went on to win the Art Ross and Hart Trophies). In exchange, the Bruins received Marco Sturm, Brad Stuart and Wayne Primeau from the San Jose Sharks. After losing 10 of 11 games before the trade, the Bruins came back with a 3–0 victory over the league-leading Ottawa Senators, as rookie goaltender Hannu Toivonen earned his first career NHL shutout. When Toivonen went down with an injury in January, journeyman goalie Tim Thomas started 16-straight games and brought the Bruins back into the playoff run. Two points out of eighth place at the Winter Olympic break, the Bruins fired general manager Mike O'Connell in March and the Bruins missed the playoffs for the first time in five years.

== Peter Chiarelli era (2007–2015) ==
=== Rejuvenation (2007–2009) ===
Peter Chiarelli was hired as the new general manager of the team. Head coach Mike Sullivan was fired and Dave Lewis, former coach of the Detroit Red Wings, was hired to replace him. The Bruins signed Zdeno Chara, one of the most coveted defensemen in the NHL and a former NHL All-Star, from the Ottawa Senators, and Marc Savard, who finished just three points short of a 100-point season in 2005–06 with the Atlanta Thrashers, to long-term deals. The 2006–07 season ended in the team finishing in last place in the division. The Bruins traded Brad Stuart and Wayne Primeau to the Calgary Flames for Andrew Ference and forward Chuck Kobasew.

After the disappointing 2007 season, Lewis was fired as coach, and the Bruins announced on June 21, 2007, that former Canadiens and Devils head coach Claude Julien had been named as the new head coach. The Bruins also unveiled a new logo and a brand new shoulder patch closely based on the main jersey logo used until 1932.

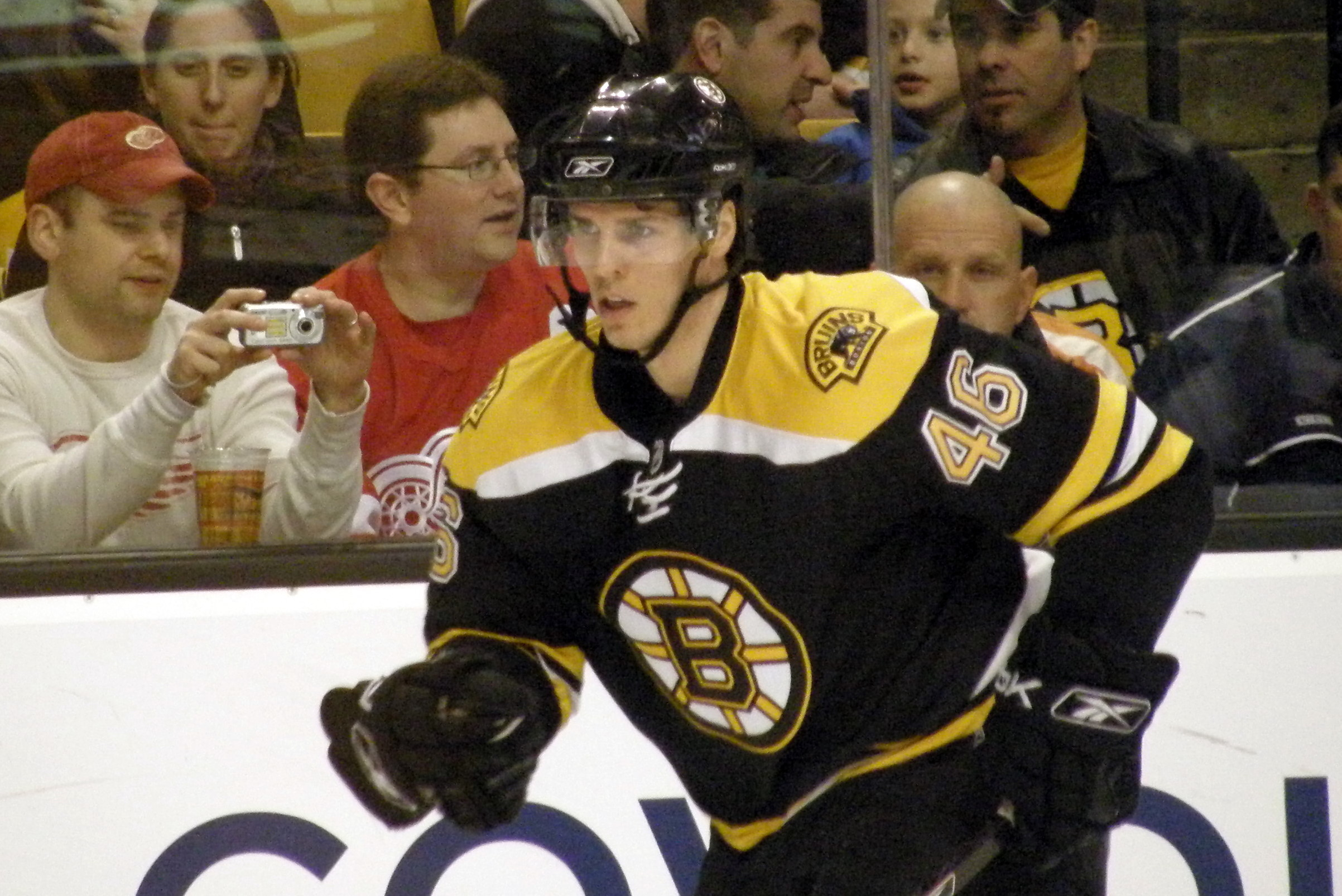
David Krejci during the 2007–08 season. Younger players on the Bruins roster, including Krejci, broke out during that season.

The 2008 campaign got to witness the Bruins regain some respectability, finishing 41–29–12 and making the playoffs. The season ended on a bright note for the Bruins when they forced the Montreal Canadiens to play a seven-game playoff series, including a memorable game six in which Boston came back to win 5–4. Their performance, despite a 5–0 loss in the seventh game, rekindled interest in the team in New England, where the Bruins had for years been heavily overshadowed by the Red Sox, Patriots and Celtics, all of whom had recently won championships in their respective leagues. Although Bruins center Patrice Bergeron was injured with a concussion most of the season, youngsters Milan Lucic, David Krejci, Vladimir Sobotka and Petteri Nokelainen showed promise in the playoffs.

After a slow start to the 2008–09 season, the Bruins won 17 of their next 20 games, leading many to see them as a revival of the "Big Bad Bruins" from the 1970s and 1980s. During the 2009 All-Star Weekend's Skills Competition, captain Zdeno Chara fired the NHL's then-fastest measured "hardest shot" ever, with a clocked in speed of 105.4 mph (169.7 km/h) velocity. (Chara has since broken his own record three times, two of those on the same night.) The number of injured players in the season saw many call-ups from the Bruins' American Hockey League (AHL) Providence Bruins farm team, with rookie defenseman Matt Hunwick and forward Byron Bitz seeing success. The Bruins went on to have the best record in the Eastern Conference and qualified for the playoffs for the fifth time in nine years, facing the Canadiens in the playoffs for the fourth time during that span, defeating them in four games before losing in seven games to the Carolina Hurricanes in the conference semi-finals.

The 2009 summer off-season saw the departure of long-time defensive forward P. J. Axelsson from Sweden, who signed a multi-year contract with his hometown Frölunda HC team. With Toronto Maple Leafs general manager Brian Burke threatening an offer sheet and Bruins management unable to meet his salary demands, forward Phil Kessel was traded to Toronto for a trio of future draft picks.

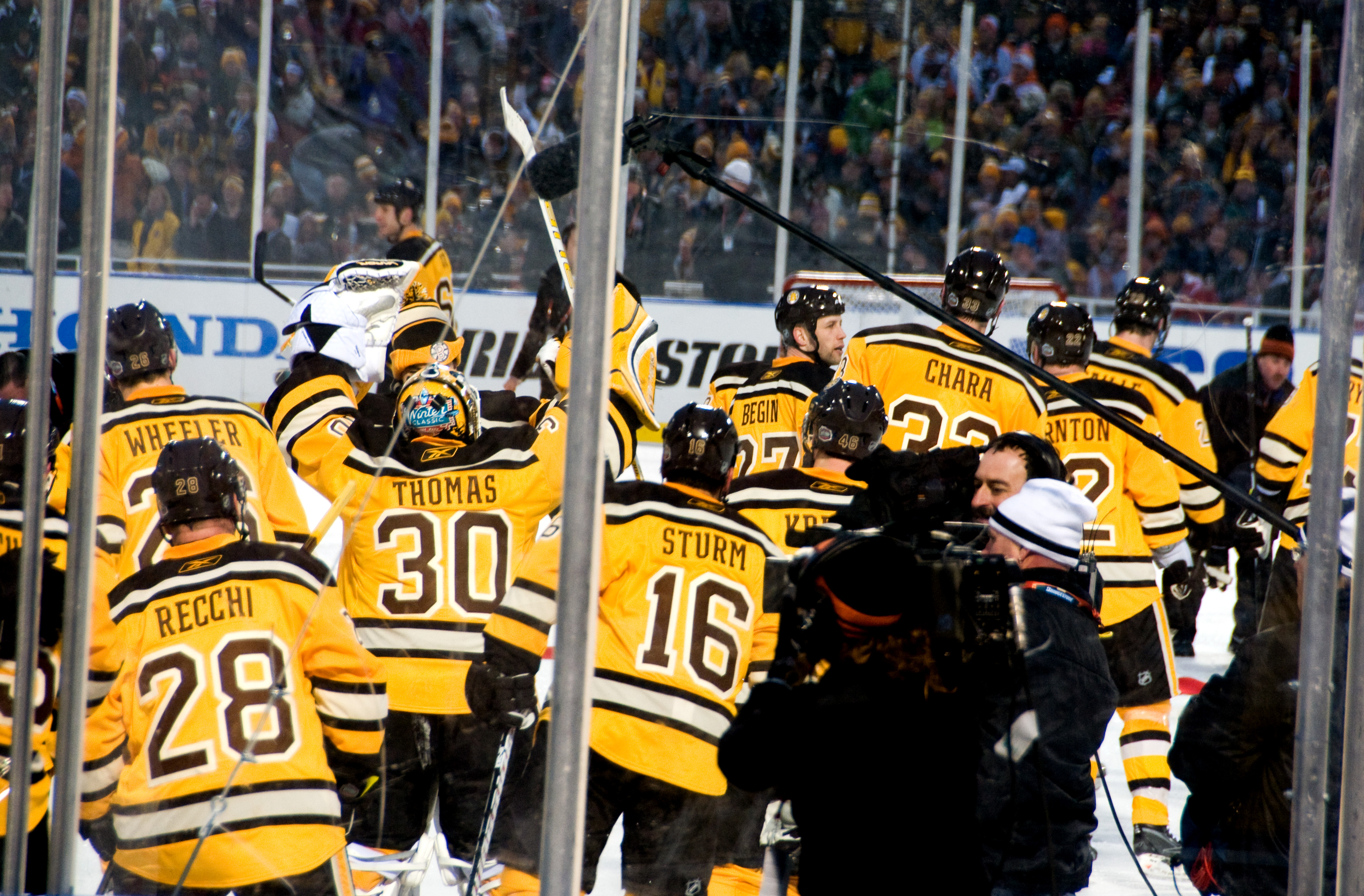
The Bruins celebrate after winning the 2010 NHL Winter Classic. For the game, the Bruins hosted the Philadelphia Flyers at Fenway Park.

On January 1, 2010, the Bruins won the 2010 NHL Winter Classic over the Philadelphia Flyers in a 2–1 overtime decision at Fenway Park, thus becoming the first home team to win an outdoor classic game. However, following the New Year's Day game, the Bruins, hobbled by injuries, would go through a five-week-long period of lackluster play, with only two wins and compiling ten regulation losses earning them only eight points in the Eastern Conference standings in that 15-game long period, before breaking the losing streak in an away game against the Canadiens on February 7, with Tuukka Rask shutting out the Habs 3–0. The win over the Canadiens was the first of four successive victories leading into the break in play for the NHL's participation in the 2010 Winter Olympics, and established Tuukka Rask as the number one goaltender for the Bruins, as Tim Thomas would only start 8 of the 22 games remaining in the post-Olympic period of the season, with Rask winning eight of his post-Olympic starts, including two shutouts. Thomas was on the silver medal-winning U.S. team, with Patrice Bergeron on the gold medal-winning Canadian team.

The importance of former Buffalo Sabres forward Daniel Paille's acquisition by the Bruins, and his emergence as a penalty-killing forward, was emphasized on April 10, 2010, as Paille, Steve Begin and Blake Wheeler combined for the first-ever known trio of short handed goals within one penalty kill, in only 1:04 of game time, in a home game against the Carolina Hurricanes, helping the Bruins to sixth place in the NHL Eastern Conference, and a 2010 NHL playoff opening round appearance against the Buffalo Sabres, which they won 4–2. Boston became only the third team in NHL history to lose a playoff series after leading 3–0 when they lost in game seven to the Philadelphia Flyers after losing a 3–0 lead in the second round on May 14, 2010, also losing the services of Marco Sturm in the first game and playmaking center David Krejci to injury in the third game of the series.

=== Return to contention and sixth Stanley Cup championship (2010–2015) ===
On April 13, 2010, the Boston Bruins received the second overall draft pick for the 2010 NHL entry draft, having received it via the trade that sent Phil Kessel to the Toronto Maple Leafs. With the pick, the Bruins selected Tyler Seguin on June 25, 2010. In other off-season moves, Greg Campbell and Nathan Horton joined the team, and Vladimir Sobotka and Dennis Wideman left the Bruins in the 2010 free agency. After the season ended on June 16, 2010, Cam Neely was named the new team president of the Bruins.

On September 8, 2010, the Boston Bruins entered an affiliate with SM-Liiga (Finnish Elite league) team JYP Jyväskylä. Under the terms of the partnership, the two organizations will be able to transfer contracted players on loan to each other.

On February 15, 2011, the Bruins acquired center Chris Kelly from the Ottawa Senators after Marc Savard's attempted comeback ended due to another concussion, this one delivered away at Colorado by former Bruin Matt Hunwick. Ottawa received the Bruins' second-round pick in 2011. Just two days later and on the brink of the trade deadline, the Bruins acquired defenseman Tomas Kaberle in a trade from the Toronto Maple Leafs in exchange for prospect Joe Colborne, a first-round selection in 2011 and a potential second-round pick in 2012 (which became official on May 27 when the Bruins clinched a berth in the Stanley Cup Final). Mark Stuart and Blake Wheeler were also traded to the Atlanta Thrashers for Rich Peverley and Boris Valabik.

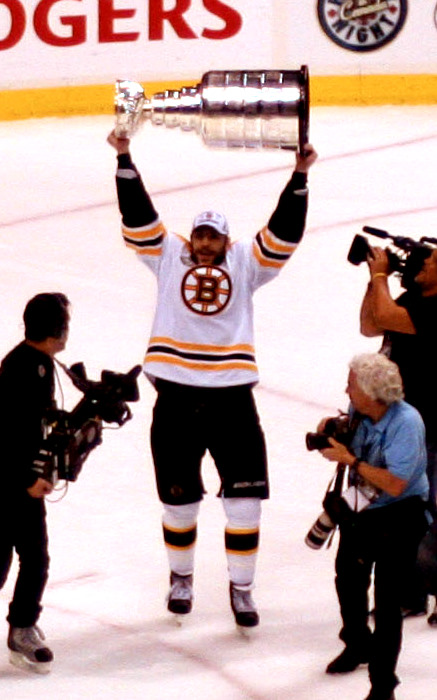
Milan Lucic with the Stanley Cup after the Bruins defeated the Vancouver Canucks in game seven of the 2011 Stanley Cup Final.

In the 2011 Stanley Cup playoffs, the Bruins became the first team in NHL history to win a seven-game series without scoring a power-play goal, as they eliminated the Montreal Canadiens in seven games, and also won their first playoff series after trailing 2–0. On May 6, the Bruins swept the Philadelphia Flyers in four games to advance to the Eastern Conference Finals for the first time since 1992. Boston then defeated the Tampa Bay Lightning in seven games and advanced to the Stanley Cup Final for the first time since 1990 to face the Presidents' Trophy-winning Vancouver Canucks.

The Bruins lost the first two games of the series in very close contests, 1–0, on a Raffi Torres goal with less than 19 seconds left in regulation, and then 3–2 in overtime. Game three did not start well for the Bruins either, as they lost Nathan Horton to injury at the 5:07 mark of the first period following a late hit by Canucks defenseman Aaron Rome that left Horton prone on the ice for nearly ten minutes. Despite losing Horton, the Bruins defeated the Canucks with four goals in each of the second and third periods, twice scoring short-handed goals, and going on to win, 8–1. It was the highest score by one team, and largest winning margin, in a Finals game since 1996. Game four saw the Bruins defeating the Canucks in a 4–0 shutout. The home team continued to be the winner, with game five on June 15 in Vancouver going to the Canucks in a 1–0 shutout, then game six on June 13 going to the Bruins, who defeated the Canucks 5–2 to prevent the Canucks from clinching the Stanley Cup. The Bruins set a new record for the quickest four goals ever in a playoff series game, scoring in only 4:14 of game time in the first period of game six. Game seven, which was played in Vancouver on June 15, was the first time the Bruins have ever played in game seven of the Stanley Cup Final. The Bruins shut out Vancouver 4–0 after two goals each from Patrice Bergeron and Brad Marchand, winning the sixth Stanley Cup in franchise history and breaking a 39-year Cup drought. The 2010–11 Bruins were the first team in NHL history to win a game seven three times in the same playoff run.

The championship also meant that all four Boston teams had won their respective championships at least once in the previous decade after the Red Sox won two World Series, the Patriots won three Super Bowls and the Celtics recaptured an NBA championship. Following the Stanley Cup Final, Boston Globe columnist Dan Shaughnessy ranked all seven championships during the decade and ranked the Bruins' 2011 Stanley Cup triumph as third, behind only the Patriots winning Super Bowl XXXVI (second) and the Red Sox winning the 2004 World Series (first, breaking the "Curse of the Bambino").

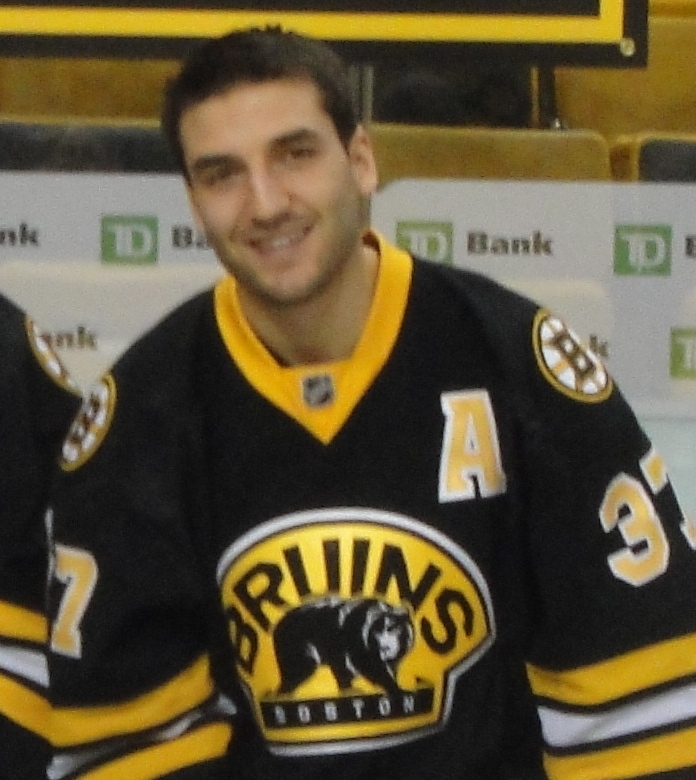
Patrice Bergeron scored two of Boston's four goals in game seven of the Stanley Cup Final

Following their Stanley Cup win, the Bruins lost Mark Recchi to retirement and Michael Ryder and Tomas Kaberle to free agency. The Bruins tweaked their roster by adding defenseman Joe Corvo and forward Benoit Pouliot. On October 6, 2011, prior their first home game of the 2011–12 season against Philadelphia, the Bruins raised their 2011 Stanley Cup Champions Banner to the roof at TD Garden. Members of the 1972 Championship Team, with Milt Schmidt and Bobby Orr leading the way, participated in the official Banner Raising Ceremony. The Bruins' short summer took its toll early, going 3–7–0 in the month of October, before responding with a 21–3–1 record to cap off 2011, highlighted by a near-perfect November in which the team did not lose in regulation. Sophomore forward Tyler Seguin shone the brightest during the streak, eventually paving the way for his first All-Star Game selection, joining teammates Zdeno Chara and Tim Thomas on Team Chara. On January 23, Thomas caused a stir by not attending the Bruins' visit to the White House, saying the government had "grown out of control". After an 8–4–1 record to begin 2012, the Bruins' inconsistent form resurfaced for much of February and March, during which they endured key injuries to Nathan Horton (concussion) and Tuukka Rask (groin), and an impotent power play. At the February 27 trading deadline, they traded for Greg Zanon, Mike Mottau and one-time Bruin Brian Rolston, then signed goalie Marty Turco to add goaltending depth. The Bruins went on to finish second in the Eastern Conference with 102 points, winning the Northeast Division title.

They faced the Washington Capitals in the first round of the 2012 Stanley Cup playoffs. In a seven-game series in which all of the games were decided by only one goal, the Bruins came up short against rookie goalie Braden Holtby and head coach Dale Hunter's defensive-minded game plan. The seventh game saw Joel Ward deflect the series-winning goal past Tim Thomas in overtime to give the Capitals the victory and end the Bruins' season.

During the off-season preceding the lockout, Tim Thomas made his decision to sit out the 2012–13 season. General manager Peter Chiarelli confirmed Thomas' decision. Thomas was first suspended for not reporting to training camp, then his rights were traded to the New York Islanders on February 7. The Bruins decided to go with the goaltending pair of Tuukka Rask and Anton Khudobin for the season. Meanwhile, highly touted prospect Dougie Hamilton was promoted to the main roster after spending a season in the juniors.

The Bruins battled the Montreal Canadiens for leadership in the Northeast Division all season, before a loss to the Ottawa Senators in a make-up game following the Boston Marathon bombing on April 28 gave the Canadiens the division title. Boston settled for fourth place in the Eastern Conference standings with 62 points. On April 2, the Bruins acquired former All-Star Jaromir Jagr from the Dallas Stars, after failing to acquire Jarome Iginla from the Calgary Flames. Jagr would end up being a winger for the Patrice Bergeron–Brad Marchand forward line, as usual winger Tyler Seguin was transferred to the third line with Chris Kelly and Rich Peverley, to give a more even scoring threat across all four forward lines for the Bruins.

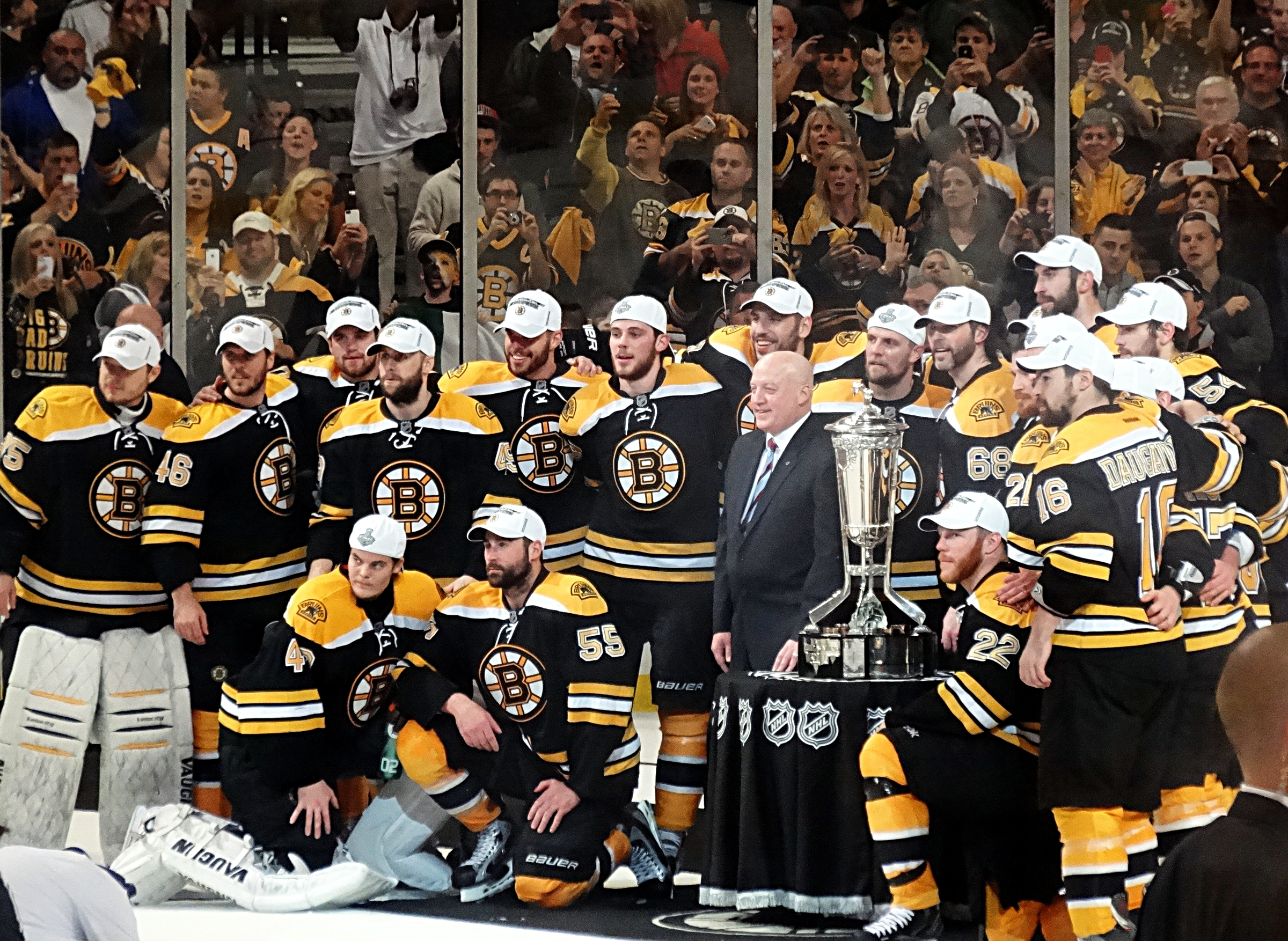
The Bruins were the 2013 Eastern Conference champions, their second Conference title in three years.

In the opening round of the 2013 playoffs, the Bruins took on the Toronto Maple Leafs. After leading the series 3–1 with a pair of wins in Toronto, the Maple Leafs won games five and six to force game seven in Boston. Toronto led 4–1 in the third period of the decider, before the Bruins came back late with three goals. A goal from Nathan Horton 9:18 into the period cut the deficit to two, but the Bruins were unable to cut more into the lead until late in the period, when Milan Lucic and Patrice Bergeron scored at 18:38 and 19:09 respectively with the goalie pulled to tie the game at four. Bergeron would score again in overtime, netting the series winner to eliminate the Maple Leafs. Boston's game seven win marked the first time a team came back from a three-goal deficit in the third period to win a playoff game. In the second round, Boston led 3–0 against the New York Rangers before winning the series in five games. Boston then defeated the Pittsburgh Penguins in the Eastern Conference Finals in a four-game sweep to advance to the Stanley Cup Final. In the Final, they faced the Presidents’ Trophy-winning Chicago Blackhawks. The Bruins fell in six games, with three going into overtime, including an epic game one in which a third overtime period was needed before it was settled. The only game Boston lost by more than one goal was game five in which Chicago scored on an empty net in the last 17 seconds.

The 2013 Stanley Cup run by the Bruins was one that further united the New England region that had been rocked by tragedies, such as the Boston Marathon bombing and the Sandy Hook Elementary School shooting. Head coach Claude Julien said after the deciding game six, "You know, at the end of the day, I think that's what hurts the most is in the back of our minds, although we needed to focus on our team and doing what was going to be the best thing for our team to win a Stanley Cup, in the back of our minds we wanted to do it for those kind of reasons, the City of Boston, what Newtown has been through, that kind of stuff. It hit close to home, and the best way we felt we could try and cheer the area was to win a Stanley Cup. I think that's what's hard right now for the players. We had more reasons than just ourselves to win a Cup."

In the 2013–14 season, the Bruins won the Presidents' Trophy after finishing first in the newly formed Atlantic Division with a record of 54–19–9 for 117 points. Their regular-season success, however, would not translate into another Eastern Conference Finals appearance. Despite winning their first-round series against the Detroit Red Wings, the team fell to the Canadiens in seven games in the Eastern Conference Semi-finals during the 2014 playoffs.

In the 2014–15 season, the Bruins finished with a record of 41–27–14 for 96 points, missing out on the playoffs by just two points after the Pittsburgh Penguins and the Ottawa Senators clinched the final two playoff spots in the East. The Bruins therefore became only the third team to miss the playoffs after winning the Presidents' Trophy in the previous season. The 96 points they earned that season broke the record for the most points earned by a team that did not make the playoffs. The Colorado Avalanche finished with 95 points in 2006–07 along with the Dallas Stars in 2010–11, which was the previous record.

== Don Sweeney era (2015–present) ==
On April 15, 2015, Peter Chiarelli was fired by the Boston Bruins. On May 20, the Bruins named former player Don Sweeney as the team's new general manager for the 2015–16 season. One recent all-time franchise achievement the Bruins attained in the 2015–16 season is shared by only their greatest rival, the Canadiens – a total of 3,000 wins in the team's existence, achieved by the Bruins on January 8, 2016, in a 4–1 road victory against the New Jersey Devils. The team was seen as a playoff contender throughout the regular season. However, a sub-.500 record on home ice and frequent road losses in the final two months of the regular season resulted in a three-way battle for the final playoff spot in the East. The Bruins had a chance to clinch the final playoff berth with a win over the Ottawa Senators on the second-to-last day of the season, but they lost the game. That loss, combined with a Flyers' win over the Penguins, knocked the Bruins out of playoff contention by three points in favor of the Flyers. For the first time since the two seasons following the 2004–05 lockout, the Bruins did not qualify for the playoffs in two consecutive seasons.

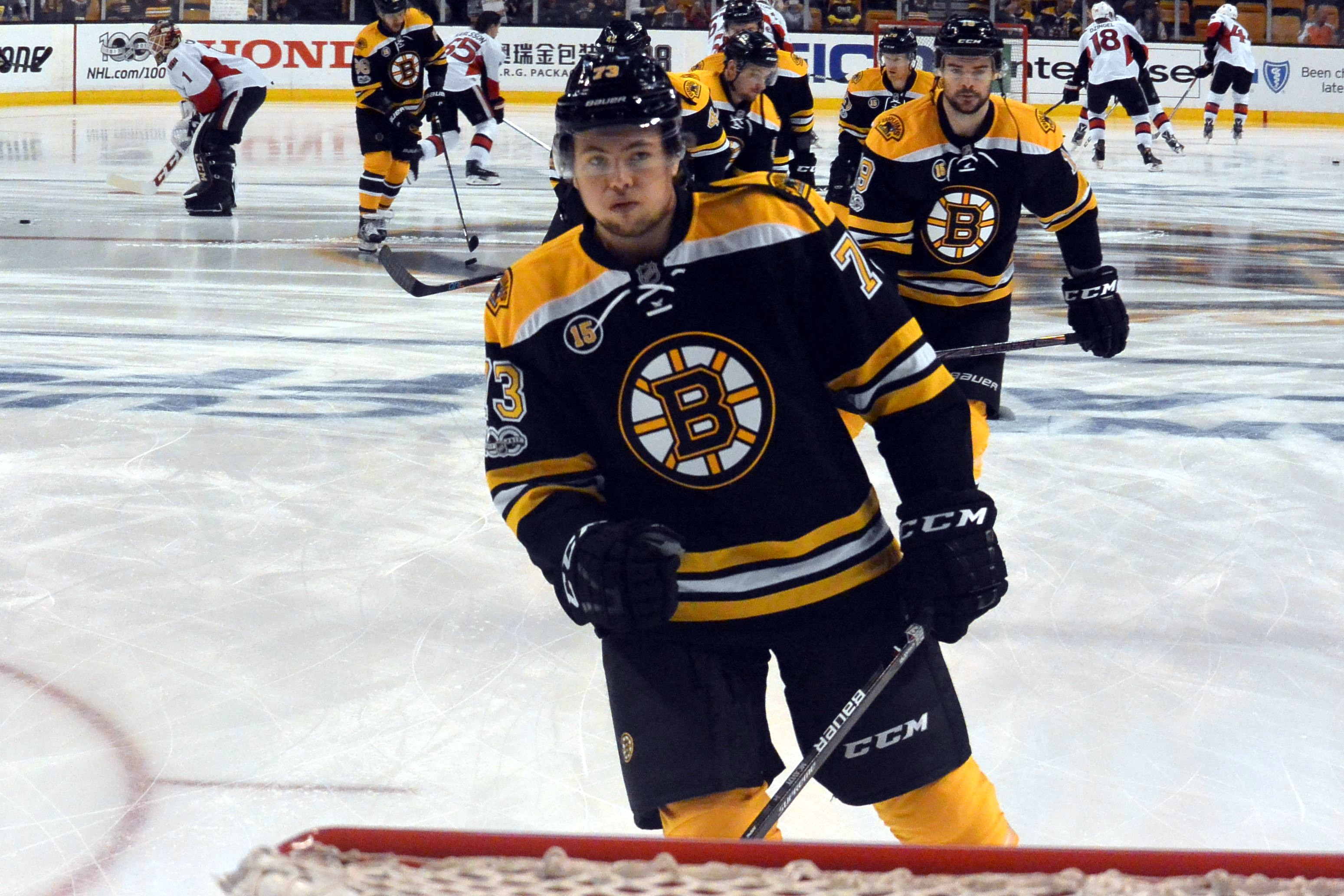
Charlie McAvoy and other players warming up prior to a game in the 2017 Stanley Cup playoffs. The Bruins qualified for the Stanley Cup playoffs for the first time since 2014.

During the last two months of the 2016–17 regular season, the Bruins fired head coach Claude Julien and promoted Bruce Cassidy to interim coach. Cassidy's very slight changes in coaching to emphasize the players' speed and hockey skills, as opposed to Julien's, resulted in the Bruins achieving an 18–8–1 record through their remaining regular-season games, finishing third in the Atlantic Division and qualifying for the playoffs for the first time since the 2013–14 season. In the first round of the playoffs, the Bruins lost to the Ottawa Senators in six games.

Cassidy returned as head coach for the 2017–18 season, leading the Bruins to the playoffs for the second straight year. They had a record of 50–20–12, including an 18-game point streak, which lasted from December 14, 2017, to January 25, 2018. They finished one point behind the Tampa Bay Lightning for top spot in the Atlantic Division. They defeated the Toronto Maple Leafs in the first round, 4–3, but ultimately lost to the Lightning in round two, 4–1. The season saw young players perform well, including Jake DeBrusk, Danton Heinen, Ryan Donato, and Charlie McAvoy. The Bruins also acquired veterans Rick Nash, Nick Holden, Brian Gionta, and Tommy Wingels through trades or through free-agent signings.

During the 2018–19 season the Bruins finished the regular season in second place in the division with a 49–24–9 overall record. During the trade deadline the team acquired Charlie Coyle and Marcus Johansson. In the first round of the 2019 Stanley Cup playoffs, as in the previous season, they faced the Maple Leafs, defeating them in seven games. In a six-game series, the Bruins defeated the Columbus Blue Jackets in the second round, and advanced to the Eastern Conference Finals for the first time since 2013. The Bruins would later win the Eastern Conference Finals by sweeping out the Carolina Hurricanes in four games, thus winning the Prince of Wales Trophy and advancing to the 2019 Stanley Cup Final for the third time in ten years. They faced the St. Louis Blues in a rematch of the 1970 Stanley Cup Final. This time however, the Blues would emerge victorious, winning in seven games.

During the 2019–20 season, the Bruins consistently had the best record in the Atlantic Division and were near the top of the league. During the trade deadline, they acquired Ondrej Kase and Nick Ritchie, both from the Anaheim Ducks, in two separate trades. On March 12, 2020, the NHL season was paused due to the COVID-19 pandemic. At the time of the pause, the Bruins were first overall in the league, with 100 points. On May 26, Commissioner Gary Bettman announced that the 2019–20 regular season was completed, and that the league would resume with the playoffs. The Bruins were awarded the Presidents' Trophy for the second time in a decade, while David Pastrnak's 48 goals made him the first Bruin to win the Maurice "Rocket" Richard Trophy, which he shared with Alexander Ovechkin. During the 2020 Stanley Cup playoffs, the Bruins won the first round against the Carolina Hurricanes in five games, but lost to the Tampa Bay Lightning in the second round, also in five games. In the 2020–21 season, the Bruins made the 2021 playoffs, where they defeated the Washington Capitals in five games, but lost to the New York Islanders in six games. In the next season, the Bruins clinched the 2022 playoffs as a wild card, but were defeated by the Hurricanes in seven games. Following the season, head coach Cassidy was fired. They then hired Jim Montgomery, previously the head coach of the Dallas Stars, as their next head coach on July 3, 2022.

During the 2022–23 season, the Bruins broke NHL records and led the Atlantic Division for the entire season. First, they set an NHL record for longest home winning streak from the start of a season (14) from October 15 to December 3. Then on March 2, 2023, the Bruins recorded their 100th standings point of the season in their 61st game, becoming the fastest team to 100 points in NHL history, and surpassing the record previously held by the 1976–77 Stanley Cup Champion Montreal Canadiens. Nine days later, they set an all-time NHL record as the fastest team to achieve 50 wins, hitting the mark in 64 games compared to a previous record of 66 games held jointly by the 1995–96 Detroit Red Wings and the 2018–19 Tampa Bay Lightning. In that same game, the Bruins became the third-fastest team in history to clinch a playoff spot during the era of 82-game seasons, trailing only the 1995–96 Detroit Red Wings (59 games) and the 1998–99 Dallas Stars (63 games). On April 9, 2023, the Bruins set the new all-time record for most games won in a season (63), when they defeated the Philadelphia Flyers. Two days later, the Bruins set the new all-time single-season points record (133), when they defeated the Washington Capitals, and they finished the season with 65 wins and 135 points. The Bruins lost to the Florida Panthers in seven games in the opening round of the 2023 Stanley Cup playoffs after giving up a 3–1 series lead. After the season, team captain and franchise face Patrice Bergeron announced his retirement, after winning an unprecedented sixth Frank Selke Trophy as the league's best defensive forward. A few weeks later, fellow long-time Bruin David Krejci also announced his retirement.
