= Geneva Protocol (1924) =

Proposal to the League of Nations

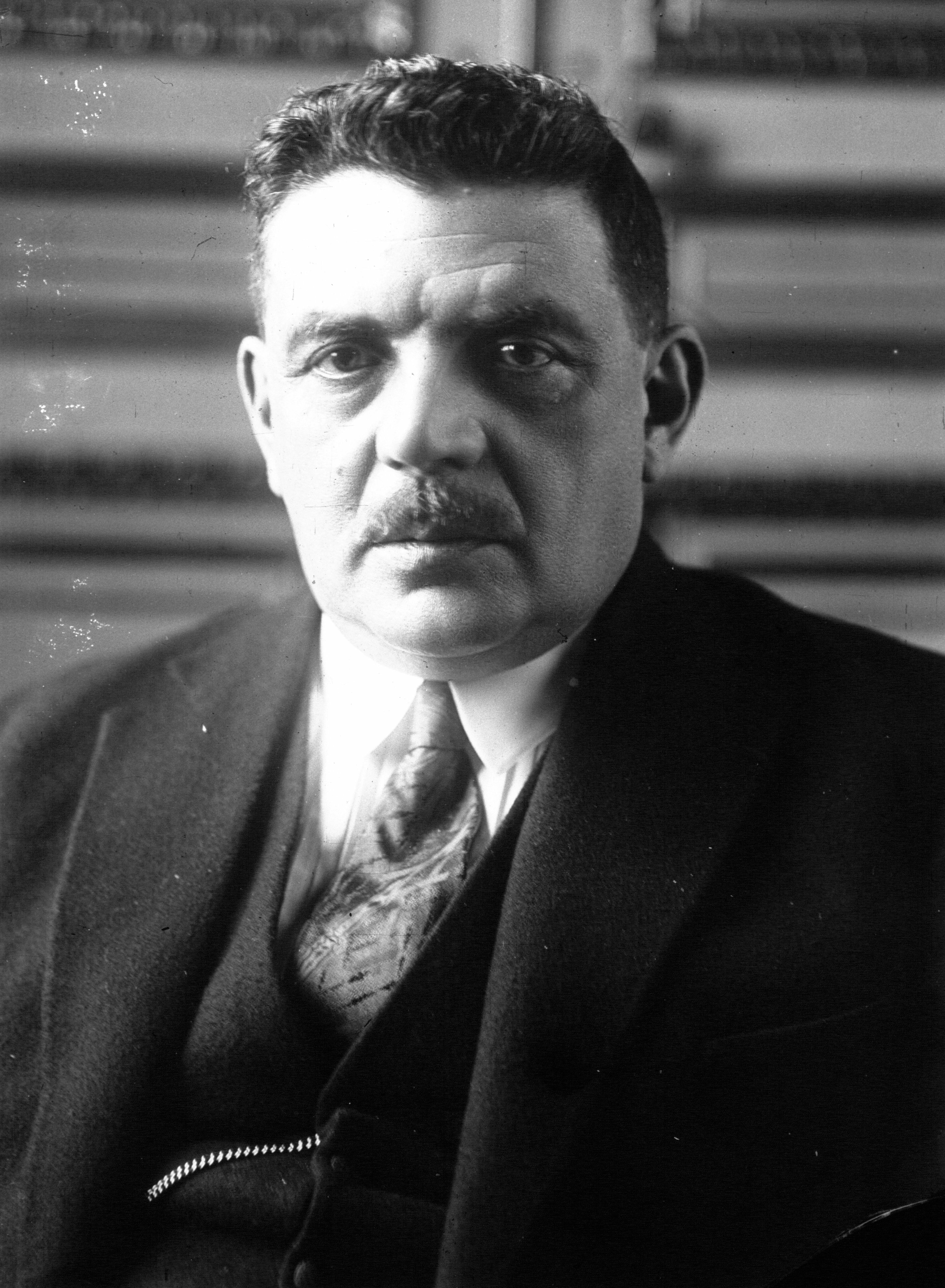
Édouard Herriot, Président du Conseil (1924)

The Geneva Protocol for the Pacific Settlement of International Disputes was a proposal to the League of Nations presented by British Prime Minister Ramsay MacDonald and his French counterpart Édouard Herriot. It set up compulsory arbitration of disputes and created a method to determine the aggressor in international conflicts. All legal disputes between nations would be submitted to the World Court. It called for a disarmament conference in 1925.

Any government that refused to comply in a dispute would be named an aggressor. Any victim of aggression was to receive immediate assistance from League members. British Conservatives condemned the proposal for fear that it would lead to conflict with the United States, which also opposed the proposal, and so it was shelved. The Geneva Protocol solved thus one problem cleverly (i.e. by providing that any State that resorted to war without first submitting to the international dispute settlement machinery was an aggressor). But in solving this problem, the Protocol created a new one: the enforcement mechanism was drawn on the League of Nations' mechanism (i.e. Articles 10 & 16 Versailles Treaty) thus leaving war a perfectly legal response for those States that had not joined the League. Moreover, by providing for financial and commercial sanctions, Parties to Protocol might be required to infringe upon their neutral commitments since they were legally obliged to impose sanctions against an aggressor.

The Protocol envisaged wide-ranging regulations to bring about general disarmament, effective international security and the compulsory arbitration of disputes. In the Geneva Protocol the member states would declare themselves “ready to consent to important limitations of their sovereignty in favor of the League of Nations” (Wehberg). After preliminary approval on 2 October 1924 by all the 47 member states of the League of Nations at the 5th General Assembly, however, it was not ratified by the United Kingdom the following year under the newly elected government of Stanley Baldwin, with Austen Chamberlain as Secretary of State for Foreign Affairs (from 1924 to 1929). The Protocol subsequently failed to materialize.

== See also ==
- Kellogg–Briand Pact
- Permanent Court of Arbitration
- International Court of Justice
- Conference for the Reduction and Limitation of Armaments
- Conference on Disarmament
- Rome Statute

== Bibliography ==
- Burks, David D. "The United States and the Geneva Protocol of 1924: 'A New Holy Alliance'? American Historical Review (1959) 64#4 pp. 891–905 in JSTOR
- Miller, David Hunter. The Geneva Protocol (Macmillan, 1925) online.
- Noel-Baker, Philip (1925). The Geneva Protocol for the Pacific Settlement of International Disputes. London: P. S. King & Son Ltd.
- Wehberg, Hans (1931). The Outlawry of War: A Series of Lectures Delivered Before the Academy of International Law at the Hague and in the Institut Universitaire de Hautes Etudes Internationales at Geneva. Washington: Carnegie Endowment for International Peace.
- Williams, John F. "The Geneva Protocol of 1924 for the Pacific Settlement of International Disputes." Journal of the British Institute of International Affairs 3.6 (1924): 288-304.
