= List of Cornell Law School alumni =

This is a list of notable alumni of the Cornell Law School.

== Academia ==
- Jessica Berg (1994), dean and professor at UC Davis School of Law
- Edward J. Bloustein (1959), former president of Rutgers University
- Jonathan Brand (1996), 15th president of Cornell College and president of Doane University
- Douglas Burgess (2002), professor of history in Yeshiva University and an affiliated professor at Benjamin N Cardozo School of Law
- Hannah Buxbaum (1992), John E. Schiller Chair in Legal Ethics at Indiana University School of Law
- Terry Calvani (1972), former professor of Antitrust Law at Vanderbilt University Law School, FTC commissioner, and member of the Competition Authority (Ireland)
- Paul L. Caron (1983), Duane and Kelly Roberts Dean of the Pepperdine University School of Law
- Dan Coenen (1978), University Professor and Harmon W. Caldwell Chair in Constitutional Law at the University of Georgia Law School
- Anna Dolidze (JSD 2013), professor of International Law at the University of Western Ontario
- Marc A. Franklin (1956), Frederick I. Richman Professor of Law at Stanford Law School
- Charles Garside (1923), former president of the State University of New York
- Michael Goldsmith (1975), Woodruff J. Deem Professor of Law at Brigham Young University Law School
- William B. Gould IV (1961), Charles A. Beardsley Professor of Law at Stanford Law School
- Ernest Huffcut (1888), professor of Law at Indiana University School of Law
- Julie O'Sullivan (1984), Agnes Williams Sesquicentennial Professor of Law at Georgetown University Law Center
- John W. Reed (1942), Thomas M. Cooley Professor of Law at the University of Michigan Law School
- Ruth Roemer (1939), professor at the UCLA Fielding School of Public Health; namesake of Ruth Roemer Social Justice Leadership Award
- R. Smith Simpson (1931), co-creator with Peter F. Krogh of the Institute for the Study of Diplomacy at Georgetown University's Edmund A. Walsh School of Foreign Service

== Business ==
- J. Carter Bacot (1958), former president and CEO of the Bank of New York
- Val A. Browning (1918), president and board chairman of the Browning Arms Company
- Gerald Cassidy (1967), co-founder and CEO of Cassidy & Associates, author, and lobbyist
- Louis W. Dawson (1919), president of the Mutual Life Insurance Company of New York
- Henry D. Edelman (1973), first president and chief executive officer of the Federal Agricultural Mortgage Corporation
- Sol Linowitz (1938), chairman of Xerox
- Seth Metcalf (2004), financial technology executive and former Ohio deputy treasurer
- Myron Charles Taylor (1894), CEO of U.S. Steel
- Robert D. Ziff (1992), former co-CEO of Ziff Brothers Investments

== Entertainment ==
- Frank Joslyn Baum (1905), film producer and author, son of L. Frank Baum
- Steven W. Carabatsos, screenwriter and story editor for Star Trek
- Michael S. Chernuchin (1981), television writer and producer who worked on Law & Order and Brooklyn South
- Alan Klingenstein (J.D./MBA 1982) - film producer, distributor, and entertainment executive. Credits include Two Family House, winner of the Audience Award at the Sundance Film Festival
- Frank Rosenfelt (1950), former CEO of Metro-Goldwyn-Mayer (MGM) Studio

== Government ==
=== United States government ===
==== Executive branch ====
===== U.S. attorneys general =====
- Arnold Burns (1953), served as United States deputy attorney general
- William P. Rogers (1937), served as United States attorney general

===== Other cabinet and cabinet-level officials =====
- William J. Lynn III (1980), United States Deputy Secretary of Defense
- Edmund Muskie (1939), United States Secretary of State, received the Presidential Medal of Freedom in 1981
- Samuel Pierce (1949), United States Secretary of Housing and Urban Development
- William P. Rogers (1937), United States Secretary of State, received the Presidential Medal of Freedom in 1973

==== Legislative branch (U.S. Congress) ====
===== Senators =====
- Edmund Muskie (1939), United States senator from Maine (1959–1980)

===== Representatives =====
- John G. Alexander (1916), United States representative for Minnesota's 3rd congressional district (1939–1941)
- Rob Andrews (1982), United States representative for New Jersey's 1st congressional district (1990–2014)
- Katherine Clark (1989), United States representative for Massachusetts's 5th congressional district (2013–present)
- Barber Conable (1948), United States representative for New York's 30th congressional district (1983–1985), president of the World Bank (1986–1991)
- Sharice Davids (2010), United States representative for Kansas's 3rd congressional district (2019–present)
- Reuben L. Haskell (1898), United States representative for New York's 10th congressional district (1915–1919)
- Frank Horton (1947), United States representative for New York's 36th congressional district (1963–1973), 34th district (1973–1983), and 29th district (1983–1993)
- Charles Samuel Joelson (1939), United States representative for New Jersey's 8th congressional district (1961–1969)
- Norman F. Lent (1957), United States representative for New York's 4th congressional district (1973–1993)
- Edward Worthington Pattison (1957), United States representative for New York's 29th congressional district (1975–1979)
- John Raymond Pillion (1927), United States representative for New York's 42nd congressional district (1953–1965)
- Alexander Pirnie (1926), United States representative for New York's 34th congressional district (1959–1963) and 32nd district (1963–1973), awarded the Legion of Merit and Bronze Star Medal for service in Europe during World War II
- Howard W. Robison (1939), United States representative for New York's 39th congressional district (1958–1975)
- Henry P. Smith (1936), United States representative for New York's 40th congressional district (1965–1973)

==== Judicial branch ====
===== Federal courts of appeals =====
- Mark J. Bennett (1979), United States Court of Appeals for the Ninth Circuit
- Robert Boochever (1941), United States Court of Appeals for the Ninth Circuit (1980–1986)
- Peter W. Hall (1977), United States Court of Appeals for the Second Circuit (2004–2021)
- Alison J. Nathan (2000), United States Court of Appeals for the Second Circuit
- Amy J. St. Eve (1990), United States Court of Appeals for the Seventh Circuit
- Elbert Parr Tuttle (1923), one of the "Fifth Circuit Four," United States Court of Appeals for the Fifth Circuit (1954–1981), United States Court of Appeals for the Eleventh Circuit (1981–1996), and chief judge of the Fifth Circuit 1960–1967; received the Presidential Medal of Freedom in 1981; the courthouse for the United States Court of Appeals for the Eleventh Circuit is named in his honor
- Ellsworth Van Graafeiland (1940), United States Court of Appeals for the Second Circuit (1974–2004)
- Richard C. Wesley (1974), United States Court of Appeals for the Second Circuit

===== Federal district courts =====
- Simon L. Adler (1889), United States District Court for the Western District of New York (1928–1934)
- Frederic Block (1959), United States District Court for the Eastern District of New York (1994–present)
- Leonie Brinkema (1976), United States District Court for the Eastern District of Virginia (1993–present)
- John M. Cashin (1915), United States District Court for the Southern District of New York (1955–1970)
- John H. Chun (1994), United States District Court for the Western District of Washington (2022–present)
- Albert Wheeler Coffrin (1947), United States District Court for the District of Vermont (1972–1993), chief judge of the District of Vermont 1983–1988
- Brian Cogan (1979), United States District Court for the Eastern District of New York (2006–present)
- Alfred Conkling Coxe Jr. (1903), United States District Court for the Southern District of New York (1929–1957)
- Paul A. Crotty (1967), United States District Court for the Southern District of New York
- Phillip S. Figa (1976), United States District Court for the District of Colorado (2003–2008)
- Robert Dixon Herman (1938), United States District Court for the Middle District of Pennsylvania (1969–1990)
- Frederick Bernard Lacey (1948), United States District Court for the District of New Jersey (1971–1986)
- Lloyd Francis MacMahon (1938), United States District Court for the Southern District of New York (1959–1989), chief judge of the Southern District of New York 1980–1982
- Anne M. Nardacci (2002), United States District Court for the Northern District of New York
- Stacey D. Neumann (2005), United States District Court for the District of Maine (2024– )
- Pamela Pepper (1989), United States District Court for the Eastern District of Wisconsin, chief judge of the Eastern District of Wisconsin from 2019
- Hernan Gregorio Pesquera (1948), United States District Court for the District of Puerto Rico (1972–1982), chief judge of the District of Puerto Rico 1980–1982
- Aubrey Eugene Robinson (1947), United States District Court for the District of Columbia (1966–2000), chief judge of the District of Columbia 1982–1992
- Stephen C. Robinson (1984), United States District Court for the Southern District of New York (2003–2010)
- Shira Scheindlin (1975), United States District Court for the Southern District of New York (1994–2012)
- Karen Gren Scholer (1982), United States District Court for the Northern District of Texas (2018–present)
- Gary L. Sharpe (1974), United States District Court for the Northern District of New York (2004–present), chief judge of the Northern District of New York from 2011
- Roger Gordon Strand (1961), United States District Court for the District of Arizona (1985–2000)
- Joseph L. Tauro (1956), United States District Court for the District of Massachusetts (1972–2013), chief judge of the District of Massachusetts 1992–1999
- Christy C. Wiegand (2000), United States District Court for the Western District of Pennsylvania (2020–present)
- Thomas Samuel Zilly (1962), United States District Court for the Western District of Washington (1988–2004)

===== Other federal courts =====
- Mary H. Donlon (1920), United States Customs Court (now the United States Court of International Trade) (1955–1977)

==== U.S. diplomatic figures ====
- Arthur Dean (1923), special deputy secretary of state with the rank of ambassador; chief U.S. negotiator of the Korean Armistice Agreement
- Sol Linowitz (1938), United States ambassador to the Organization of American States, received the Presidential Medal of Freedom in 1998
- Michael Punke (1989), United States ambassador to the World Trade Organization (2010–2017)
- William vanden Heuvel (1952), representative of the United States to the European Office of the United Nations

==== Other U.S. government figures ====
- Michael Atkinson (1991), inspector general of the Intelligence Community (2018–2020)
- Tyrone Brown (1967), commissioner of the Federal Communications Commission and consulting counsel at Wiley Rein LLP
- Oliver D. Burden (1897), United States attorney for the Northern District of New York 1923–1936
- George H. Cohen (1957), director of the Federal Mediation and Conciliation Service
- Philip Perry (1990), former general counsel of the United States Department of Homeland Security and former general counsel for the Office of Management and Budget
- Michael E. Toner (1992), former chair of the Federal Election Commission and chief counsel for the Republican National Committee

=== State government ===
==== Governors ====
- Philip H. Hoff (1951), 73rd governor of Vermont
- John T. Morrison (1890), 6th governor of Idaho
- Edmund Muskie (1939), 64th governor of Maine

==== State attorneys general ====
- Mark J. Bennett (1979), attorney general of Hawaii
- Thomas Carmody (1882), attorney general of New York
- Gordon MacDonald (1994), attorney general of New Hampshire
- Edward R. O'Malley (1891), attorney general of New York
- Peter N. Perretti Jr. (1956), attorney general of New Jersey
- William Sorrell (1974), attorney general of Vermont

==== State legislators ====
- Patrice Arent (1981), Utah House of Representatives and Utah State Senate
- David Bishop (1954), Minnesota House of Representatives
- Parley P. Christensen (1897), Utah House of Representatives and Los Angeles City Council
- James M. Coleman (1951), New Jersey General Assembly and judge in New Jersey Superior Court
- Constance E. Cook (1943), member of the New York State Assembly who in 1970 coauthored the first legislation that legalized abortion
- Dale Denno (1975), Maine House of Representatives and assistant attorney general of Maine
- Frances Kellor (1897), secretary and treasurer of the New York State Immigration Commission, chief investigator for the Bureau of Industries and Immigration of New York State, and chairman of the Women's Committee for the National Hughes Alliance
- Clarence D. Rappleyea Jr. (1962), minority leader of the New York State Assembly (1982–1995)

==== State judges ====
- Barry T. Albin (1976), associate justice of the Supreme Court of New Jersey (2002–present)
- William F. Bleakley (1904), justice of the New York Supreme Court
- Robert Boochever (1941), associate justice of the Supreme Court of Alaska (1972–1980), chief justice of the Supreme Court of Alaska 1975–1978
- Abraham S. Bordon (1914), justice of the Connecticut Supreme Court (1961)
- Albert M. Crampton (1922), justice of the Supreme Court of Illinois (1948–1953)
- Howard H. Dana Jr. (1966), associate justice of the Maine Supreme Judicial Court (1993–2007)
- Rowland L. Davis (1897), associate justice of the New York Supreme Court, Appellate Division, Fourth Department (1921–1926), Third Department (1926–1931), and Second Department (1931–1939)
- J. Michael Diaz (2002), judge of Washington Court of Appeals
- Marvin R. Dye (1917), associate judge of the New York Court of Appeals (1945–1965)
- Ellen Gorman (1982), associate justice of the Maine Supreme Judicial Court (2007–2022)
- Stewart F. Hancock Jr. (1950), associate judge of the New York Court of Appeals (1986–1993)
- Irving G. Hubbs (1891), associate judge of the New York Court of Appeals (1929–1939)
- Anthony T. Kane (1969), associate justice of the New York Supreme Court, Appellate Division, Third Department (2002–2009)
- Gordon MacDonald (1994), chief justice of the Supreme Court of New Hampshire (2021–present)
- Louis W. Marcus (1889), justice of the New York Supreme Court (1905–1923)
- Anne M. Patterson (1983), associate justice of the Supreme Court of New Jersey (2011–present)
- Cuthbert W. Pound (1887), associate judge of the New York Court of Appeals (1915–1934), chief judge of the New York Court of Appeals 1932–1934
- Phillip Rapoza (1976), chief justice of the Massachusetts Appeals Court (2006–2015), associate justice of the Massachusetts Appeals Court (1998–2006)
- Roberto A. Rivera-Soto (1977), associate justice of the Supreme Court of New Jersey (2004–2011)
- Burton B. Roberts (LLM 1953), justice of the New York Supreme Court, model for the character Myron Kovitsky in the book The Bonfire of the Vanities by Tom Wolfe
- Robert M. Sohngen (1908), justice of the Supreme Court of Ohio (1947–1948)
- Harry Taylor (1893), associate justice of the New York Supreme Court, Appellate Division, Fourth Department (1924–1936)
- Joseph Weintraub (1930), chief justice of the Supreme Court of New Jersey (1957–1973), associate justice of the Supreme Court of New Jersey (1956–1957)
- Richard C. Wesley (1974), associate judge of the New York Court of Appeals (1997–2003)
- Paul Yesawich (1951), associate justice of the New York Supreme Court, Appellate Division, First Department (1974–1981), Third Department (1981–1999)

==== City government ====
- Quinton Lucas (2009), 55th mayor of Kansas City, Missouri
- Thomas Richards (1972), 68th mayor of Rochester, New York

==== County government ====
- William F. Bleakley (1904), county executive of Westchester County
- Edwin L. Crawford (1950), Broome County, New York's first county executive and executive director of the New York State Association of Counties

=== Non-United States government ===
==== Non-United States political figures ====
- Kissi Agyebeng (LLM 2006), special prosecutor of Ghana
- Anna-Michelle Assimakopoulou (1991), member of the European Parliament for Greece
- Carlos Mendoza Davis (LLM 1995), governor of Baja California Sur (2015–2021)
- Anna Dolidze (JSD 2013), chief legal adviser to the President of Georgia, appointed to the High Council of Justice
- Juan Carlos Esguerra Portocarrero (LLM 1973), ambassador of Colombia to the United States and Colombian Minister of Justice and Law
- Huang Kuo-chang (JSD 2006), Taiwanese politician, activist, legal scholar, researcher, and writer
- Bajrakitiyabha Mahidol (LLM 2002, JSD 2005), princess of Thailand
- Kotaro Nagasaki (1994), member of the House of Representatives in the Diet of Japan
- Laxmi Mall Singhvi (JSD 1955), served as High Commissioner of India to the United Kingdom (1991–1997)
- Martín Travieso (1903), served as provisional governor of Puerto Rico, a member of the first Senate of Puerto Rico, mayor of San Juan
- Tsai Ing-wen (LLM 1980), first woman to serve as president of Taiwan (2016–2024)
- Jan van Zanen (LLM 1984), mayor of The Hague

==== Non-United States judicial figures ====
- Jillian Mallon (LLM 1993), judge of the Court of Appeal of New Zealand
- Akira Ojima (LLM 1990), associate justice of the Supreme Court of Japan
- Angel de Jesús Sánchez (1913), fifth chief justice of the Supreme Court of Puerto Rico
- Song Sang-Hyun (JSD 1970), judge of the International Criminal Court (2003–2015), president of the International Criminal Court 2009–2015
- Martín Travieso (1903), associate and chief justice of the Supreme Court of Puerto Rico

== Law ==
- Paul Batista (1974), trial lawyer and author of the leading treatise on civil RICO
- David Buckel (1987), LGBT rights lawyer who worked with Lambda Legal and The Legal Aid Society
- George B. Clementson (1892), first attorney to develop bicycle law as an area of practice within the law
- Jonathan Cuneo (1977), general and legislative counsel in the first case to challenge the Joe Camel cigarette advertising campaign and the case on behalf of defrauded Enron investors
- Mary H. Donlon (1920), first female editor-in-chief of a US law review; first female partner of a Wall Street law firm
- Milton S. Gould (1933), founding partner of Shea & Gould; namesake of Milton Gould Award for Outstanding Advocacy
- Gitanjali Gutierrez (2001), first lawyer to meet with a detainee at Guantanamo Bay, Information Commissioner for Bermuda
- Marc Kasowitz (1977), founding partner of Kasowitz Benson Torres
- Frances Kellor (1897), founding member of the American Arbitration Association and expert in international arbitration
- Ron Kuby (1983), criminal and civil rights lawyer, counsel on cases such as Texas v. Johnson
- Gail Laughlin (1898), first woman from Maine to practice law; founder of the National League for Women's Service
- William F. Lee (1976), intellectual property lawyer, co-managing partner of WilmerHale, first Asian-American to lead a major US law firm
- Samuel Leibowitz (1915), criminal and civil rights lawyer, represented The Scottsboro Boys and argued Norris v. Alabama; namesake of Samuel Leibowitz Professorship
- Leonard Leo (1989), conservative legal activist, co-chair of the board of the Federalist Society
- Harold O. Levy (1977), Executive Director of the Jack Kent Cooke Foundation and former Chancellor of New York City Schools
- Shannon Minter (1993), civil rights attorney, named one of the TIME 100 Most Influential People in the World (2026)
- Jan Schlichtmann (1977), environmental and toxic tort attorney, lead plaintiffs' lawyer in Anderson v. Cryovac, Inc., subject of the book A Civil Action by Jonathan Harr and the film of the same name, in which Schlichtmann was portrayed by John Travolta.
- Tejshree Thapa (1993), human rights attorney, developed legal argument for prosecuting rape as a crime against humanity before the ICTY
- Justin DuPratt White (1890), founding partner of White & Case; namesake of J. DuPratt White Professorship

== Literature and journalism ==
- Gordon G. Chang (1976), author, Forbes columnist, and partner at Baker McKenzie and Paul, Weiss, Rifkind, Wharton & Garrison
- Barry Eisler (1989), novelist
- Ari Melber (2009), journalist, chief legal correspondent for MSNBC, and host of The Beat with Ari Melber
- Michael Punke (1989), author of The Revenant: A Novel of Revenge, the basis of the film The Revenant

== Military ==
- George Bell Jr. (1894), United States Army major general who commanded the 33rd Infantry Division in World War I and later the United States VI Corps

== Sports ==
- Cameron Argetsinger (1954), auto racing executive best known for creating the Watkins Glen Grand Prix Race Course
- L. W. Boynton (1900), head football coach at the University of Kansas, Sewanee: The University of the South, and Washington University in St. Louis
- Joseph Cresci (1967), president of Ogden Recreation Inc who oversaw the operations Suffolk Downs, Scarborough Downs, Waterford Park, Fairmount Park, and Wheeling Downs; vice president and general manager of the Garden State Racing Association
- Bob DuPuy (1973), former president of Major League Baseball
- Hughie Jennings (no degree), member of the National Baseball Hall of Fame
- Teddy Mayer (1962), co-founder and manager of McLaren Racing
- Pablo Morales (1994), gold medalist at the 1992 Summer Olympics, and former world-record holder in the 100 metres butterfly
- Rick Olczyk (1996), assistant general manager of the Seattle Kraken
- Harry Taylor (1893), professional baseball player with the Louisville Colonels and the Baltimore Orioles
- Glenn Scobey Warner (1894), legendary football coach and innovator
- Paul Yesawich (1951), played in five NBA games for the Syracuse Nationals

== Fictional alumni ==
- Irene Menéndez Hastings, in The Secret in Their Eyes, received her law degree from Cornell.
- Norman Mushari, according to God Bless You, Mr. Rosewater, graduated "from Cornell Law School at the top of his class".
- Ling Woo, on Ally McBeal, was an editor of the Cornell Law Review.
