= David Haber =

American businessman

David Haber (1909–1983) was an American businessman.

Haber was born in 1909 in Harlem. He owned a large fleet of taxi cabs in New York City until 1963 when he sold them for $4 million.

In 1952 Haber purchased Miami radio station WFEC for $50,000. Haber filed for a construction permit for a television station on channel 10 the next year, but withdrew his bid for the channel later that year. Under Haber WFEC was primarily aimed at a Black audience, promoting itself as "the only station in Florida featuring all-negro programming" and aired shows hosted by Robert Earl Sawyer and King Coleman. In 1955, WFEC came under scrutiny by the FCC for airing programs hosted by "tipsters" claiming to help listeners bet on horse race winners. The station won its license renewals after removing the programs. Haber sold the station later in the year for $70,000.

Haber owned horses with his attorney and business associate Henry Friedlander and raced under the name of Dirf Stable. In 1959 he opened Shenandoah Downs in Charles Town, West Virginia. In 1964, Haber, who wanted to own a larger track as well as one closer to his home in Manhattan, purchased Suffolk Downs from John C. Pappas for $3 million. Haber planned a turning Suffolk from a mile-long thoroughbred into a harness track. In 1968 he sold Suffolk Downs to Reality Equities Corporation of New York. He was succeeded as track president by former baseball executive Bill Veeck but remained as chairman until Reality Equities sold the track in 1971.

Haber died on October 28, 1983. In 1992 the executor of Haber's $1.27 million estate Melvyn Altman was accused of stealing from three estates, including Haber's. Altman was sentenced to 41 months in prison for stealing $750,000 from Haber's estate and from the estate of a intellectually disabled man he had been given guardianship of.
