= Walter E. O'Hara =

American businessman (1897–1941)

Walter Edmund O'Hara (April 20, 1897 – February 28, 1941) was an American horse racing executive who was the first President and Managing Director of the Narragansett Racing Association, which owned and operated Narragansett Park, a Thoroughbred horse track in Pawtucket, Rhode Island.

== Early life ==
O'Hara was born on April 20, 1897, in Middleborough, Massachusetts. He attended public school there and then went to work for a newspaper in New Bedford, Massachusetts. He later moved to Fall River where he became involved in the textile industry. O'Hara made a fortune buying and selling textile machinery and factories. He gained control over a number of textile mills and controlled eleven corporations in Massachusetts, including Annawan Mills in Fall River.

In 1933, O'Hara was instrumental in bringing about an investigation of the Massachusetts State Police, which led to the resignation of Public Safety Commissioner Alfred F. Foote.

== Narragansett Park ==
After he made a fortune in the textile industry O'Hara decided to branch out into other fields. He considered purchasing the Polo Grounds and constructing a sliding roof so the New York Giants could play in bad weather. However, while on vacation in Florida, O'Hara became interested in horse racing. In 1934, the parimutuel wagering was legalized in Rhode Island and O'Hara, along with James Dooley and Archie W. Merchant, formed the Narragansett Racing Association. They purchased the What Cheer Airport in Pawtucket and constructed Narragansett Park at the cost of $1.2 million. Construction was completed in less than two months. O'Hara was chosen to serve as the track's first President and Managing Director.

After Narragansett Park opened, O'Hara tried to become friends with local politicians. He established an alliance with former state Budget Director Thomas P. McCoy who was a candidate for the Democratic nomination for Governor of Rhode Island in 1936. McCoy was defeated for the nomination by Lieutenant Governor Robert E. Quinn.

To further advance his interests, O'Hara purchased the Providence News-Tribune from Peter G. Gerry and merged it with another paper he purchased, the Pawtucket Star, to create the Providence Star-Tribune.

=== The Race Track War ===
In the summer of 1937, O'Hara got into an altercation with the state racing steward. The state Horse Racing Division ordered that O'Hara be removed as a track official of the race track for intimidating and interfering with the steward. A Superior Court judge issued a restraining order which temporarily set aside the division's ruling. Attorney General of Rhode Island John Patrick Hartigan then got the restraining order set aside by the court's presiding judge. The Horse Racing Division also ordered an audit of the Narragansett Racing Association's books, which resulted in six new charges against the track to revoke its license the fall racing season. O'Hara responded to the charges in the Star-Tribune in an article which he implied that Governor Quinn was or would end up in Butler Hospital, a psychiatric hospital that specialized in the treatment of substance abuse. Quinn eventually pursued criminal libel charges against O'Hara. O'Hara was arrested by state police at his penthouse at Narragansett Park. He was quickly released on bail.

On September 15, 1937, the Rhode Island Supreme Court unanimously decided to quash the division's order to remove O'Hara. However, Quinn filed two charges with the division seeking O'Hara's removal as a track official and the revocation of the Narragansett Racing Association's license for O'Hara's attacks in the newspaper. The division sided with the Governor and ordered O'Hara's removal and indefinitely suspended the track's license at the end of the summer races. The summer racing season ended on September 30, 1937, however, the track did not remove O'Hara. The Supreme Court quashed the division's order to remove O'Hara and suspend the track's license. However, Quinn refused to permit racing at the track. On October 17, Quinn declared that Narragansett Park was "in a state of insurrection," and ordered the National Guard to enforce martial law. O'Hara, who was in Maryland on business, flew back to the track and was escorted by guardsmen to his penthouse on the track's roof, where he entertained journalists and politicians. He also played March of the Wooden Soldiers over the public address system for the guardsmen.

At 1 a.m on October 27, O'Hara was arrested in another libel suit by Quinn. As no judge was available to receive bail at that time, deputy sheriffs guarded O'Hara all night in a room at the Providence Biltmore. O'Hara was freed on $7,500 bail in the morning. Quinn eventually decided discontinue the suit on April 26, 1938.

On November 30, 1937, O'Hara petitioned the Superior Court for a temporary receiver of The Star Tribune, stating that he had "lost hundreds of thousands fighting for right". At the time, the federal government had placed liens on his and his wife's properties for unpaid income tax. The paper was later purchased by the Providence Journal at auction. The Journal had its printers destroy the Star-Tribune′s presses with sledgehammers, thereby eliminating its biggest competitor.

On February 9, 1938, sheriff's deputies battered down the Narragansett Racing Association' doors and seized records on order of Superior Court. O'Hara then resigned as the association's president and managing director. He was succeeded by James Dooley.

In 1938, O'Hara ran for Governor and came in third. O'Hara received 12,696 votes as the Square Deal party's candidate in a race that was won by Republican William Henry Vanderbilt III. Quinn (2nd place) had been hurt by the "Race Track War", as the $100,000 it cost the state to maintain the presence of the National Guard at the track and the lost revenue from the track's closure became campaign issues.

In 1939, O'Hara sold his shares in Narragansett Park to James H. Connors.

== Other business ventures ==
In 1934, O'Hara was a founding director of the Boston Garden-Arena Corporation.

In 1935, he entered the public utilities business by forming the Pawtucket Light and Power Co. He based the company out of an abandoned textile mill, which had a suitable enough power plant and room for expansion. In 1936 the City of Pawtucket purchased the mill for $55,000 cash and a $35,000 tax abatement.

O'Hara held options on the site of Benning Race Track in Washington, D.C., and was prepared to build another race course there if parimutuel wagering was legalized in the district.

In 1940, O'Hara announced plans to build a $2,000,000 (~$35 million in 2024) race track near Atlantic City, New Jersey. However, plans fell through and the track was never built.

=== Suffolk Downs ===
O'Hara was also the first managing director of Suffolk Downs. However, he left before the track opened because he felt the East Boston site was not suitable for a race track. He believed that the Sumner Tunnel was inadequate to handle the amount of traffic the track would receive, its location near oil tanks posed a possible fire hazard, and the purchase price of the land was too high.

In 1936, O'Hara made an offer to Charles Adams, Weston Adams, and Bruce Wetmore to purchase controlling interest of Suffolk Downs for $500,000 (~$8.86 million in 2024). His bid was rejected.

== Personal life ==
On June 24, 1918, O'Hara married Helen B. Langshaw of New Bedford. The marriage ended in divorce nine years later. His second marriage to Cle Maddigan ended in divorce in January 1939. On June 15, 1940, he married Rose C. McLaughlin of Providence, Rhode Island. They separated on September 21, 1940.

== Death ==
On February 28, 1941, O'Hara was driving on the Providence-Taunton Highway to his office in Pawtucket. In Taunton, Massachusetts, O'Hara's car suddenly swerved into the other lane and crashed into an oncoming car. O'Hara was pronounced dead at Morton Hospital.

After his death, a legal battle ensued as to whom was entitled to ownership of O'Hara's two life insurance policies worth $80,000. During the proceedings, O'Hara was depicted as someone who would fly into a rage when drunk. On Christmas Eve 1940 he smashed a picture frame over his wife's head during an argument between the two of them in which his wife was said to have hit him in the eye with a gun. The policies were awarded to O'Hara's estate, as Mrs. O'Hara had surrendered the policies when she and her husband separated and he had the right to change the beneficiary to his estate.

Preceded by First	President of Narragansett Park; 1934–38	Succeeded by James Dooley
Preceded by First	Managing Director of Suffolk Downs; 1935–35	Succeeded by Allan J. Wilson
