= Allan J. Wilson =

Horse racing executive

Allan James Wilson (February 16, 1886 – October 27, 1963) was a Canadian-born American horse racing executive.

== Early life ==
Wilson was born on February 16, 1886, in Charlottetown, Prince Edward Island. He spent the first eleven years of his life on his family's farm in Charlottetown, where he began his work with horses. Before he reached his teens, Wilson's family moved to an apartment in Boston.

== Business ==
Due to his family's economic circumstances, Wilson had to stop attending school after eight grade to take a job as a messenger boy at the Frost Forwarding Company. However, he was able to complete a three-year night school course in business at a local high school. After two or three years with the company, Wilson had moved up to the position of head clerk. While still in his teens he became foreman and assistant superintendent. When Wilson was 21, the firm's superintendent died and Wilson was chosen to succeed him. Three years later, Wilson joined the A. Towle Company, a larger competitor of Frost Forwarding, as an equal partner.

== Jockey ==
Wilson was one of the top amateur harness racing drivers in the United States. He competed in Grand Circuit races in Avon, Connecticut, Goshen, New York, and Syracuse, New York.

== Track executive ==
Wilson began his career as a track executive in 1917 as the owner and operator of Sage Park, a harness track in Windsor, Connecticut. Wilson turned the run-down track into one of the showplaces of harness racing in the 1920s. He created area's first $5,000 and $10,000 stake events for two- and three-year-olds as well as a $10,000 stakes for aged horses. Wilson's races attracted horsemen from as far away as St. Louis and Milwaukee. In July 1928 Wilson held a $25,000 Pacing Derby, which was won by Canadian Horse Racing Hall of Fame horse Grattan Bars.

On January 12, 1921, Wilson was elected president of the Short Ship Circuit, a harness racing chain. From 1929 to 1935 he was president of the Bay State Light Harness Circuit.

In 1932 Wilson played an instrumental role in bringing the Grand Circuit back to Rockingham Park. He served as manager of the meet, which was sponsored by the Boston Garden Corporation in connection with its New England States Fair. It was the first Grand Circuit meet at Rockingham since 1913. In 1933 he secured the rights to host The National and The Great American Stakes, two tune-up races for the Hambletonian Stakes, for Rockingham Park.

On January 12, 1935, Wilson was elected vice president of Eastern Racing Association, Inc., a corporation formed to open the Suffolk Downs thoroughbred race track in East Boston. Six months later he was given the additional duty of managing director. He retained this post until it was abolished in December 1936.

In 1939, Wilson was one of the financial backers of a proposed horse track in Natick, Massachusetts.

In 1945, Wilson returned to Suffolk Downs as president and general manager. He remained in the position after the track was sold to a group led by John C. Pappas in 1946. On April 17, 1948, Wilson resigned as president and general manager. He was asked to stay on as chairman of the board, but declined because he wanted to cut down on his business and racing responsibilities.

In 1950, Wilson was named vice president and general manager of Scarborough Downs. He was succeeded by Sidney M. Goldfine after the track's first season.

== Stable owner ==
Wilson owned a horse stable based in Newton, Massachusetts. His son, Allan Jr. was one of his drivers.

== Death ==
Wilson died on October 27, 1963, in Dover, Massachusetts.

Preceded by Walter E. O'Hara	Managing Director of Suffolk Downs; 1935–36	Succeeded by Position abolished
Preceded by Gordon B. Hanlon	President of Suffolk Downs; 1945–48	Succeeded by John C. Pappas
Preceded by First	General Director of Scarborough Downs; 1950–50	Succeeded by Sidney M. Goldfine
