= Errol Sawyer =

American photographer (1943–2020)

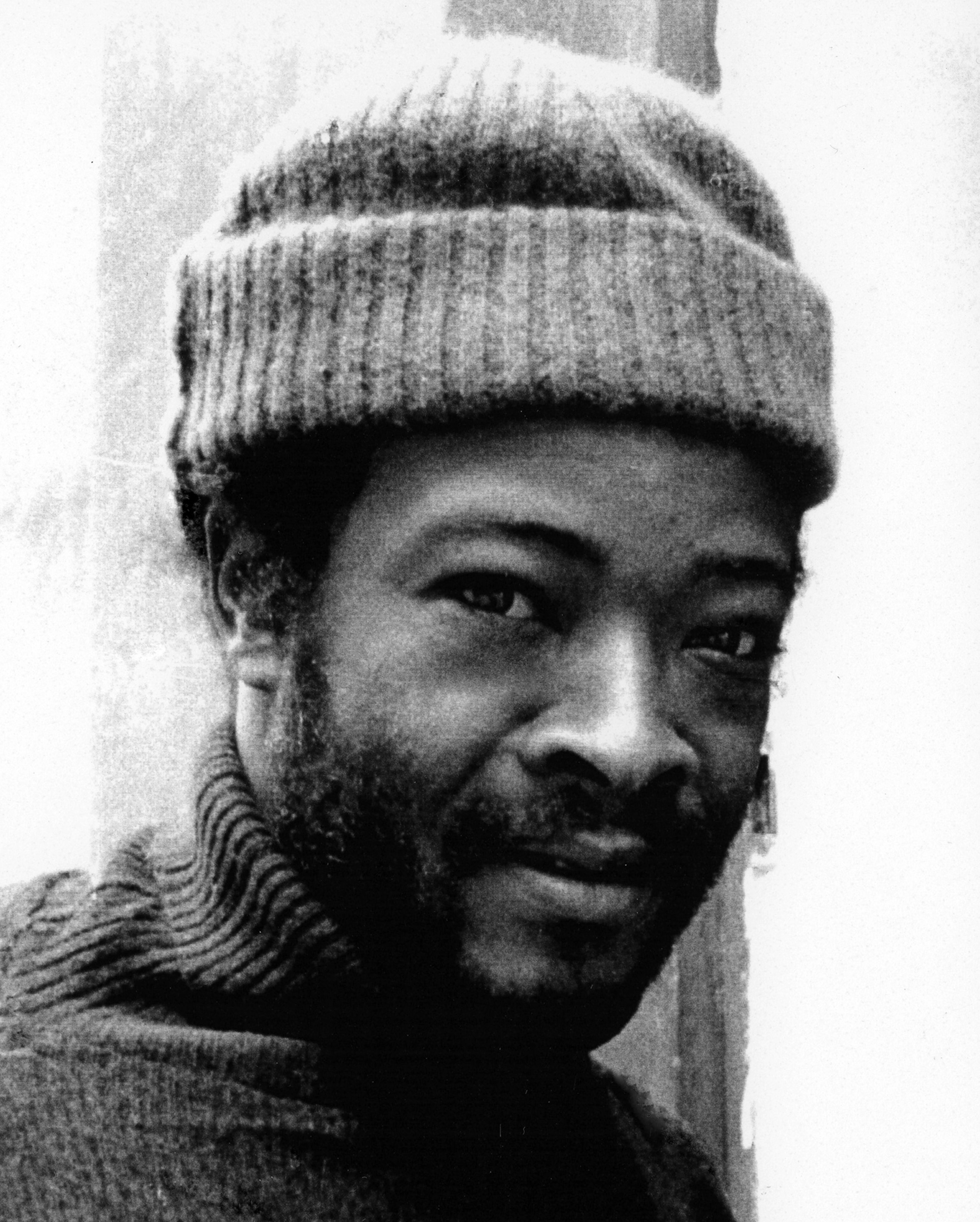
- Sawyer in Paris, 1973.
- Born: Errol Stanley Sawyer; August 8, 1943; Miami, Florida, U.S.
- Died: December 24, 2020 (aged 77); Amsterdam, Netherlands
- Known for: Photography
- Movement: Street photography
- Spouse: Mathilde Fischer
- Children: Victor Leonard Sawyer
- Website: www.errolsawyer.org

Errol Stanley Sawyer (August 8, 1943 – December 24, 2020) was an American photographer who lived and worked the last twenty two years of his life in Amsterdam, the Netherlands.

== Early life ==
Sawyer was born in Miami, Florida, to parents Robert Earl Sawyer (1923–94) and Mamie Lucille Donaldson (1928–2009). His father was an African American playwright, actor, director and producer whose family emigrated from Nassau, Bahamas, to Miami. His mother, an African American-Cherokee Indian originally from Bainbridge, Georgia, was head of the Intensive Care Unit of the Bronx-Lebanon Hospital Center in The Bronx, New York City, for 25 years. She had a passion for theatre.

In 1950, Sawyer moved with his mother and sister Wanda from Miami to Harlem, New York City, and three years later to The Bronx. In 1961, he graduated from James Monroe High School. From 1962 to 1966, he studied history and political science at New York University. Nearby Greenwich Village exposed him to another world of art and culture, and to chess, which has remained a passion for him. According to Sawyer, the Woodstock Festival, in 1969, had a big impact on his career path. In the 1960s, he was a regular at Mickey Ruskin's club Max's Kansas City, where he met Jimi Hendrix, Robert Rauschenberg, Larry Rivers, Claes Oldenburg, Andy Warhol, and Diane Arbus. Arbus would later make a portrait of him in her studio.

== Career ==
In 1968, Sawyer found his vocation as a photographer while traveling in Colombia, Ecuador, and Peru. His first camera was a Kowa. His first professional job came in 1971 in London. Sawyer has cited photographers James Moore, Bill Silano, Richard Avedon, and Gosta Peterson as influences.

In the early 1970s, Sawyer lived and worked in Paris and London. His photographs were published in magazines such as Dépêche Mode, Elle, and French Vogue. He photographed the African-American painter Beauford Delaney and the American actresses Patti D'Arbanville, Jessica Lange, and Maria Schneider in Paris. In 1973, he discovered the American model Christie Brinkley, took her first modeling photos and convinced John Casablancas to accept her at Elite Model Management in Paris.

In 1978, Sawyer returned to New York and worked for magazines such as New York Magazine, Working Women and US Vogue. He did beauty campaigns for Avon, Germaine Monteil and Max Factor. At the same time he continued his street photography.

Since 1984, Sawyer has worked on commercial assignments and has done multicultural beauty projects for L'Oréal and Vis-A-Vis Magazine. However, most of his time is spent on documentary and fine art photography, primarily black and white photographs in the streets of New York, Paris, and Amsterdam. His fine art pictures have been published in The Sun, ZoneZero of Pedro Meyer, PF Magazine, and Filosofie Magazine in the Netherlands.

From 2006 until 2010, Sawyer was a guest professor of photography at Technical University Delft in the Netherlands.

In 2010, his photo book City Mosaic was published. The book contains 64 black & white images divided into three chapters: "Graffiti," "Portraits & City Scenes" and "Perspectives." Writing the book's introduction, photography critic A. D. Coleman describes the work as "close to four decades worth of engagement with the classic mode of mainstream-modernist street photography. Consistent in quality, in terms of both craft and content, it speaks in its own voice, aware of the tradition on which it builds but not noticeably beholden to any predecessor therein."

== Style ==
According to Sawyer, "a picture is good when it leaves room for you to imagine." He aims to provoke the viewer to look more closely at everyday situations that may otherwise be overlooked. He photographs people, graffiti, and perspectives in public and semi-public space, such as parks, streets, and underground stations.

Writing for PF Magazine, critic Herman Hoeneveld remarked "Errol Sawyer could be justifiably called a cultural philosopher who seems to press for consciousness and contemplation. He calls on our common sense to not allow our feelings to be crushed by the unbridled rush for consumption."

Art critic and former museum director Julian Spalding described Sawyer as "a classical black and white photographer in the Henri Cartier-Bresson tradition, using the camera at its simplest and most challenging, as a trap for catching time." Writing for the World Socialist Web Site, painter Richard Phillips remarked "Errol Sawyer is a rare figure in contemporary photography: someone who worked in the often faddish and superficial world of high-end commercial photography but still retains his artistic integrity and creative spirit."

== Personal life and death ==
Sawyer was married to the architect Mathilde Fischer.

Sawyer died on December 24, 2020, at age 77.

== Exhibitions ==
Sawyer has held solo exhibitions at:

- 4th Street Gallery, New York City, 1989. Theme: Children of East End.
- Royal Photographic Society, Bath, England, 1992. Theme: Children of East End.
- La Musée de la Photographie, Bièvre, France, 1993. Theme: Paris.
- Foto Huset Gallery, Götenburg, Sweden, 1993. Theme: Graffiti.
- No Name Gallery, Basel, Switzerland, 1993. Theme: Graffiti.
- La Chambre Claire Gallery, Paris, France, 2000. Theme: City Mosaïc.
- Town Hall, Amsterdam, Netherlands, 2010. Theme: Diofior, A Village in Senegal.

== Collections ==
- La Bibliothèque Nationale, Paris, France, 1974 and 2001. 37 pictures.
- La Musée de la Photographie, Bièvre, France, 1991. 6 pictures.
- Schomburg Center for Research in Black Culture, Harlem, New York, 1997. 40 pictures.
- Eric Franck Gallery, London, England, 1997. 21 pictures.
- Fadi Zahar, La Chambre Claire Gallery, Paris, France, 2000. 4 pictures.
- Manfred Heiting, Amsterdam, Holland, 2002. 2 pictures.
- Museum of Fine Arts, Houston, Texas, 2004. 2 pictures.
- Victoria & Albert Museum, London. England. Work added to National Art Library Collection, 2005.
- Tate Britain, London, England, 2012. 21 pictures.
