= James H. Connors =

American horse racing executive and businessman

James H. Connors was an American horse racing executive and businessman who served as president of Suffolk Downs.

== Early life ==
Connors was born and raised in Boston's Roxbury neighborhood. He attended St. John's School and Roxbury High School.

== Business ==
Connors became a prominent businessman in Boston through his work in the linen industry. He served as president of the Federal National Linen Service and the National Coat and Apron Manufacturing Company. He also served as a director of the Union Savings Bank of Boston.

== Horse racing ==
In April 1937, Connors became a shareholder of the Eastern Racing Association, owners of Suffolk Downs, and was elected first vice president. That December he was elected president after Charles Adams decided to give up the position to focus on his other interests. Adams, who remained as the chairman of the board, would later state that Connors was elected at the behest of Governor Charles F. Hurley.

In 1939, Connors resigned as Suffolk Downs president amid allegations that he, his brother-in-law (State Racing Commissioner Thomas R. Foley), and Outdoor Amusements, Inc. (a company applying for a license to open a track in Westport, Massachusetts) attempted to gain control of horse racing in eastern Massachusetts. According to the Eastern Racing Association, Foley secretly worked to acquire a license for Outdoor Amusements, Inc. Meanwhile, Connors demanded that Adams and Bruce Wetmore sell him their shares of Suffolk Downs or they would not get any favorable racing dates. Connors denied he had any involvement with Outdoor Amusements and stated that he left Suffolk Downs because he objected to the racing secretary's exorbitant salary as well as the graft and thievery at the track. The racing commission voted to revoke Outdoor Amusements' license due to misleading information in their application, but found that there was not enough evidence to establish a conspiracy between Outdoor Amusements, Connors, and Foley.

Later that year, Connors bought extensively into the Narragansett Park, including the shares of track founder Walter E. O'Hara. In 1940 he was elected chairman of the Narragansett Racing Association, a position he held until his death. His brother Charles A. Connors succeeded him as chairman.

In addition to serving as a track executive, Connors also maintained the Gaeta Irrian Farm racing stable in Meredith, New Hampshire, and kept show horses on his farm in Alton Bay, New Hampshire.

== Politics ==
Connors was an active member of the Democratic Party. In 1934, President Franklin D. Roosevelt named Connors as the industrial member of the New England Labor Relations Board. In 1938 he chaired a large testimonial dinner for Postmaster James A. Farley at the Copley Plaza Hotel.

== Death ==
Connors died on July 11, 1941, at his home in Newton, Massachusetts. The cause of death was Coronary thrombosis. Narragansett Park's Old Colony Stakes was renamed the James H. Connors Memorial Stakes in his honor.

Preceded by Charles Adams	President of Suffolk Downs; 1937–39	Succeeded by Charles Adams
Preceded by Morgan Belmont	Chairman of Narragansett Park; 1940–41	Succeeded by Charles A. Connors
