= Robert Sawyer =

Robert Sawyer may refer to:

People

- Sir Robert Sawyer (Attorney General) (1633–1692), Attorney General for England and Wales and Speaker of the English House of Commons
- Robert J. Sawyer (born 1960), Canadian science fiction writer
- Robert William Sawyer (1880–1959), Oregon politician and conservationist
- Robert Sawyer (murderer) (died 1993), murderer executed in Louisiana
- Robert Earl Sawyer (1923–1994), African-American playwright, director and actor
- Robert Sawyer (American football) (born 1962), American football punter
- R. Tom Sawyer (1901–1986), inventor of the gas turbine locomotive
- Bob Sawyer, Iron Maiden band member

Fictional characters

- Chop Top, real name "Robert Sawyer", a villain from The Texas Chainsaw Massacre franchise
