= Tomasello =

Tomasello can refer to:

- Joseph A. Tomasello (1883–1936), an American contractor.
- Michael Tomasello (born 1950), an American developmental psychologist and linguist.
- Tomasello Winery, a winery located in New Jersey, United States.
