= Lorraine Hanlon =

American figure skater

Personal information
- Full name: Lorraine Hanlon
- Born: 1946 (age 79–80)

Figure skating career
- Country: United States
- Coach: Cecilia Colledge Karl Schäfer
- Skating club: SC of Boston
- Retired: 1964

Lorraine Hanlon Comanor (born 1946) is an American retired figure skater who competed in ladies singles. She is the 1963 U.S. national champion. After retiring from ice skating, Hanlon went on to attend medical school and practiced as an anesthesiologist for 20 years before going into pharmaceutical medicine. She is board certified in anesthesia.

== Early life ==
Hanlon was born in 1946 in Boston, Massachusetts to stockbroker Gordon B. Hanlon and artist and Harvard art historian Marguerite Pote Hanlon. As a child, she suffered from severe asthma and began skating after her mother took her to an ice rink to get away from pollen.

== Career ==
She won the junior title at the 1961 United States Figure Skating Championships. She was invited to participate in an exhibition following that year's World Figure Skating Championships but declined because her school would not allow her to go. That decision proved fateful, as the flight she would have been on (Sabena Flight 548) crashed near Brussels, Belgium, killing all on board.

Hanlon won the silver medal at the 1962 U.S. Championships and the gold at the 1963 U.S. Championships. However, she retired prior to the 1964 Winter Olympics.

Hanlon was a graduate of the Winsor School in Boston, and was attending the Swiss Alpine College in Switzerland the same year she won her U.S. title. She had previously spent summers training in Europe and spoke fluent French and German. She retired after the 1963 World Championship, but was later persuaded to return to skating while attending Jackson College of Tufts University, but finished 4th at the U.S. Championships and therefore failed to qualify for the 1964 Winter Olympics. She then transferred to Harvard University, graduating in 1968, having already started medical school.

== Results ==
Event	1960	1961	1962	1963	1964
World Championships			10th	10th	
U.S. Championships	4th J.	1st J.	2nd	1st	4th

- J = Junior level

== Career in medicine ==
Hanlon attended Winsor School in Boston before attending Harvard University in Cambridge, Massachusetts. She graduated from Harvard in 1968 and continued on to the Stanford University School of Medicine in California. She was one of six women in her class of 60 at the Stanford University School of Medicine.

She completed an internship in pediatrics at San Francisco Children's Hospital and her residency at Stanford University Hospital and the Peter Bent Brigham Hospital, Harvard University in anesthesia. She then spent a year traveling before settling down in the San Francisco Bay area in 1974, where she practiced anesthesia for 20 years.

She did an internship in pediatrics at San Francisco Children's Hospital and a residency in anesthesia at Stanford University Hospital. After a year in England and Japan, she moved to the San Francisco Bay area in 1974, and practiced anesthesia there for the next twenty years.

In 1994, Hanlon switched from clinical practice to research and began to work in the pharmaceutical industry, first at Syntex, then Chiron, Bayer HealthCare, and Novartis in the department of scientific affairs for nucleic acid diagnostics. There, she helped coordinate and design Bayer's United States and Canadian hepatitis studies. She became a medical writer, writing up her own studies and those of others. In 2013, she received a MFA in writing and literature from the Bennington Writing Seminars.
