= Gordon B. Hanlon =

American businessman

Gordon B. Hanlon (died 1973) was an American stockbroker from Boston.

== Early life ==
Hanlon was born in Boston, Massachusetts. He graduated from Suffolk Law School and Harvard Business School. He broke his leg skiing which kept him out of active military service during World War II.

== Business career ==
Hanlon was proprietor and owner of Gordon B. Hanlon & Company, a securities broker dealer. On October 1, 1941, he purchased controlling interest of the Aldred Investment Trust at a public auction.

=== Suffolk Downs ===
On February 20, 1944, the Aldred Investment Trust purchased a majority of the voting stock in Eastern Racing Association, Inc, which operated Suffolk Downs. Hanlon was elected president of the Eastern Racing Association that same day. Hanlon purchased the track strictly for business reasons, not because he was interested in the sport.

On May 19, 1944, the U.S. Securities and Exchange Commission announced that it had filed a complaint in federal court accusing Hanlon his fellow directors of the Aldred Investment Trust of gross abuse of the trust, including drastically changing the investment policy of the trust without giving adequate notice to security holders by purchasing stock in the Eastern Racing Association, keeping the trust insolvent since 1937, operating at a loss since 1939, and paying the directors large salaries. It asked the court to appoint a receiver to liquidate the trust's assets and distribute them to creditors. On January 19, 1945, Judge George Clinton Sweeney found Hanlon and five other Aldred officials guilty of gross abuse of the trust. On April 24, 1945, the Eastern Racing Association elected Allan J. Wilson to succeed Hanlon as track president, although he had not exercised any power since the receivers took over the trust. The track was sold to a group led by John C. Pappas at a public auction on May 1, 1946.

=== Bannwart estate ===
Hanlon served as the executor of the estate of Emilie T. Bannwart. Hanlon was to receive the bulk of the will after the death of Bannwart's brother. The will was contested by another brother, Alexander Bannwart, and the Community Church of Boston, who were disinherited. The parties reached an agreement in which Hanlon received $19,500 outright and was removed as executor.

== Personal life and death ==
Hanlon was married to artist and Harvard art historian Marguerite Pote Hanlon. Their daughter was figure skater Lorraine Hanlon.

Hanlon died on November 15, 1973, at his home in Boston.

Preceded by Charles Adams	President of Suffolk Downs; 1944–45	Succeeded by Allan J. Wilson
