= Joseph Cresci =

Joseph E. Cresci is an American businessman who is the founder and chairman of Environmental Power Corporation. In 1972 he was appointed president of Ogden Recreation Inc., where he oversaw the operations of five race tracks, including Suffolk Downs, Scarborough Downs, Waterford Park, Fairmount Park, and Wheeling Downs.

== Early life and career ==
A native of Vineland, New Jersey, Cresci graduated from Princeton University and Cornell Law School. He practiced law in Philadelphia, Pennsylvania before joining Garden State Racing Association as vice president and general manager in 1969. In 1972 he was appointed president of Ogden Recreation Inc., where he oversaw the operations of five race tracks (Suffolk Downs, Scarborough Downs, Waterford Park, Fairmount Park, and Wheeling Downs). In 1976 he became the CEO of G. E. Stimpson Company and Stimpson Systems, distributors of commercial office supplies and printing products.

== Environmental Power Corporation ==
After Stimpson was sold in 1982, Cresci founded Cresci Associates, an alternative energy business, with Donald Livingston. In 1986 the company was reincorporated in Delaware as Environmental Power Corporation. The following year Environmental Power went public with a $7 million initial public offering. EPC's projects have included a hydroelectric facilities in Dover-Foxcroft, Maine, Quechee, Vermont, and Hartford, Vermont, two waste-to-energy facilities in Texas, and a waste-coal power generation facility in Scrubgrass, Pennsylvania. It also held a minority stake in a coal-fired plant in Sunnyside, Utah. In 1991, Livingston took over the offices of president and chief operating officer, but Cresci remained chairman and chief executive officer. In 2003 Kam Tejwani succeeded Cresci as CEO and Livingston as president, with Cresci remaining on as chairman of the board of directors and of the executive management committee.
