= Bruce Wetmore =

American businessman

- Born: Valentine Cecil Bruce Wetmore; December 20, 1875; Gagetown, New Brunswick, Canada
- Died: April 11, 1953 (aged 77); Boston, Massachusetts
- Occupation: Businessman
- Known for: President of Wetmore-Savage company and part owner of the Boston Braves
- Children: 3

Valentine Cecil Bruce Wetmore (1875–1953) was an American businessman who founded an electrical supply business and was associated with sports promotor Charles Adams in operating Suffolk Downs and the Boston Braves.

== Business career ==
Wetmore was born on December 20, 1875, in Gagetown, New Brunswick. He moved to Boston in 1890. In 1906 he founded the Wetmore-Savage Company, an electrical supply business, with Hanson M. Savage. In 1918 the company went into the automotive equipment business following its purchase of the Motor Car Equipment Co. Wetmore-Savage was the New England distributor for Westinghouse, Gould, Holophane, and the Auburn Rubber Company.

In 1925, Westinghouse purchased the Wetmore-Savage Electric Supply Company, but not its automotive equipment business. Wetmore remained president of Wetmore-Savage following the sale.

In 1931, Wetmore and John W. Scott started the Wetmore-Scott Company to sell Westinghouse household appliances in Greater Boston. In 1933, Wetmore-Scott was sold to Westinghouse. Wetmore later served as Westinghouse's New England manager.

== Sports ==
In 1927, Wetmore, along with Charles Adams and Charles H. Farnsworth purchased shares in the Boston Braves from Albert H. Powell. At the time he invested in the club, Wetmore was not a baseball fan. He eventually succeeded longtime team treasurer Albert M. Lyon and was credited with installing "businesslike and economical reforms" by majority owner Emil Fuchs.

Adams and Wetmore were also the main financial backers of Suffolk Downs. Wetmore served as the inaugural treasurer of Eastern Racing Association, the corporation that owned Suffolk Downs. Baseball Commissioner Kenesaw Mountain Landis did not want any ties between baseball and horse racing and on December 31, 1935, Adams, Wetmore, and the other shareholders of the Boston National League Baseball Company voted to dissolve the corporation and allow Bob Quinn to take over the franchise. Wetmore stated that he took "a $75,000 bath in the old Braves investment".

On February 19, 1944, Wetmore and Adams sold controlling interest in the Eastern Racing Association to a group headed by Gordon B. Hanlon. Wetmore left the ERA on March 5, 1945, citing ill health. Wetmore also owned a horse racing stable and was a yacht racer.

== Personal life and death ==
In 1920, Wetmore was an alleged target of extortion by Daniel H. Coakley and William J. Corcoran. According to Wetmore's attorney, David Stoneman, Corcoran accused Wetmore of defrauding his first wife in their divorce and told Stoneman that if Wetmore did not pay $100,000 to have the case settled, Coakley would arrange to have Suffolk County District Attorney Joseph C. Pelletier present the case to a grand jury. Wetmore refused to pay and Wetmore and Stoneman were called to testify during Coakley and Corcoran's 1924 extortion trial.

Wetmore died on April 11, 1953, at Faulkner Hospital. He was survived by his wife and three children.
