= Pedro Meyer =

Spanish-born Mexican photographer (born 1935)

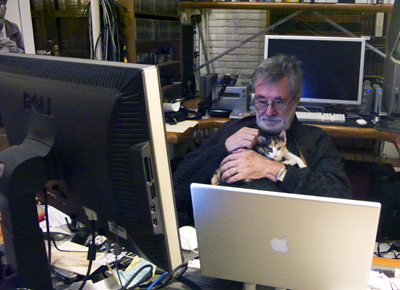
Pedro Meyer

Pedro Meyer (born October 6, 1935, in Madrid, Spain) is a Spanish-born Mexican photographer living in Mexico City. He was an early adopter of digital photography. He was the founder and president of the Consejo Mexicano de Fotografía (Mexican Council of Photography) and organizer of the first three Latin American Photography Colloquiums.

== Career ==
Besides his artistic photographic work, Meyer has been a teacher in various institutions, as well as the curator, editor, founder and director of the photography ZoneZero website, which hosts the work of over a thousand photographers from all over the world, and is visited by more than 500,000 people each month. More than 5.5 million people visited ZoneZero in one year.

Meyer has been a guest artist in the University of Colorado Boulder, Centro de Estudios Fotográficos in Vigo, Spain and The Arizona Western College in Yuma, Arizona. Meyer's ouvre has been the object of academic studies.

He is also the founder and chairman of the Pedro Meyer Foundation. In 2008, a retrospective exhibition named Heresies opened in 100 museums worldwide during the week of October 6, 2008.

== Awards ==
He was awarded the Guggenheim Fellowship in 1987, the Internazionale di Cultura Citta di Anghiari in 1985, in 1993 he received the National Endowment for the Arts in conjunction with Jonathan Green and the California Museum of Photography in Riverside. He has also received numerous awards in Mexican Photography Biennales and the very first grant destined to a Web project, awarded by the Rockefeller Foundation. In 1995, Meyer was selected by Time magazine as one of the best Mexican photographers.

== Publications ==
In 1991, he published I Photograph to Remember, one of the first CD ROMs in the world to combine images and sound. He is the author of the books Tiempos de América (American Times), Espejo de Espinas (Mirror of Thorns), Los Cohetes duraron todo el día (The Fireworks Lasted All Day). His book Truths and Fictions: A journey of documentary photography to digital was made into a CD ROM by Voyager in 1995. His latest book, titled The Real and the True, published by Peachpit Press, came out in 2005. In 2007, his work and contribution to the field of photography was honored via a special Mentor issue of Nueva Luz photographic journal (published by En Foco), guest edited by curator Elizabeth Ferrer.
