= Paul Yesawich =

American basketball player, attorney, and judge

Personal information
- Born: November 27, 1923 New York City, New York, U.S.
- Died: December 13, 2017 (aged 94)
- Listed height: 6 ft 2 in (1.88 m)
- Listed weight: 190 lb (86 kg)

Career information
- High school: Brooklyn Tech (Brooklyn, New York)
- College: Niagara (1941–1943, 1946–1948)
- NBA draft: 1948: undrafted
- Position: Forward

Career history
- 1948: Syracuse Nationals
- Stats at Basketball Reference

Paul Joseph Yesawich Jr. (November 27, 1923 – December 13, 2017) was an American basketball player who played in the United States' National Basketball League in five games for the Syracuse Nationals. Yesawich was also a New York attorney, legal scholar and judge, serving as a justice of the Appellate Division of the New York State Supreme Court, First Judicial Department from 1974 to 1981.
