= ZoneZero =

Photography website, founded in 1994

- Website type: Website dedicated to photography
- Available in: (in English) (in Spanish)
- Creator: Pedro Meyer
- Website: zonezero.com
- Commercial: no
- Registration: Free
- Launched: 1994 (32 years ago)
- Current status: Active

ZoneZero is a website dedicated to photography, founded in 1994 by Mexican photographer Pedro Meyer.

It first appeared online when the internet became a public resource, making it the oldest still-standing and growing website dedicated to photography. Robert Hirsch has referred to it as a "top-notch" photographic site.

The site is bilingual in English and Spanish and free of charge. It has a curated gallery space with portfolios and slide shows of featured photographers. Anyone meeting certain requirements can submit up to five images to the portfolio. The site also includes a magazine, a monthly editorial written by foundation staff and the founder, moblogs, e-books for download, and a forum.

== See also ==
- List of image-sharing websites
