= Suffolk Downs =

Former race track in East Boston, Massachusetts

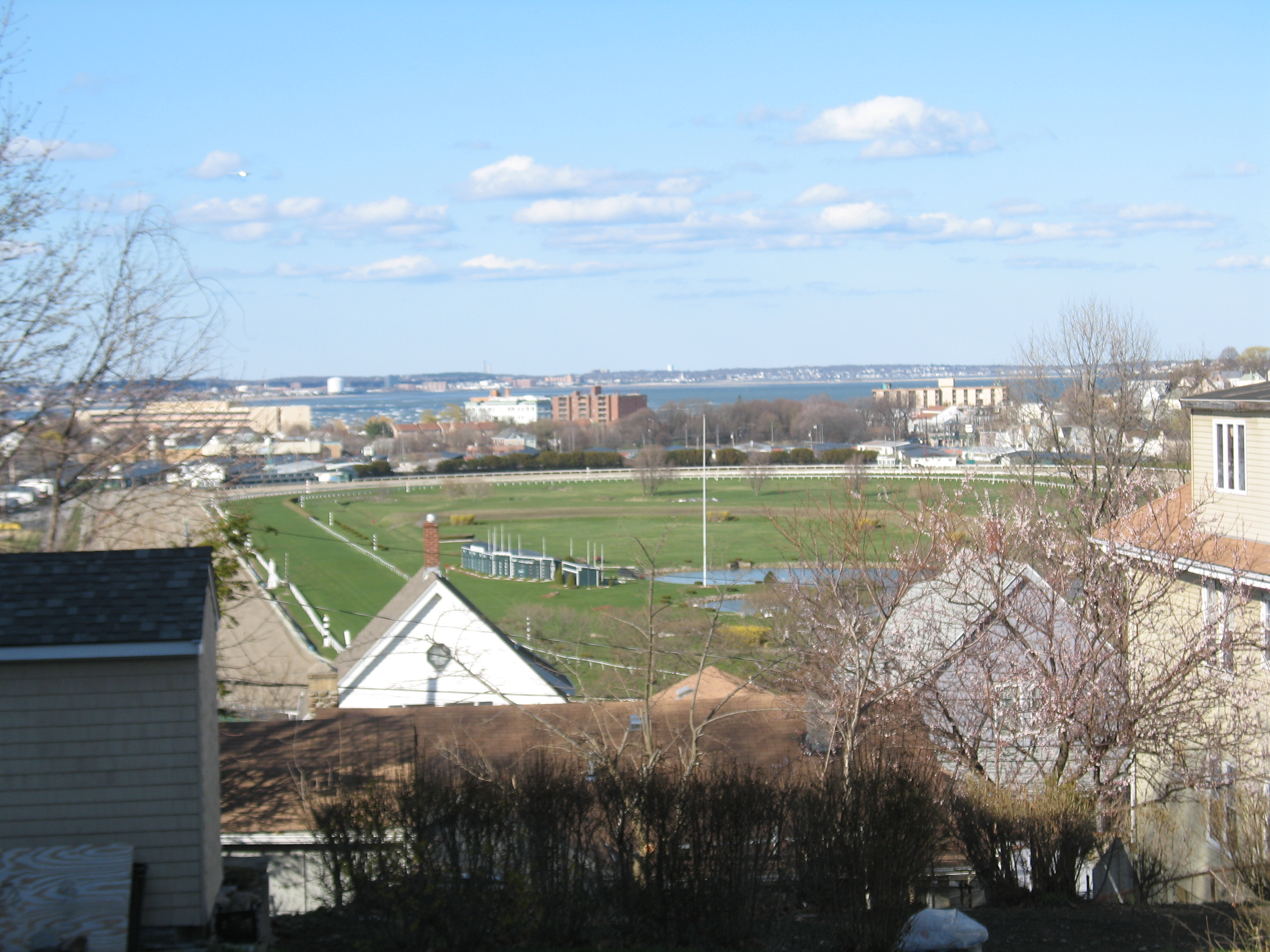
- View of the racetrack from Orient Heights
- Interactive map of Suffolk Downs
- Location: 525 McClellan Highway; East Boston, Massachusetts, United States
- Coordinates: 42.39°N 71.01°W
- Owned by: Eastern Racing Association (first); Sterling Suffolk Racecourse LLC (last)
- Date opened: July 10, 1935 (original); January 1, 1992 (reopening)
- Date closed: December 30, 1989 (original); June 30, 2019(reopening)
- Race type: Thoroughbred
- Course type: Flat
- Notable races: Massachusetts Handicap

Suffolk Downs was a Thoroughbred race track in East Boston, Massachusetts, United States. The track opened in 1935 after being built by Joseph A. Tomasello at a cost of $2 million. It was sold in May 2017 to a developer who plans to create housing and a shopping district. The final day of live racing at the track was June 30, 2019, with the facility hosting simulcast race wagering thereafter. The only remaining live horse racing in Massachusetts is at Plainridge Park Casino, which has harness racing.

A number of famous horses raced at Suffolk Downs, including Seabiscuit, Whirlaway, Funny Cide, and Cigar. The Massachusetts Handicap (or MassCap) was the track's most significant annual event, last held in 2008. The track is a 1-mile (1.6 km) dirt oval with a seven-furlong inner turf track. Non-race functions at the venue included the Hot Dog Safari. The track provided the name of the nearby MBTA Suffolk Downs subway station.

== History ==
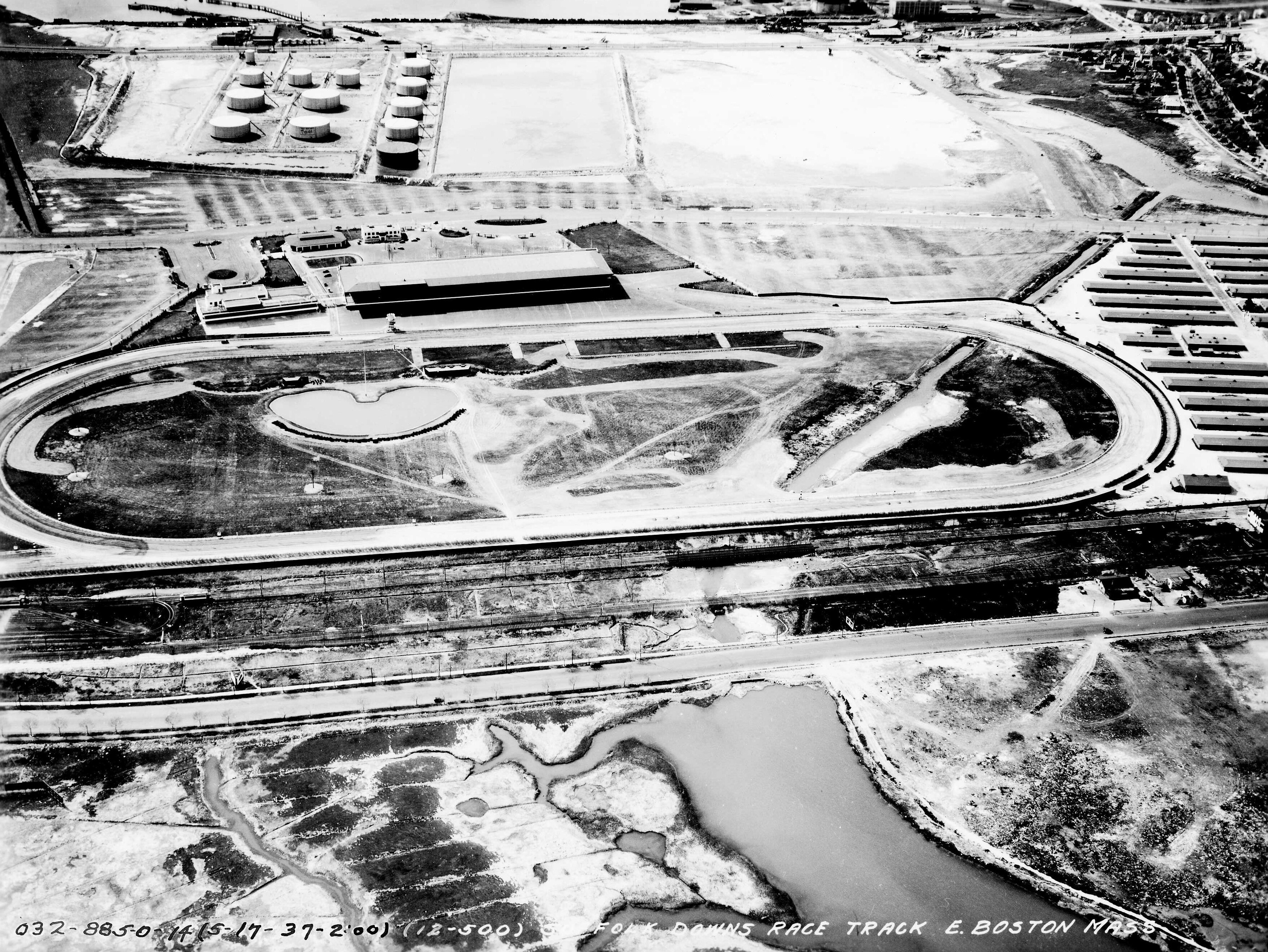
Aerial view, August 1937

=== Opening ===
After parimutuel betting was legalized in Massachusetts, the Eastern Racing Association, Inc. was formed to open a thoroughbred race track in East Boston. Businessman, politician, and former steeplechase jockey Bayard Tuckerman Jr. was the corporation's first president. Harness racing promoter Allan J. Wilson was named vice president. Walter E. O'Hara, promoter of the Narragansett Park was named managing director of the track, however he backed out after a few months because he felt East Boston was not a suitable site for a race track and instead wanted to build a track in Framingham or Natick. Richard Danielson, Charles Adams, Bruce Wetmore, and John R. Macomber were also members of the track's first board of directors.

Eastern Racing Association applied for a track charter and license on January 11, 1935, and on April 9, the Massachusetts Racing Commission granted the corporation a license to race in East Boston. Construction did not begin until April 29 due to legal entanglements.

The track opened on July 10, 1935. The first card consisted of eight races, with the Commonwealth Stakes, a six-furlong race for 3-year-olds, serving as the feature race. The Commonwealth Stakes featured twenty-two horses from eighteen stables, including horses owned by Edward R. Bradley, Alfred Gwynne Vanderbilt Jr., and Cornelius Vanderbilt Whitney. The race was won by Bradley's Boxthorn, which had been a starter in that year's Kentucky Derby. 35,000 spectators watched the first day of racing. Later that month, Seabiscuit would make his Suffolk Downs debut, finishing fourth in the Mayflower Stakes.

The first MassCap was held on October 16, 1935, with Top Row taking first ever victory in the event.

=== Early years ===
On May 7, 1936, Tuckerman stepped down as president. He was succeeded by Charles Adams. Adams himself would step aside in favor of James H. Connors in December 1937. Although Adams stated that he decided to give up the position to focus on his other interests, he would later say that Connors was elected at the behest of Governor Charles F. Hurley.

In 1939, Connors resigned as Suffolk Downs president amid allegations that he, his brother-in-law (State Racing Commissioner Thomas R. Foley), and Outdoor Amusements, Inc. (a company applying for a license to open a track in Westport, Massachusetts) attempted to gain control of horse racing in eastern Massachusetts. According to the Eastern Racing Association, Foley secretly worked to acquire a license for Outdoor Amusements, Inc. while Connors demanded that his fellow Eastern Racing Association shareholders sell him their stake in Suffolk Downs or they would not get any favorable racing dates. The racing commission voted to revoke Outdoor Amusements' license due to misleading information in their application, but found that there was not enough evidence to establish a conspiracy between Outdoor Amusements, Connors, and Foley.

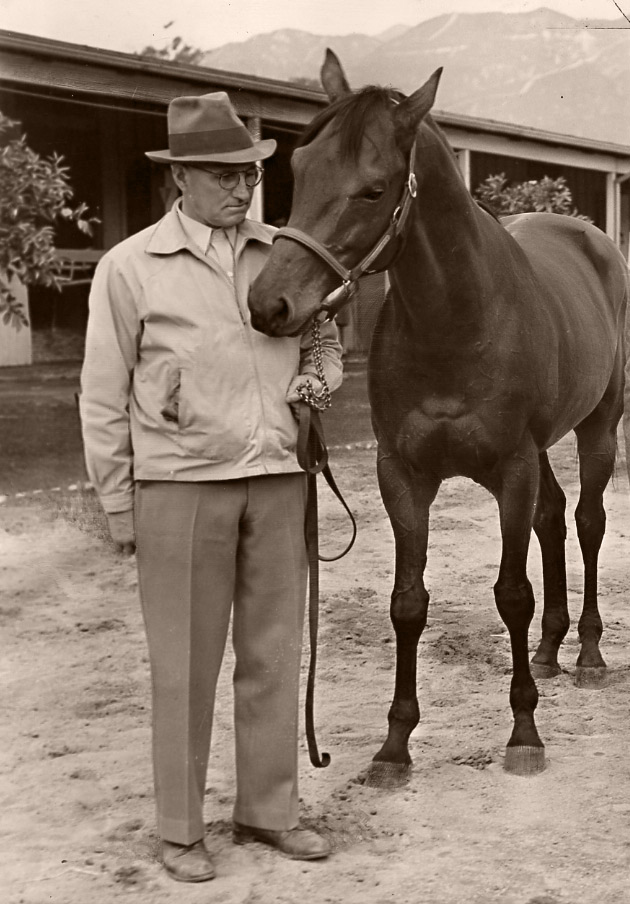
Seabiscuit and trainer Tom Smith

On June 29, 1936, Seabiscuit won an allowance race at Suffolk Downs. This was the first time trainer Tom Smith saw Seabiscuit race and he would later recommend that Charles S. Howard purchase the horse. Smith and Howard would go on to make Seabiscuit a national hero. Seabiscuit would return to the track in 1937 to race in the Massachusetts Handicap. The race was attended by 40,000 people. Seabiscuit won the race in 1:49, which broke the track record for 1 1/8 miles. The victory was Seabiscuit's seventh consecutive win, a career high. The winner's purse of $51,780 was the largest of Seabiscuit's career up to that point and would only be surpassed by his final victory, the 1940 Santa Anita Handicap. In 1938, 60,000 people turned out to watch Seabiscuit defend his MassCap title against War Admiral. However, Seabiscuit was scratched due to an injury minutes before post time. The race was won by Menow. War Admiral finished fourth, breaking his streak of eleven-consecutive victories and marking the only time in his career that he would finish out of the money.

On July 15, 1942, Whirlaway succeeded Seabiscuit as the all-time leading money-earner by winning the MassCap.

During World War II, the track continued to hold races. On August 8, 1942, Suffolk Downs donated $625,000 to the National War Fund. This contribution was the single largest donation to the war effort by any sports venue.

On February 20, 1944, the Aldred Investment Trust purchased a majority of the voting stock in the Eastern Racing Association. Gordon B. Hanlon was elected president of Suffolk Downs. Three months later the U.S. Securities and Exchange Commission announced that it had filed a complaint in federal court accusing Hanlon his fellow directors of the Aldred Investment Trust of gross abuse of the trust, including drastically changing the investment policy of the trust without giving adequate notice to security holders by purchasing stock in the Eastern Racing Association. On January 19, 1945, Judge George Clinton Sweeney found Hanlon and five other Aldred officials guilty of gross abuse of the trust and control of the track was given to the trust's receivers, Edward O. Proctor and Edward F. Goode. On April 24, 1945, the receivers selected Allan J. Wilson to succeed Hanlon as track president.

=== Post-war ===
On May 1, 1946, a consortium, led by Boston businessman John C. Pappas, acquired control of Suffolk Downs at a Federal Court-directed public auction. Pappas' $3.6 million bid exceeded offers made by Joseph F. Timilty, Henry Simberg (represented at the auction by Paul A. Dever), and Bay Meadows Racetrack general manager Bill Kyne.

On July 30, 1947, Stymie became the first horse to eclipse the $700,000 career earnings mark by winning the MassCap. From 1959 to 1970, Suffolk Downs hosted harness racing during the fall.

On June 30, 1960, while riding Lusty Andy at the track, Henry Wajda pulled fellow jockey Anthony DeSpirito back onto Color Bearer after DeSpirito had been knocked off his saddle in the first turn and was clinging to his mount by one hand and had a foot caught in a stirrup. DeSpirito credited Wajda with saving his life. For his bravery, Wajda received honors from the New England Turf Writers and New York Turf Writers organizations.

On March 21, 1964, Pappas sold the track to New York businessman David Haber.

On August 18, 1966, The Beatles played a concert before 24,000 fans on the track's infield. On June 19, 1968, Dancer's Image made his final public appearance. He was escorted onto the track by his owner Peter D. Fuller, son of former Massachusetts Governor Alvan T. Fuller, and his wife Jane.

In 1968, the track was sold to Reality Equities Corporation who brought on former baseball team owner Bill Veeck as president. During Veeck's tenure as president, Suffolk Downs hosted a number of promotions including chariot races, livestock giveaways and mock Indian battles. Veeck also won a number of legal victories, including one which allowed children to attend the races.

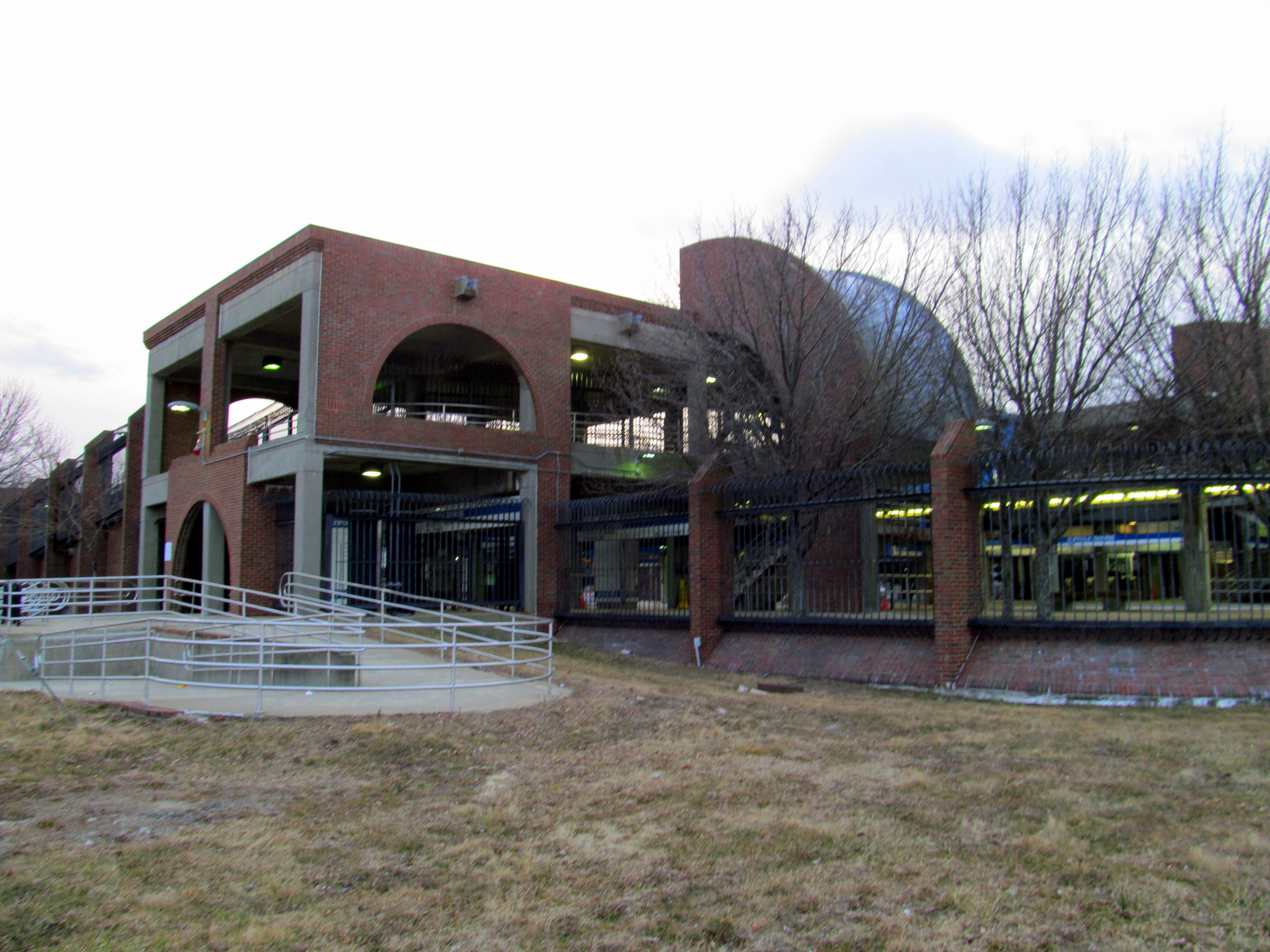
Suffolk Downs MBTA station, which was rebuilt in 1984 and 1995.

In 1971, Realty Equities sold Suffolk Downs to National Raceways Inc., a subsidiary of the National Mattress Company. A year later, the track was sold to Ogden Corporation.

On February 14, 1976, the inbound platform of the Suffolk Downs MBTA station was destroyed by fire, which hurt track attendance. The outbound side of the station remained open The station was rebuilt in 1983 and reopened in January 1984 after the project received a $1.9 million grant from the Urban Mass Transportation Administration. The station was rebuilt again from 1994 to 1995 as part of a larger improvement project on the line.

On May 21, 1983, Preakness Day, Suffolk Downs aired its first simulcast race after the Massachusetts General Court passed a last-minute bill that allowed the track to air and accept bets on races from other tracks. Suffolk Downs handled $161,456 in simulcast bets that day.

=== First closure ===
In 1986, Ogden Corporation sold the track to Belle Isle Ltd., led by Buddy LeRoux. In 1987, LeRoux threatened to close Suffolk Downs unless the state granted financial concessions to the track. In January 1988, the state Legislature gave LeRoux the concessions he asked for, which allowed racing to continue through the 1989 season. LeRoux made it known that he would allow the track's license to expire after the concessions expired, under the premise that racing was no longer profitable. The track closed after racing on December 30, 1989. Races were scheduled for the next day, however, track management canceled them out of fears of vandalism. Between 1990 and 1991, there was no racing at Suffolk Downs.

=== Reopening ===
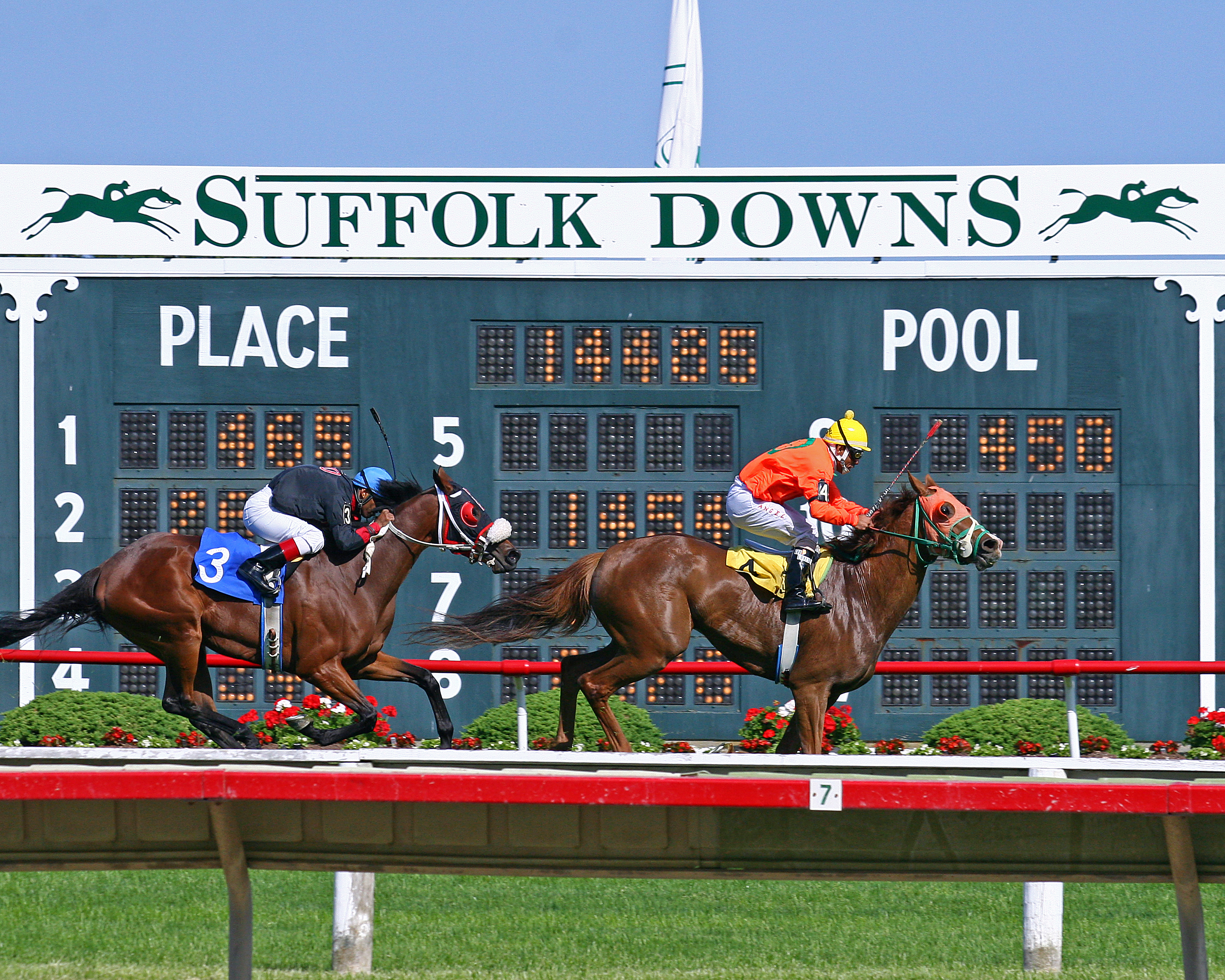
Horses racing in front of the results board in the track infield

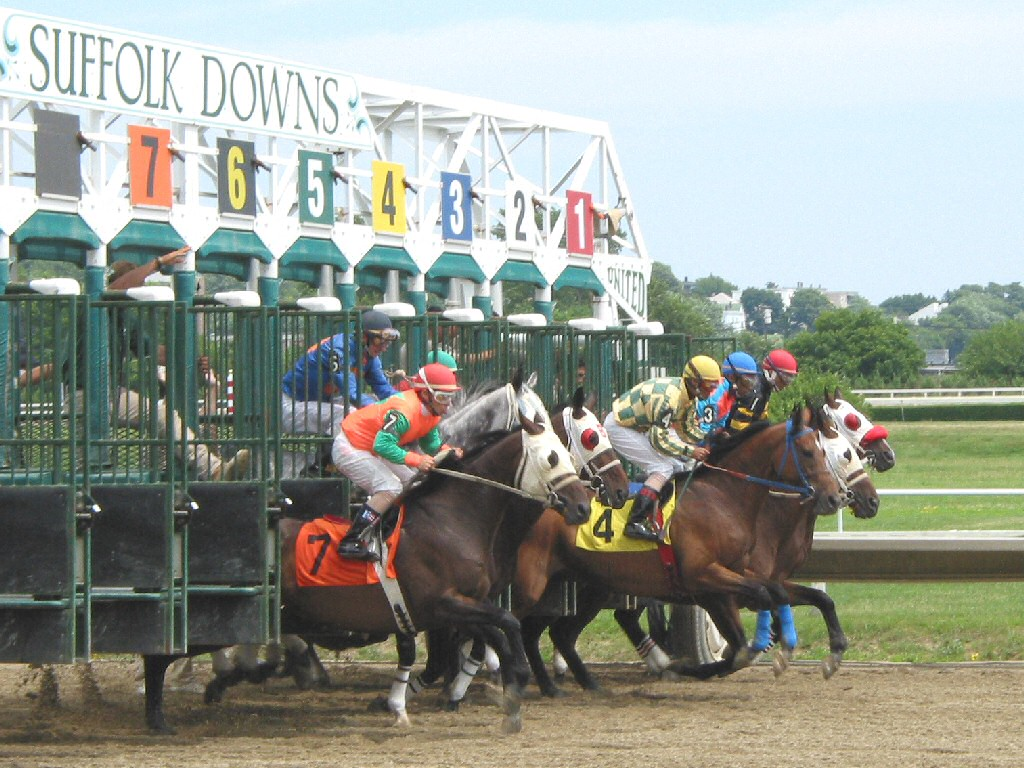
Starting gate at a race in 2004

In May 1991, Sterling Suffolk Racecourse LLC., headed by James B. Moseley and John L. Hall II, leased the track from Belle Isle for $8.5 million. The group spent seven months upgrading and remodeling the track. On January 1, 1992, racing resumed at Suffolk Downs in front of a crowd of 15,212. The track underwent further renovations in 1993, including a new AmTote Spectrum 2000 mutuel system, a newly constructed Clubhouse video lounge, a tribute to MassCap winners in the Grandstand, and a new racing strip. In 1995, the track saw the opening of a redesigned Legends Bar & Grill, improvements to the lighting, upgrades to the backstretch and racetrack, and a remodeled paddock and winner's circle. Also that year, the MassCap returned from a six-year hiatus. Cigar won the race. It was his eighth consecutive victory in his Horse of the Year season. Cigar won the race the following year to earn his 15th consecutive win. The race was attended by 22,000 spectators.

On May 31, 1997, Suffolk Downs hosted New England's first million racing day, with six stakes races including the MassCap.

On July 7, 1997, Sterling Suffolk Racecourse LLC purchased the track from Bell Isle.

On April 9, 1998, James B. Moseley, Suffolk Downs' Chairman of the Board and the man credited with reopening the track, died at the age of 66. He was succeeded on the board by his widow, Patricia.

On June 8, 1998, Suffolk Downs hosted Eddie Andelman's Hot Dog Safari to benefit the Joey Fund/Cystic Fibrosis Foundation. The event was attended by 35,000 people.

On June 19, 1999, Suffolk Downs held its first concert in decades when it hosted the Guinness Fleadh music festival. Thirty acts performed during twelve-hour festival, including Elvis Costello, Hootie and the Blowfish, and John Lee Hooker. Van Morrison was scheduled to appear but cancelled citing "exhaustion".

=== Change in ownership and casino bid ===
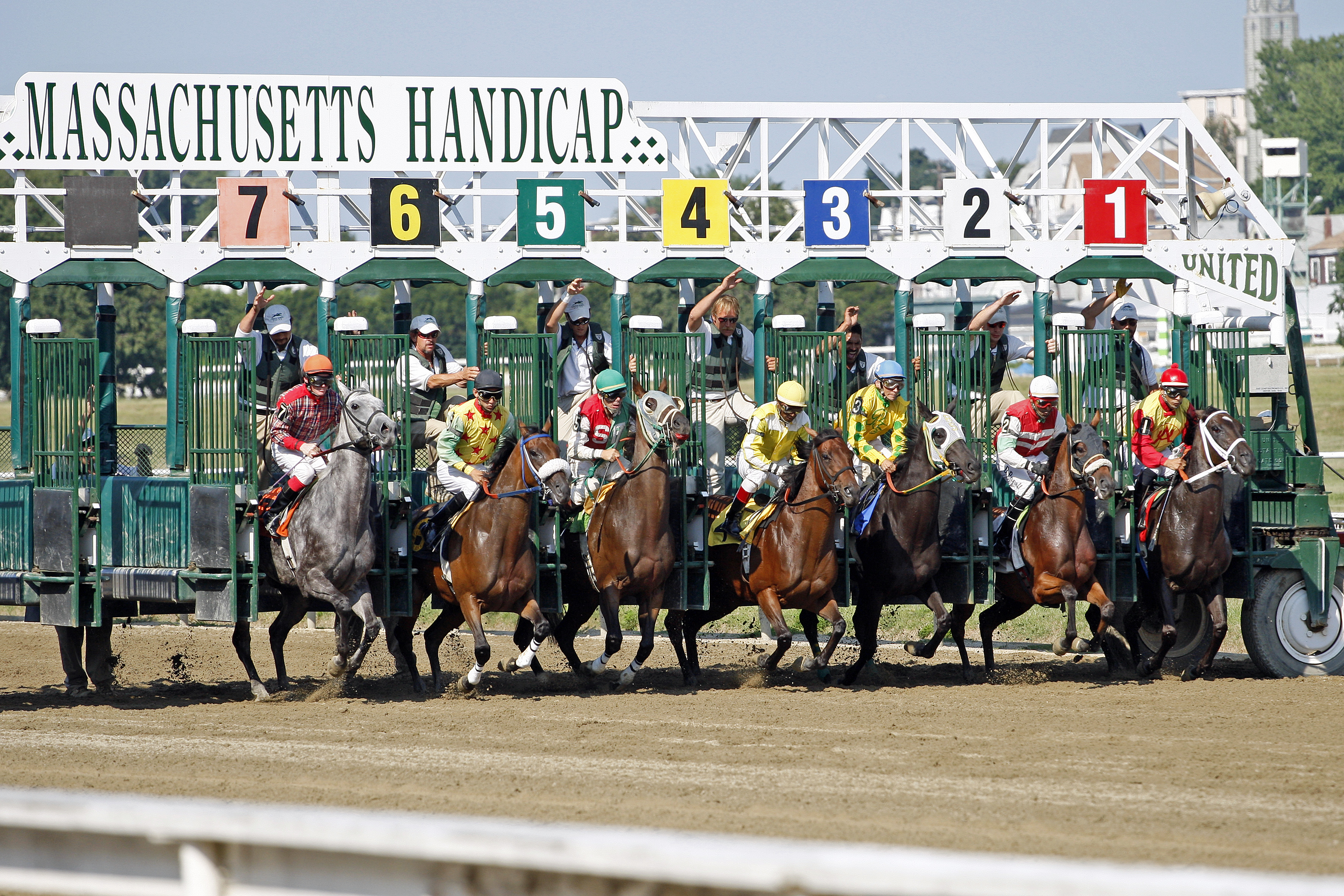
Starting gate at the 2007 Massachusetts Handicap

On March 30, 2007, Coastal Development LLC, a New York-based real estate development company headed by Richard Fields, purchased a majority stake in Sterling Suffolk Racecourse LLC by buying the shares of Patricia Moseley and a number of smaller shareholders. Fields purchased the track with the intent to turn it into a Racino. After casino gambling was legalized in Massachusetts in 2011, the track made a bid for a casino license. The track's owners partnered with Caesars Entertainment Corporation on a plan to build a $1 billion resort casino on the site. In October 2013, Suffolk Downs and Caesars terminated their partnership after the Massachusetts Gaming Commission raised concerns over Caesars' financial state and a business relationship with company allegedly connected to Russian mobsters.

=== Second closure ===
On November 5, 2013, East Boston voters rejected Suffolk Downs' casino proposal with 4,281 votes to 3,353. The track partnered with Mohegan Sun on a project entirely located in Revere, Massachusetts, where Suffolk Downs has 53 acres of property. Suffolk Downs competed with Wynn Resorts plan for a resort in Everett, Massachusetts, that was approved by voters in June, opening in 2019 as the Encore Boston Harbor. Following the approval of Wynn's proposal in September 2014, it was announced that Suffolk Downs would close.

Limited live racing returned in 2015 and on June 9, 2016, the Massachusetts Gaming Commission approved funding for the track to run on 6 days in 2016. The track was open on July 9–10, August 6–7 and September 3–4. In March 2017, the track's owners agreed to sell it to HYM Investment Group, a Boston real estate developer. The owners at the time stated that they were going to lease back the track and operate live racing in 2017 and 2018, and hoped to continue operating as a simulcast facility after the redevelopment of the property. In October 2017, Suffolk Sterling Racecourse announced that plans were underway to open up a new full-time racetrack in Massachusetts to replace Suffolk Downs.

The final season of live racing was May 18–19, June 8–9, and June 29–30, 2019. The last horse to cross the finish line in the final live race at Suffolk Downs was Colonial Front on June 30, 2019. The facility remains open for simulcasting year-round.

=== Redevelopment ===
In May 2017, Suffolk Downs was sold to HYM Investment Group for $155 million to be used as developments. The track will be turned into a housing and shopping district similar to the Boston Landing and Assembly Square developments in the Greater Boston area.

On October 20, 2017, it was revealed that Suffolk Downs would be used in a bid to bring Amazon's second headquarters to Massachusetts. In 2018, it was revealed that the Suffolk Downs development would move forward despite Amazon opting to move its second headquarters to Virginia and New York City.

In June 2023, a performance venue known as The Stage at Suffolk Downs opened inside the racetrack with a capacity of 8,500 people. The first building of the redevelopment is expected to open in spring 2024, with 470 apartments for rent. The overall development plans up to 15,000 residents, retail, restaurants, life sciences laboratory, and 40 acre of open space.

== Administration ==
=== Owners ===
- Eastern Racing Association: January 11, 1935 – January 6, 1969
- Realty Equities Corp.: January 6, 1969 – February 23, 1971
- National Raceways Inc.: February 23, 1971 – February 24, 1972
- Ogden Suffolk Downs, Inc. February 24, 1972 – April 17, 1986
- Belle Isle Limited Partnership: April 17, 1986 – July 7, 1997
  - leased to Sterling Suffolk Racecourse LLC: May 1991–July 7, 1997
- Sterling Suffolk Racecourse LLC: July 7, 1997–May, 2017

=== Presidents ===
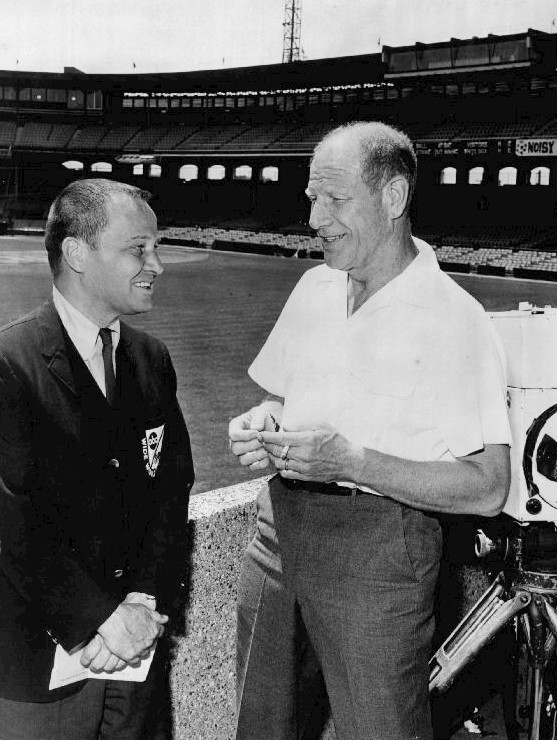
Bill Veeck (right), president of Suffolk Downs from 1968 to 1971

- Bayard Tuckerman Jr.: January 11, 1935 – May 7, 1936
- Charles F. Adams: May 7, 1936 – December 15, 1937
- James H. Connors: December 15, 1937 – January 1, 1939
- Charles F. Adams: January 1, 1939 – February 20, 1944
- Gordon B. Hanlon: February 20, 1944 – April 24, 1945
- Allan J. Wilson: April 24, 1945 – April 17, 1948
- John C. Pappas: April 17, 1948 – March 21, 1964
- David Haber: March 21, 1964 – November 20, 1968
- Bill Veeck: November 20, 1968 – February 3, 1971
- Thomas J. Beedem: February 3, 1971 – February 23, 1971
- James F. Edwards: February 23, 1971 – February 24, 1972
- William F. Connell: February 24, 1972 – September 15, 1972
- Joseph Cresci: September 15, 1972 – 1975
- John MacAniff: 1975–June 26, 1986
- Al Curran: June 26, 1986 – April 6, 1991
- John L. Hall: April 6, 1991 – 2017

== Stakes races ==
Race	Age	Distance	Purse
Massachusetts Handicap	3+	9 furlongs	$500,000
James B. Moseley Sprint Handicap	3+	6 furlongs	$100,000
Drumtop Stakes	Fillies and Mares, 3+	6 furlongs	$50,000
Robert M. O’Malley Memorial	3+	5 furlongs	$50,000
Isadorable Stakes	F and M, 3+	6 furlongs	N/A
Rudy Baez	3+	6 furlongs	N/A
Rise Jim	3+	6 furlongs	N/A
Mom's Command Stakes	F and M, 3+	5 furlongs	N/A
My Fair Lady Stakes	F and M, 3+	1 and 1/16 of a mile	N/A
Old Ironsides Stakes	3+	1 and 1/16 of a mile	N/A
Waquoit Stakes	3+	1 and 1/16 of a mile	N/A
Last Dance Stakes	F and M, 3+	1 mile and 70 yards	N/A
First Episode Stakes	F and M, 3+	1 mile and 70 yards	N/A
Bayard Tuckerman Jr. Stakes	3+	1 1/16th mile
Bay State Handicap	3+	1 1/16th mile
Beef Stake Handicap	3	1 mile and 70 yards
Clyde Park Handicap	3+	1 1/16th mile
Commonwealth Handicap	3+	1 mile and 70 yards
Commonwealth Stakes	3	6 furlongs	1935
Constitution Handicap	2 (later 3)	6 furlongs	1935–?
Faneuil Hall Handicap	3	1 mile and 70 yards
Governors Handicap	3+	6 furlongs	1950–?
Hannah Dustin Handicap	F and M 3+	1 1/16th mile	1967–?
Helena Handicap	F and M 3+	6 furlongs
Independence Stakes	2	6 furlongs
Joe Fan Handicap	3	1 mile and 70 yards
John Alden Handicap	3+	6 furlongs
John R. Macomber Memorial Handicap	3	6 furlongs
Tomasello Memorial Handicap	3	6 furlongs
Lisa Stakes	F 3	6 furlongs
Mayflower Stakes	2	5 1/2 to 8 5/16 furlongs	1935–1988
Myles Standish Stakes	2	5 furlongs	1936–?
New England Juvenile Stakes	New England bred 2	5 furlongs
New England Sophomore Stakes	New England bred 3	6 furlongs	1963–?
Patriots Day Handicap	3+	1 mile and 70 yards
Paul Revere Stakes	3	6 furlongs	1951–?
Pinafore Stakes	F 3	6 furlongs	1964–?
Priscilla Stakes	F 2	5 furlongs
Puritan Handicap	3+	1 mile and 70 yards
Suffolk Downs Handicap	3+	1 1/4th mile	1964–?
Suffolk Sprint	?	6 furlongs	1937–?
Varsity Handicap	3+	6 furlongs
Yankee Gold Cup	3+	2 miles	1967–1969
Yankee Handicap	3	9 furlongs	1935–1988
