= Joseph A. Tomasello =

American contractor

Joseph A. Tomasello (1883–1936) was an American contractor.

== Early life ==
Tomasello was born in 1883 in Messina. When he was 7 years old his family moved to Boston. During his youth, Tomasello worked in a tobacco store and metal polish factory before joining his father Antonio G. Tomasello's construction business at the age of 16. His first construction job was as a timekeeper at the construction site of the United Shoe Machinery Corporation factory in Beverly, Massachusetts. He took night courses in engineering and in 1906 became a licensed steam engineer. When he was 20, Tomasello went to work for the Claremont Power Company, where he was put in charge of a dam construction project.

== A. G. Tomasello & Son ==
In 1911, Tomasello became a partner in his father's firm, which became known as A. G. Tomasello & Son. Inc. The pair's projects included sewerage systems for Providence, Rhode Island and Beverly, Massachusetts and a water supply system for Salem, Massachusetts.

Antonio G. Tomasello retired in 1920 and Joseph took over the business. In 1921, Tomasello helped organize the New England Road Builders' Association. He served as its first-ever vice president and treasurer and in 1930 was elected its president. A. G. Tomasello & Son. received the contract to pave the first concrete street in Boston. The road, which was a stretch of Commonwealth Avenue between Warren Street and Sutherland Road, was opened to the public on July 7, 1923. In 1925, Tomasello's company was hired to excavate for a garage in downtown Boston. On July 4, 1925, a wall collapsed in the Pickwick Club, the building next to the excavation site, killing 44 people. It is the deadliest building collapse in Boston's history. The grand jury tasked with investigating the collapse indicted 10 men, including the general contractor of the garage project and two of his employees, for manslaughter, but did not return an indictment against Tomasello. By 1931, Tomasello had overseen the construction of 20 bridges in Boston, part of the MBTA subway, the Fields Corner station, the Boston Elevated Railway extension from Harrison Square to Geneva Street, and was beginning work on the George Wright Golf Course. In 1935, the Eastern Racing Association contracted Tomasello's company to construct the state's first thoroughbred race track. Tomasello led the project, which employed 900 carpenters, 200 electricians and plumbers, 100 plasterers, and 1800 laborers assisted by 638 trucks, 36 bulldozers, and 24 power shovels. The track included the nation's first concrete grandstand, which was also the largest in the country with a capacity of 16,000. The project was completed in a mere 62 days at a cost of $2 million and Suffolk Downs opened on July 10, 1935.

== Philanthropy ==
In addition to his construction business, Tomasello was also involved in charitable work. He was instrumental in the founding of the Italian Home for Children and his company put in the Home's foundation for free. In 1931 he was made a Cavalier of the Order of the Crown of Italy by Victor Emmanuel III of Italy for his charitable work.

== Politics ==
A member of the Democratic Party, Tomasello was a strong supporter of James Michael Curley. He was appointed to the Boston Board of Appeals by Mayor Malcolm Nichols. Tomasello was urged to run in the 1933 Boston mayoral election. On December 8, 1932, representatives from 22 local civic groups who supported Tomasello gathered at the American House to adopt a plan of action if he chose to enter the race. On February 5, 1932, Tomasello and his wife left for Hot Springs, Arkansas. As he was departing the city, Tomasello was cheered by supporters and he promised an announcement on his political future when he returned. On July 4, 1933, Tomasello became the first Italian American to deliver the annual speech at the city's Independence Day celebration at Faneuil Hall. In his speech, Tomasello highlighted the contributions Italian Americans, including Christopher Columbus, Americo Vespucci, Francis Vigo, and William Paca, had made to the country. On September 14, 1933, Tomasello announced that he would not run for mayor, citing business pressures that would not allow him to devote time to the campaign. On December 20, 1935, Tomasello was elected president of the League for American Neutrality, a group formed by prominent Italian-Americans that opposed American involvement in the Second Italo-Ethiopian War. Tomasello also served as treasurer of the Massachusetts Democratic Committee.

== Illness and death ==
On February 10, 1936, Tomasello and his wife were in Hot Springs when they were informed that their son, Joseph A. Tomasello Jr., had fallen seriously ill. The couple chartered a plane and flew 13 hours through storms to reach Boston. However, upon arriving at the East Boston Airport, they were informed that their son had died a half-hour prior.

Tomasello caught a Pneumococcal infection on his trip back to Boston. Upon learning of his son's death, Tomasello put off seeking treatment and his condition worsened into an infection of the middle ear which in turn caused a bloodstream infection. On February 20, 1936, his condition became grave and a special pneumococcus type 8 serum was flown in from the Rockefeller Institute. Tomasello died the following day at the age of 53. His funeral at St. Thomas Aquinas Church in Jamaica Plain drew 3000 mourners. He was buried in Holyhood Cemetery.

Following his death, Tomasello's wife Frances took over the construction company. In 1938, Suffolk Downs began running the Joseph A. Tomasello Memorial Handicap in honor of the track's builder.
