= Charles Adams (ice hockey) =

American businessman (1876–1947)

- Born: October 18, 1876; Newport, Vermont, U.S.
- Died: October 2, 1947 (aged 70); Boston, Massachusetts, U.S.
- Occupations: American businessman, sports team owner
- Board member of: Boston Bruins; Suffolk Downs; Boston Braves
- Parent(s): Frank Adams; Elizabeth Benoit
- Honors: Hockey Hall of Fame (1960)

Charles Francis Adams (October 18, 1876 – October 2, 1947) was an American businessman and sports promoter who was the co-founder of the Boston Bruins. He was also owner of the Boston Braves and Suffolk Downs, and part-owner of The First National grocery store chain.

== Early life ==
Adams was born in Newport, Vermont, on October 18, 1876, to Frank and Elizabeth (Benoit) Adams. His family struggled financially and at a young age Adams took a job as a chore boy at a corner grocery store to help subsidize the family's income. As a teenager Adams purchased logs for his father's sawmill.

== Grocery career ==
After graduating from Jenney Business College in Enosburgh, Vermont, Adams moved to Springfield, Vermont, where he worked for his uncle Oscar Adams' wholesale grocery business. After working for a time as a traveling grocer and tobacco salesman, Adams moved to Cambridge, Massachusetts, where he became treasurer of the New England Maple Syrup Company. He later worked for the Fitzgerald, Hubbard & Company banking and brokerage firm.

Adams left Fitzgerald, Hubbard & Company to work for the John T. Connor Company, which later became the First National Store Finast chain.

== Sports ==
=== Boston Bruins ===
Adams was an avid hockey fan, watching amateur hockey in Boston and traveling to Montreal to watch professional hockey. After a scandal involving Boston amateur hockey players resulted in many Boston fans becoming disenchanted with amateur hockey, Adams decided to try to bring professional hockey to the United States. On November 1, 1924, Adams was awarded the Bruins franchise for $15,000. The team's original colors of brown and yellow came from the color scheme of First National.

In 1926 Adams bought the entire Western Canada Hockey League from Frank Patrick and Lester Patrick for $300,000. This gave the Bruins the rights to Eddie Shore, Harry Oliver, Duke Keats, and Frank Boucher. To ensure the team had a fitting arena to play in, Adams guaranteed $500,000 toward the construction of the Boston Garden.

Under his leadership the Bruins won their first Stanley Cup in 1929.

In 1936 he transferred his stock to his son Weston Adams, general manager Art Ross, and Ralph Burkard.

=== Boston Braves ===
On May 15, 1927, Charles Adams bought out the shares of Albert H. Powell to become a minority owner and vice-president of the National League baseball club, the Boston Braves. In 1935, after Emil Fuchs' attempt to revive interest in the team by signing Babe Ruth failed, Adams demanded that Fuchs either step down as President or buy out his shares. On July 31, after eleventh-hour efforts to sell the team failed, Fuchs relinquished his shares to Adams, who planned to sell the team as soon as possible. On November 26, the National League took over control of the Braves due to the club's failure to fulfill its contractual obligations. The club was awarded to Bob Quinn on December 10. Commissioner Kenesaw Mountain Landis did not allow Adams to be part of the new ownership group due to his stake in Suffolk Downs. Adams never had any intention of taking a major role in the Braves' operations in any case. Despite this, he retained 73 percent of the stock until Quinn and his partners bought it in 1941.

=== Suffolk Downs ===
Adams was the head of Eastern Racing Association, the syndicate that founded Suffolk Downs. He remained involved with the race track until 1945, when he sold his shares for $4 million.

== Death and legacy ==
Adams died in Boston on October 2, 1947, 16 days before his 71st birthday, after a long illness.

He was elected to the Hockey Hall of Fame in 1960.

The NHL's Adams Division was formed in 1974 as part of the Prince of Wales Conference. The division existed for 19 seasons until 1993. It was named in honor of Adams. The Bruins were a member of the Adams Division for the entirety of its existence, winning nine division titles and appearing in four Stanley Cup Finals in that time. It was succeeded by the Northeast Division, which was dissolved with the league's 2013 realignment, and can be considered the fore-runner of the NHL's current Atlantic Division.

Adams was inducted into the Vermont Sports Hall of Fame in 2013.

Preceded by First	President of the Boston Bruins; 1924–36	Succeeded by Weston Adams
Preceded by First	Boston Bruins principal owner 1924–36	Succeeded by Weston Adams
Preceded by Bayard Tuckerman Jr.	President of Suffolk Downs; 1936–37	Succeeded by James H. Connors
Preceded by James H. Connors	President of Suffolk Downs; 1939–44	Succeeded by Gordon B. Hanlon
