= Robert Earl Sawyer =

American playwright and actor

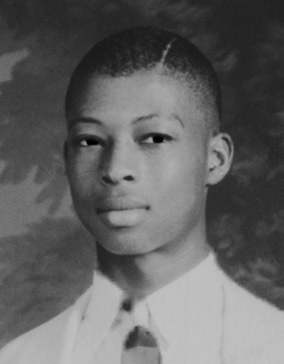
- Sawyer in 1942
- Born: June 5, 1923; Miami, Florida, United States
- Died: November 11, 1994 (aged 71); San Francisco, California, United States
- Education: NYU and Lajos Egri
- Known for: Playwright
- Children: Errol, Wanda, Robert, Kevin, Mia

Robert Earl Sawyer (June 5, 1923 – November 11, 1994) was an American playwright, director and actor.

== Early life ==
Sawyer was born in Miami, Florida. His parents were Robert Wolworth Sawyer and Merline Thompson Sawyer who emigrated to Florida from Nassau, Bahamas. He graduated from the Booker T. Washington High School in Miami.

Sawyer was a United States World War II veteran. After his separation from the military he attended New York University where he studied English and Drama, majoring in creative writing. He spent two additional years of study at the Lajos Egri's School of Writing in New York, where he studied advance creative writing.

== Professional life ==
He starred, produced and directed his own plays as well as the plays of other writers in New York City, Miami, Washington D.C., Las Vegas, San Francisco, and Los Angeles.

His plays include:

- Blood in Mississippi (1957) a political play.
- What's Good for the Goose (1958), a two-act comedy about marriage fidelity.
- The Breadwinner, (1959) a comedy drama in three acts. The story of the indomitable spirit of a proud and beautiful woman who struggles to overcome all the moral and physical agonies of poverty in order to provide her two children with a better future.

Of The Breadwinner, Stephan Miller wrote in Seattle Post-Intelligencer in 1971:

One of the beauties of Robert Earl Sawyer’s play ... is that it leaves you feeling so good. It leaves you feeling that whatever miseries consume you at the moment, those of the characters are so much worse and so much more gracefully overcome.

From 1980 until his death in 1994, Sawyer had his own production company called RES (Robert Earl Sawyer) Productions. Sawyer wrote, produced and directed the first black television soap opera Rainbow Street, in 1989. It aired in Atlanta, GA, Pasadena, CA, Los Angeles, CA and Las Vegas, NV, in 1989.

== Activism ==
Sawyer was a lifelong activist for human rights, particularly for minorities in the world of arts. He insisted upon a substantially increased representation of minorities in the literary and screen world.

Melody Malmberg wrote in "The Outsiders" in The Weekly, Altadena, in 1984:
Despite the appearance of progress, black artists still find that the entertainment industry is a private club. Here's why. Six people sat in the Lake Avenue Studio of the Federation for the Advancement of Minority Artists (FAMA) on a recent morning. The talk turned to their professional life. Joe Montell, executive director of FAMA, acted as host. The guests were: Josephine Toussaint, Don Davis, Joseph Taylor, Robert Earl Sawyer and Marlene Labat. Quotations by Robert E. Sawyer:

It's not a problem being black - the problem rests with the undeveloped mentality of those who are in a position to make a moral and intellectual decision about the fundamental equality of minorities. And by having this malfunction they deny the literary and screen world the right to enjoy other cultures and musical and writing geniuses. And at the other side, the lethargy of the black businessman - and the lack of support of black people - also have contributed to the demise and decimation of black talent. It seems to be an unholy union of white discrimination and black lethargy. But the problem is 'not' being black.

== Personal life ==
He was married to Mamie Lucille Donaldson from 1943 until 1950. They had two children: Errol Sawyer (b. August 8, 1943), photographer, and Wanda Louise Sawyer (b. January 11, 1945 - d. 1984).
From 1957 until 1974 Sawyer lived together with actress Martha Louise Davis. They had three children: Robert Alexander Sawyer (b. April 19, 1962), novelist; Kevin DéRoi Sawyer (b. September 28, 1963); Mia Monét Sawyer (b. January 7, 1965).
From 1975 until 1986 Sawyer lived and worked together with actress Marlene Labat.

== Death ==
Robert Earl Sawyer died November 11, 1994, in Oakland, California. He is buried on the Hayward Graveyard in Oakland.
