= Scarborough Downs =

Horse-racing track in Scarborough, Maine

Coordinates: 43°35′59.52″N 70°21′7.44″W

Scarborough Downs Race Track was a horse-racing track located in Scarborough, Maine, United States. It was Maine's largest race track. It was home to The Downs Club restaurant as well as a grandstand for race viewing, and includes 2 track-side lounges as well as a VIP Room. It held its final races on November 30, 2020.

Scarborough Downs was constructed in 1949 as a racetrack for thoroughbred horse races and was completed in 1950. It was the only one of its kind in the state. Harness racing was introduced in the 1960s and for a while the track hosted both types of horse racing. However, in September 1972 the track became solely a harness racing track. In the 2000s, owner Joseph Ricci, also known for being one of the founders of the infamous Élan School, introduced simulcast wagering and the track began to offer simulcast races from premier thoroughbred and harness tracks from around North America.

On October 1, 1980, a pre-dawn fire at Scarborough Downs, ignited as the result of an overloaded electrical box in a tack room, destroyed a 240-foot barn, killing eleven horses. The track hosted its final race ever on November 28, 2020, due to an agreement with developer Mike Cianchette, great-nephew of former Bangor and Lewiston Track Owner Bud Cianchette. The racing meet will move to Cumberland Fairgrounds which has held long meets before, with the expectation it will be full-time horse racing course by 2022; this plan did not come to fruition.

MaineHealth used the facility as a COVID-19 vaccine distribution site beginning in February 2021.
