= John C. Pappas =

Greek-American jurist and businessman

Special Justice of the Gloucester District Court
- In office 1935–1965

Personal details
- Born: July 15, 1906 Filiatra, Greece
- Died: December 3, 1972 (aged 66)
- Political party: Democratic
- Spouse: Katherine Plakias
- Children: 7
- Occupation: Jurist, businessman

John C. Pappas (1906–1972) was a Greek-American jurist and businessman.

== Early life ==
Pappas was born in Filiatra, Greece. In 1911, Pappas immigrated to the United States with his family. He spent his early years in Somerville, Massachusetts, where he worked part-time in his father's store. After graduating from Somerville High School, Pappas attended Boston College and Boston University's College of Business Administration before transferring to Boston University School of Law. He graduated in 1925 and passed the bar the following year. In 1939 he married Katherine Plakias. The Pappases had seven children and resided in Belmont, Massachusetts, before moving to Milton, Massachusetts.

== Politics ==
In 1928, Pappas was appointed to the executive committee of the Massachusetts Democratic Party. In 1933 he was appointed assistant secretary to Governor Joseph B. Ely. In 1935, he was appointed a special justice of the Gloucester District Court. He remained on the bench until his resignation in 1965.

== Business ==
Pappas and his brother Thomas took over their father's chain of neighborhood food stores in 1936. They began a successful import business and a liquor distributorship and were the largest importer of Spanish olives in the United States. Along with Standard Oil and Republic Steel, the Pappas family financed oil refineries, chemical plants, and steel mills in Greece under the name Esso Pappas. The Pappases also owned shipping line which had a fleet of eight tankers in 1965.

On May 1, 1946, a consortium led by Pappas acquired controlling interest in Suffolk Downs at a Federal Court-directed public auction for $3.6 million. Pappas' bid exceeded offers made by Joseph F. Timilty, Henry Simberg (represented at the auction by Paul A. Dever), and Bay Meadows Racetrack general manager Bill Kyne. Pappas was Suffolk Downs' chairman from 1946 to 1948 and was president of the racetrack from 1948 until he sold it in 1964.

In the 1960s, Pappas branched out into real estate development. He funded the construction of apartments in Boston's South End and Kenmore Square, office buildings in South Boston and Springfield, Massachusetts, and a 500,000-square-foot warehouse in Dorchester for Sears, Roebuck & Co. The success of the Sears project led the company to have Pappas manage construction of a new store and parking garage in White Plains, New York. There, Pappas constructed White Plains Plaza, a 15-story office building that was leased quickly upon completion. White Plains soon became a premier location for corporations and the Pappas family, under the leadership of John's son Jim Pappas, constructed two more buildings in the city before declaring bankruptcy in 1992.

Pappas died on December 3, 1972, at the age of 66.
