= List of NHL players with the most games played by franchise =

The National Hockey League (NHL) is a major professional ice hockey league which operates in Canada and the United States. Below is a list of players who have played with one franchise, including 2 or more stints if they have briefly played elsewhere. A player who reaches the 1,000 game milestone is awarded a silver stick.

Fifty of the listed players who have played 1,000 games have played for only one franchise (of which 17 are still active as of the current 2023–24 season). Five of those players played exclusively for the Detroit Red Wings and four played for the Montreal Canadiens, those teams having the most such players.

== Players with the most games played by franchise ==
The following is an index of top 10 players who have played the most games with a single NHL franchise, as of the conclusion of the 2025–26 NHL season.

Key of colors and symbols
Color/symbol	Explanation
†	Inducted into the Hockey Hall of Fame
↑	Active with current team
	Active but not with the team

=== Anaheim Ducks ===
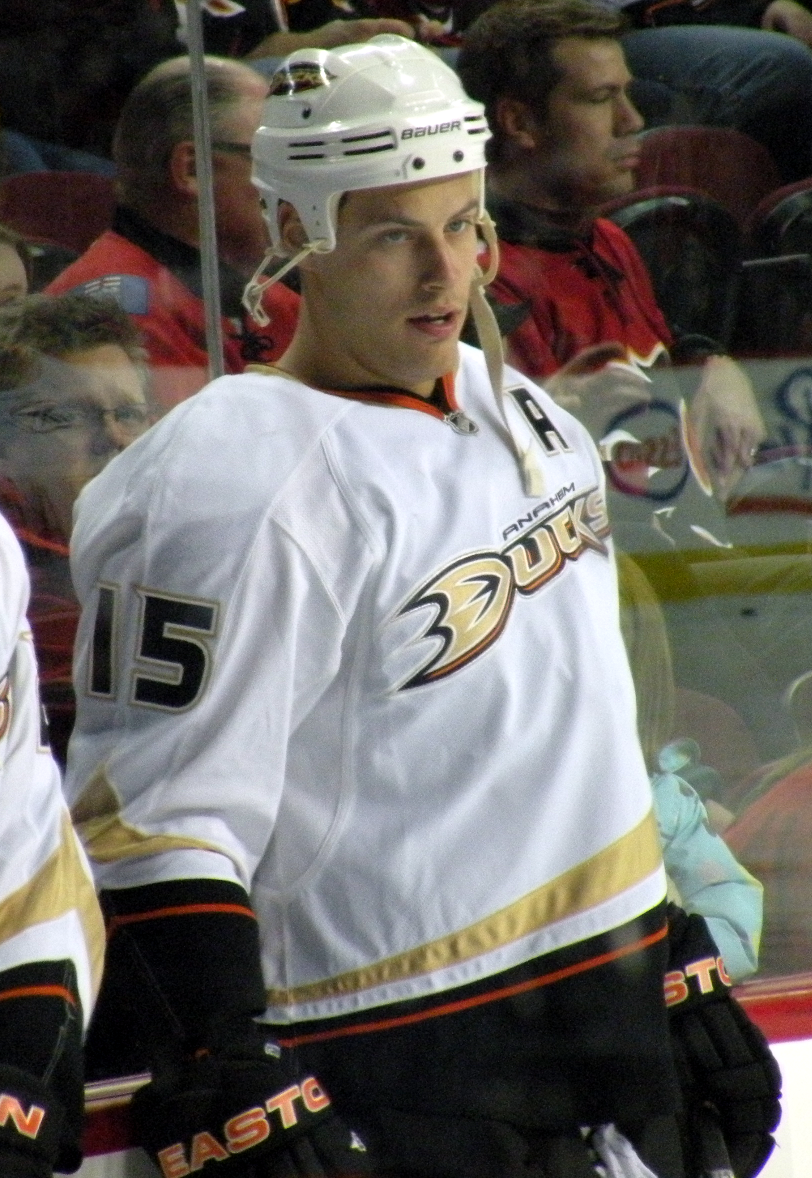
Ryan Getzlaf is the first Anaheim Duck to play all 1,000 games with the team.

Player	Seasons played with team	Games played	Notes	Ref(s)
Ryan Getzlaf	17	1,157	Played entire career with the team (2005–2022)	
Cam Fowler	14	991	(2010–2024)	
Corey Perry	14	988	(2005–2019)	
Teemu Selanne†	15	966	Played with the team on two separate occasions (1996–2001, 2005–2014)	
Jakob Silfverberg	11	772	(2013–2024)	
Steve Rucchin	10	616	(1994–2004)	
Paul Kariya†	9	606	(1994–2003)	
Ruslan Salei	10	594	(1996–2006)	
Francois Beauchemin	10	592	Played with the team on three separate occasions (2005–2009, 2011–2015, 2017–2018)	
Andrew Cogliano	8	584	(2011–2019)	

The franchise was previously known as the Mighty Ducks of Anaheim from 1993 to 2006.

=== Arizona Coyotes ===
Note: The Coyotes franchise has suspended operations as of the conclusion of the 2023–24 NHL season.

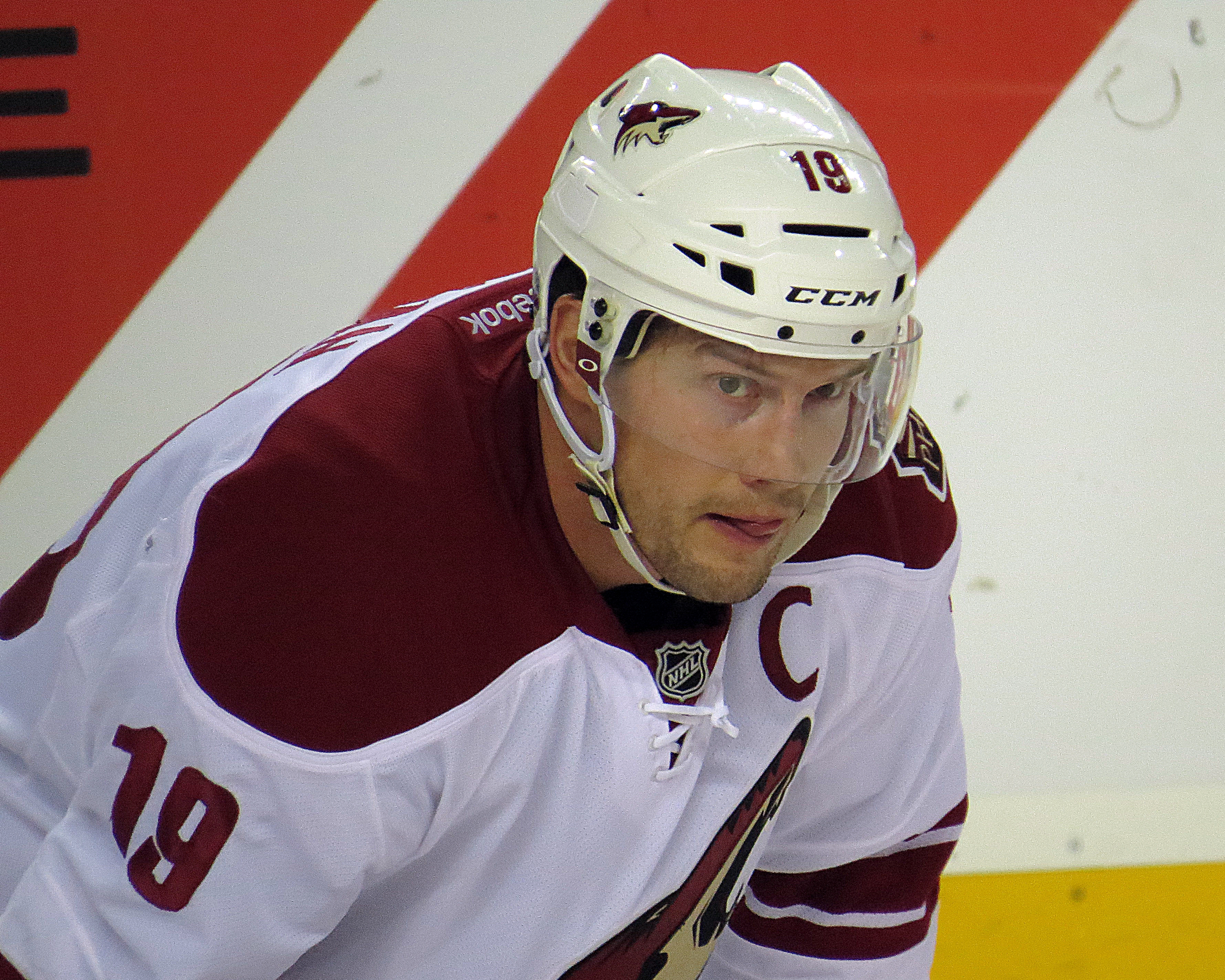
Shane Doan played his entire career with the Jets/Coyotes franchise, including reaching 1,000 games as the last active player from the original Winnipeg Jets.

Player	Seasons played with team	Games played	Notes	Ref(s)
Shane Doan	21	1,540	Winnipeg (original) (1995–1996); Phoenix/Arizona (1996–2017); Played entire career with the team	
Teppo Numminen	15	1,098	Winnipeg (original) (1988–1996); Phoenix (1996–2003)	
Thomas Steen	14	950	Winnipeg (original) (1981–1996); Played entire career with the team	
Oliver Ekman-Larsson	11	769	(2010–2021)	
Dale Hawerchuk†	9	713	(1981–1990)	
Doug Smail	11	691	(1980–1990)	
Keith Tkachuk	9	640	Winnipeg (original) (1992–1996); Phoenix (1996–2001)	
Zbynek Michalek	10	612	Played with the team on three separate occasions (2005–2010, 2013–2015, 2015–2017)	
Martin Hanzal	10	608	(2007–2017)	
Randy Carlyle	10	564	(1984–1993)	

The franchise was originally known as the Winnipeg Jets from 1979 to 1996 (not to be confused with the current Winnipeg Jets), and was also previously known as the Phoenix Coyotes from 1996 to 2014.

=== Boston Bruins ===
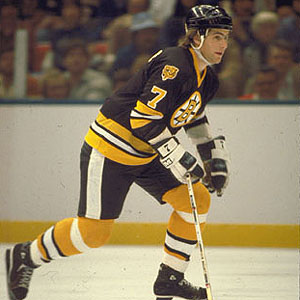
Ray Bourque, the NHL's leading scorer for defensemen, played 1,518 games with the Bruins.

Player	Seasons played with team	Games played	Notes	Ref(s)
Ray Bourque†	21	1,518	(1979–2000)	
Johnny Bucyk†	21	1,436	(1957–1978)	
Patrice Bergeron	19	1,294	Played entire career with the team (2003–2023)	
Brad Marchand	15	1,090	(2009–2025)	
Don Sweeney	15	1,052	(1988–2003)	
David Krejci	16	1,032	Played entire career with the team (2006–2021, 2022–2023); Played overseas during the 2021–22 NHL season	
Wayne Cashman	17	1,027	Played entire career with the team (1964–1965, 1967–1983)	
Zdeno Chara†	14	1,023	(2006–2020)	
Terry O'Reilly	14	891	Played entire career with the team (1971–1985)	
Rick Middleton	14	881	(1976–1988)	

=== Buffalo Sabres ===
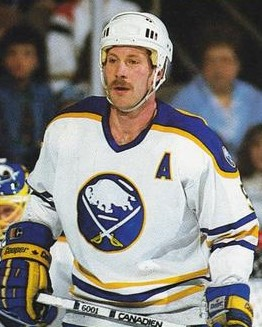
Mike Ramsey is one of three Sabres to have played for the team in three different decades.

Player	Seasons played with team	Games played	Notes	Ref(s)
Gilbert Perreault†	17	1,191	Played entire career with the team (1970–1987)	
Craig Ramsay	14	1,070	Played entire career with the team (1971–1985)	
Mike Ramsey	14	911	(1979–1993)	
Rob Ray	14	889	(1989–2003)	
Bill Hajt	14	854	(1973–1987)	
Dave Andreychuk†	12	837	Played with the team on two separate occasions (1982–1993, 2000–2001)	
Don Luce	10	766	(1971–1981)	
Jason Pominville	11	733	Played with the team on two separate occasions (2003–2013, 2017–2019)	
Alexei Zhitnik	10	712	(1995–2004)	
Zemgus Girgensons	10	688	(2013–2024); Missed the entire 2020–21 season due to injury.	

=== Calgary Flames ===
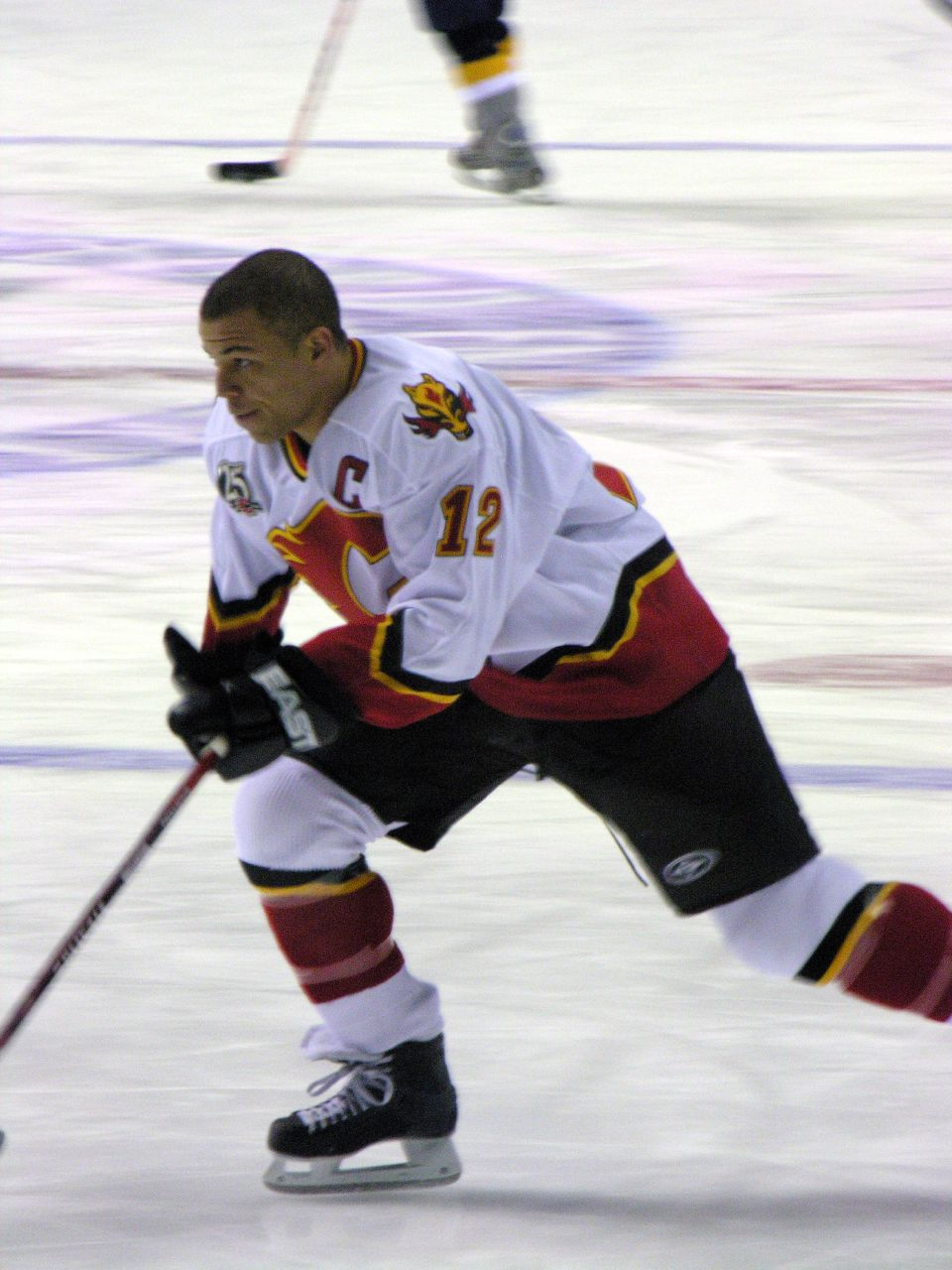
Jarome Iginla is the first Calgary Flame to play 1,000 games with the team.

Player	Seasons played with team	Games played	Notes	Ref(s)
Jarome Iginla †	16	1,219	Debuted during the 1996 Stanley Cup playoffs First regular season game came in the 1996–97 season (1996–2013)	
Mikael Backlund↑	18	1,148	Played entire career with the team (2009–present)	
Mark Giordano	16	949	(2006–2021)	
Robyn Regehr	11	827	(1999–2011)	
Al MacInnis †	13	803	(1981–1994)	
Theoren Fleury	11	791	(1989–1999)	
Joel Otto	11	730	(1984–1995)	
Jim Peplinski	11	711	Played with the team on two separate occasions (1980–90, 1995)	
Sean Monahan	9	656	(2013–2022)	
T. J. Brodie	10	634	(2010–2020)	

The franchise was originally known as the Atlanta Flames from 1972 to 1980.

=== Carolina Hurricanes ===
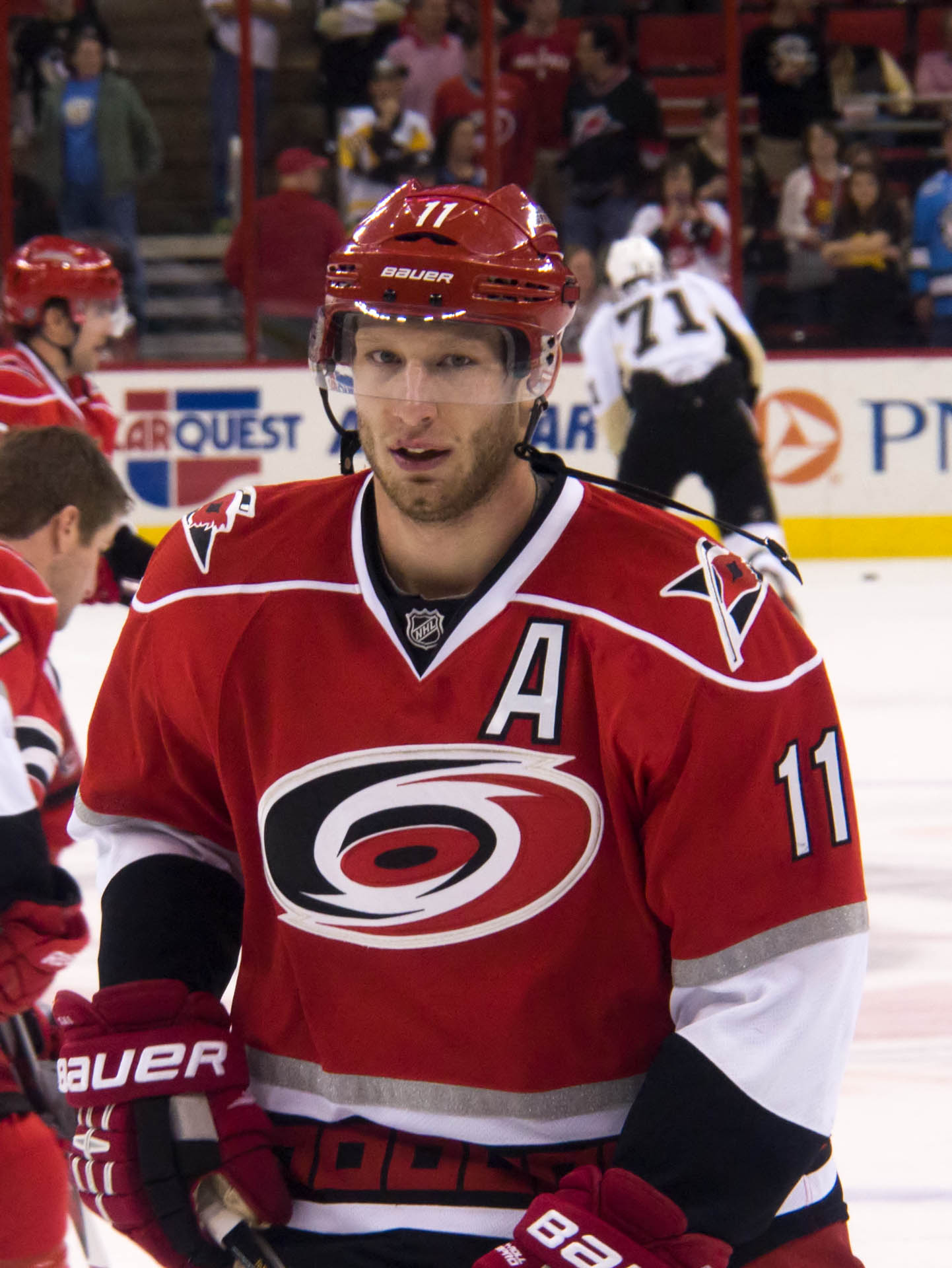
Jordan Staal (pictured) and his brother Eric have played the most games with the Hurricanes, the Whalers statistics notwithstanding.

Player	Seasons played with team	Games played	Notes	Ref(s)
Ron Francis†	16	1,186	Hartford (1981–1991); Carolina (1998–2004)	
Jordan Staal↑	14	972	(2013–present)	
Glen Wesley	13	913	Hartford (1995–97); Carolina (1997–2003, 2003–2008)	
Eric Staal	12	909	(2003–2016)	
Jaccob Slavin↑	11	784	Played entire career with the team (2015–present)	
Sebastian Aho↑	10	756	(2016–present)	
Kevin Dineen	12	708	Hartford (1984–1991, 1995–1997); Carolina (1997–1999)	
Rod Brind'Amour	9	694	(2000–2010)	
Jeff O'Neill	9	673	Hartford (1995–1997); Carolina (1997–2003)	
Cam Ward	13	668	(2005–2018)	

The franchise was originally known as the Hartford Whalers from 1979 to 1997.

=== Chicago Blackhawks ===
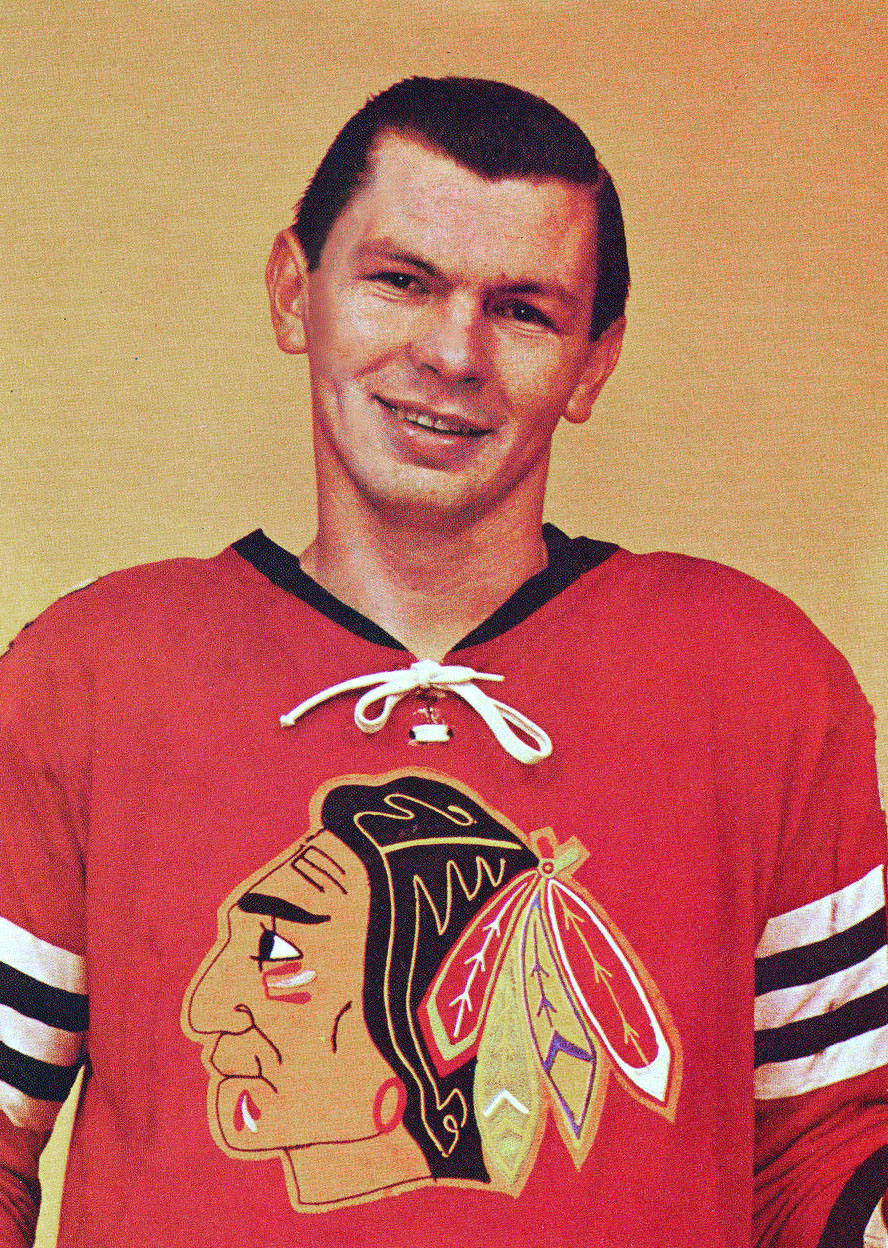
Stan Mikita is the team leader in games played for the Blackhawks with 1,396.

Player	Seasons played with team	Games played	Notes	Ref(s)
Stan Mikita†	22	1,396	Played entire career with the team (1958–1980)	
Duncan Keith†	16	1,192	(2005–2021)	
Patrick Kane	16	1,161	(2007–2023)	
Brent Seabrook	15	1,114	Played entire career with the team (2005–2020)	
Jonathan Toews	15	1,067	(2007–2023); Missed the entire 2020–21 season due to illness.	
Bobby Hull†	15	1,036	(1957–1972)	
Eric Nesterenko	16	1,013	(1956–1972)	
Bob Murray	15	1,008	Played entire career with the team (1975–1990)	
Doug Wilson†	14	938	(1977–1991)	
Dennis Hull	13	904	(1964–1977)	

=== Colorado Avalanche ===
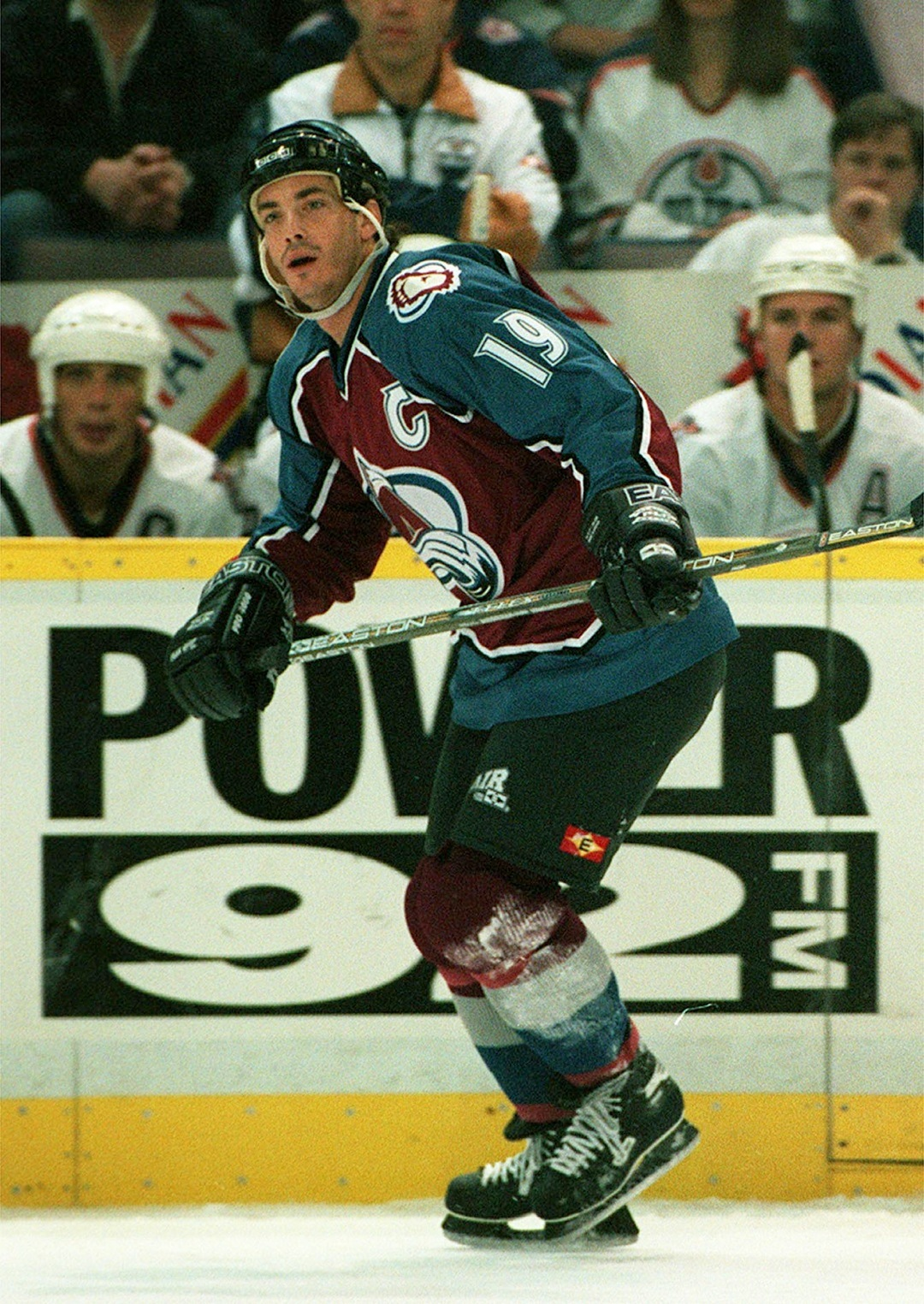
Joe Sakic played his entire career with the Nordiques/Avalanche, finishing with 1,378 games played.

Player	Seasons played with team	Games played	Notes	Ref(s)
Joe Sakic†	20	1,378	Quebec (1988–1995); Colorado (1995–2009); Played entire career with the team	
Milan Hejduk	14	1,020	Played entire career with the team (1998–2013)	
Adam Foote	17	967	Quebec (1991–1995); Colorado (1995–2004, 2008–2011); Played with the team on two separate occasions.	
Nathan MacKinnon↑	13	947	Played entire career with the team (2013–present)	
Michel Goulet	11	813	(1979–1990)	
Gabriel Landeskog↑	12	798	(2011–present); Missed the 2022–23 through 2024–25 seasons due to injury.	
Peter Stastny†	10	737	(1980–1990)	
Erik Johnson	14	731	(2011–2023, 2025); Played with the team on two separate occasions.	
Alain Cote	10	696	Played entire career with the team (1979–1989)	
Cody McLeod	10	659	(2007–2017)	

The franchise was originally known as the Quebec Nordiques from 1979 to 1995.

=== Columbus Blue Jackets ===
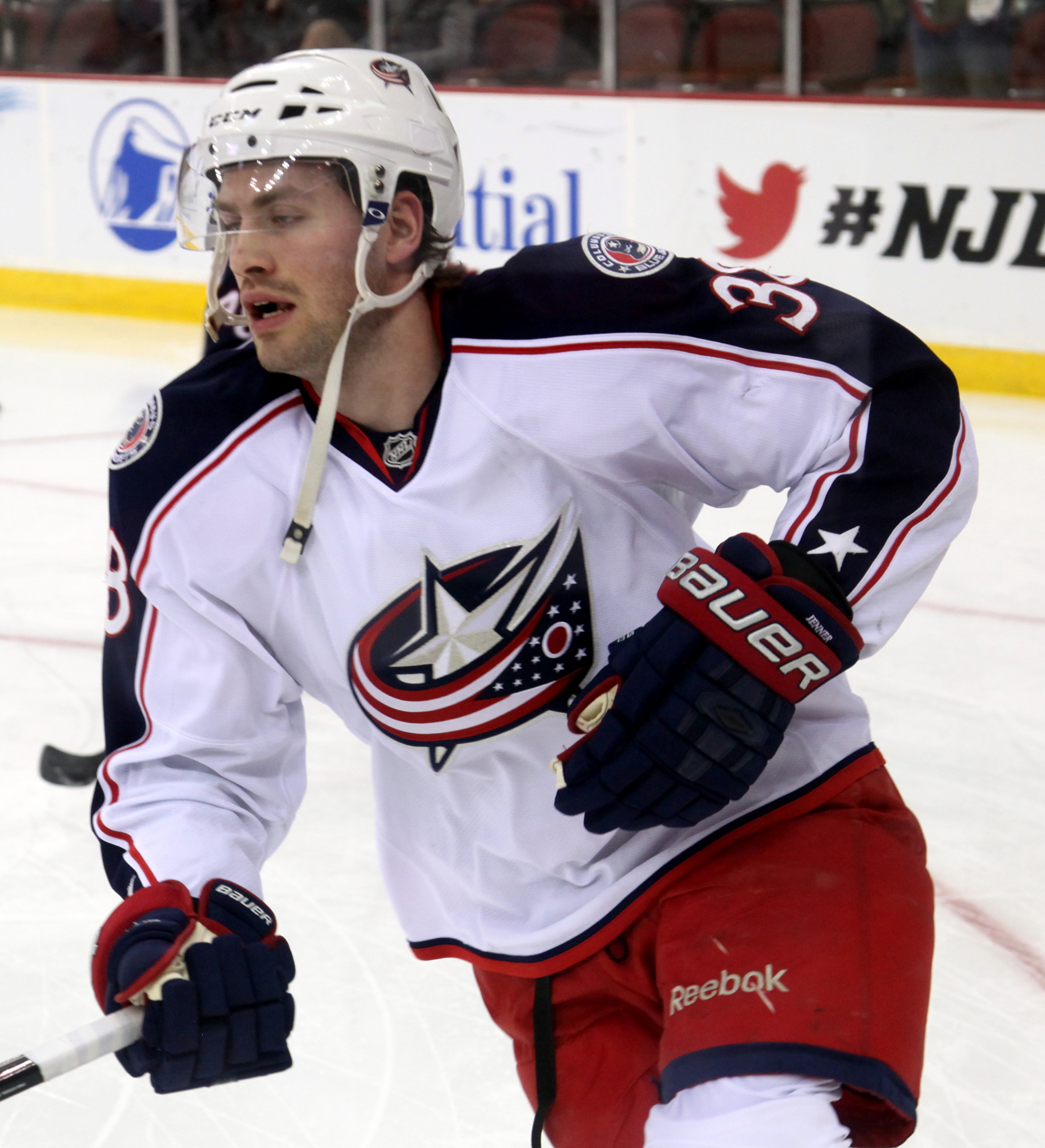
Boone Jenner holds the record for the most games played with the Blue Jackets.

Player	Seasons played with team	Games played	Notes	Ref(s)
Boone Jenner↑	13	807	(2013–present)	
Rick Nash	9	674	(2002–2012)	
Zach Werenski↑	10	639	Played entire career with the team (2016–present)	
Cam Atkinson	10	627	(2011–2021)	
Nick Foligno	9	599	(2013–2021)	
David Savard	10	597	(2011–2021)	
Fedor Tyutin	8	553	(2008–2016)	
David Vyborny	7	543	Played entire career with the team (2000–2008)	
Jared Boll	9	518	(2007–2016)	
Rostislav Klesla	10	515	(2000–2011)	

=== Dallas Stars ===
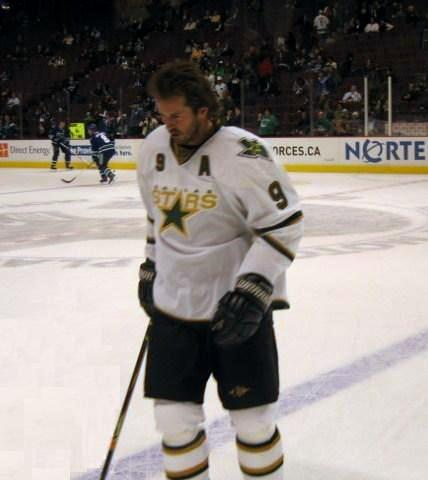
Mike Modano, the leading goal scorer for American born players, played 1,459 games with the Stars franchise.

Player	Seasons played with team	Games played	Notes	Ref(s)
Mike Modano†	20	1,459	Minnesota North Stars (1989–1993); Dallas (1993–2010); Debuted during the 1989 Stanley Cup playoffs First regular season game came in the 1989–90 season	
Jamie Benn↑	17	1,251	Played entire career with the team (2009–present)	
Neal Broten	16	992	Minnesota North Stars (1981–1993); Dallas (1993–1995, 1997); Played with the team on two separate occasions.	
Jere Lehtinen	14	875	Played entire career with the team (1995–2010)	
Sergei Zubov†	12	839	(1996–2008)	
Brenden Morrow	13	835	(1999–2013)	
Derian Hatcher	12	827	(1991–2003)	
Tyler Seguin↑	12	786	(2013–present)	
Esa Lindell	11	765	Played entire career with the team (2016–present)	
Curt Giles	12	760	Played with the team on two separate occasions (1979–1986, 1987–1991)	

The franchise was originally known as the Minnesota North Stars from 1967 to 1993, and additionally merged with the Cleveland Barons (themselves originally known as the California/Oakland (Golden) Seals from 1967 to 1976) in 1978.

=== Detroit Red Wings ===
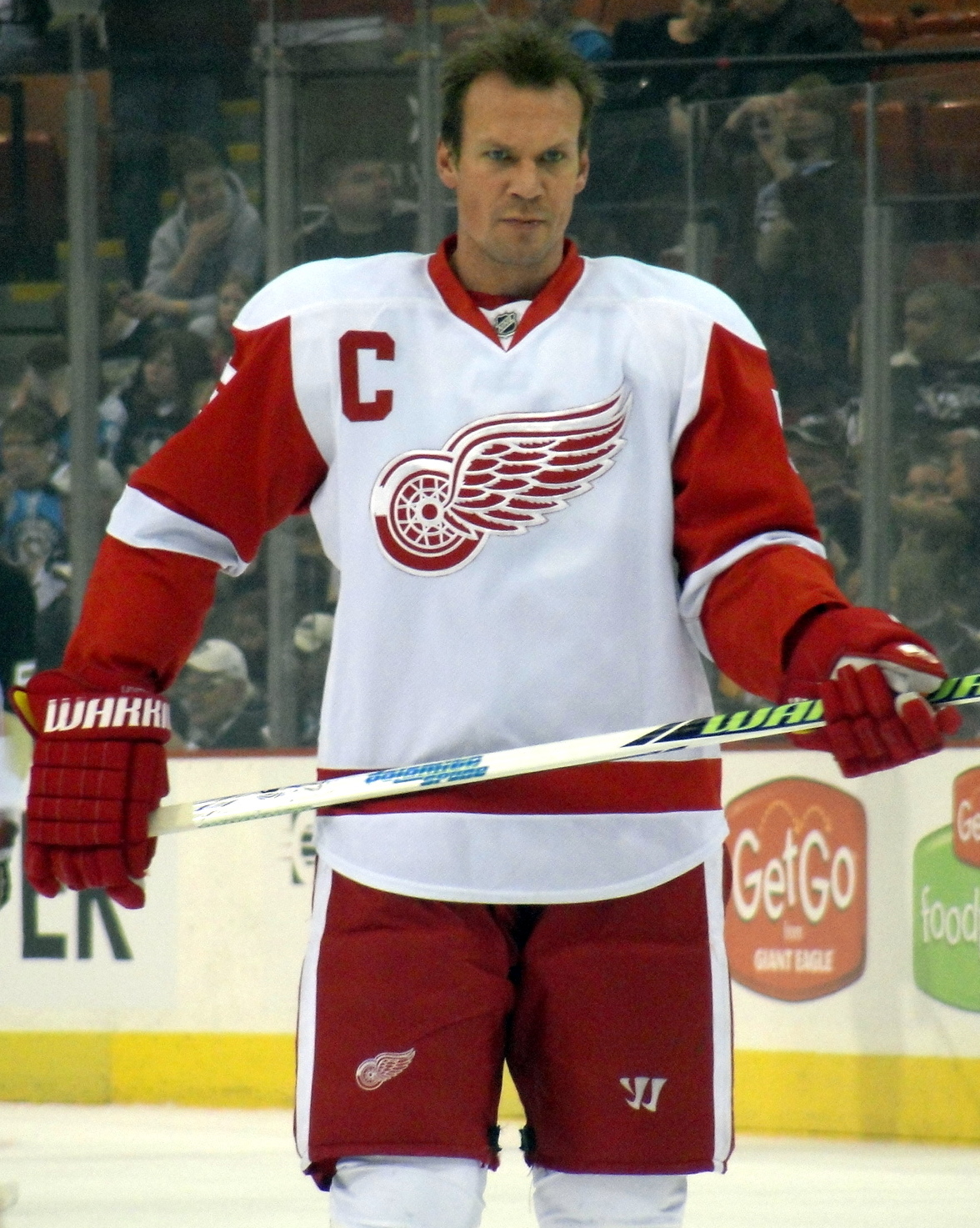
Nicklas Lidstrom holds the all-time record for the most career games played with one franchise at 1,564.

Player	Seasons played with team	Games played	Notes	Ref(s)
Gordie Howe†	25	1,687	Most games played with one franchise (1946–1971)	
Nicklas Lidstrom†	20	1,564	Played entire career with the team (1991–2012); Most games played of any single-franchise career.	
Alex Delvecchio†	24	1,549	Played entire career with the team (1950–1974)	
Steve Yzerman†	22	1,514	Played entire career with the team (1983–2006)	
Kris Draper	17	1,137	(1993–2011)	
Henrik Zetterberg	15	1,082	Played entire career with the team (2002–2018)	
Tomas Holmstrom	15	1,026	Played entire career with the team (1996–2012)	
Marcel Pronovost†	15	983	(1950–1965)	
Pavel Datsyuk	14	953	Played entire career with the team (2001–2016)	
Niklas Kronwall	15	953	Played entire career with the team (2003–2019)	

=== Edmonton Oilers ===
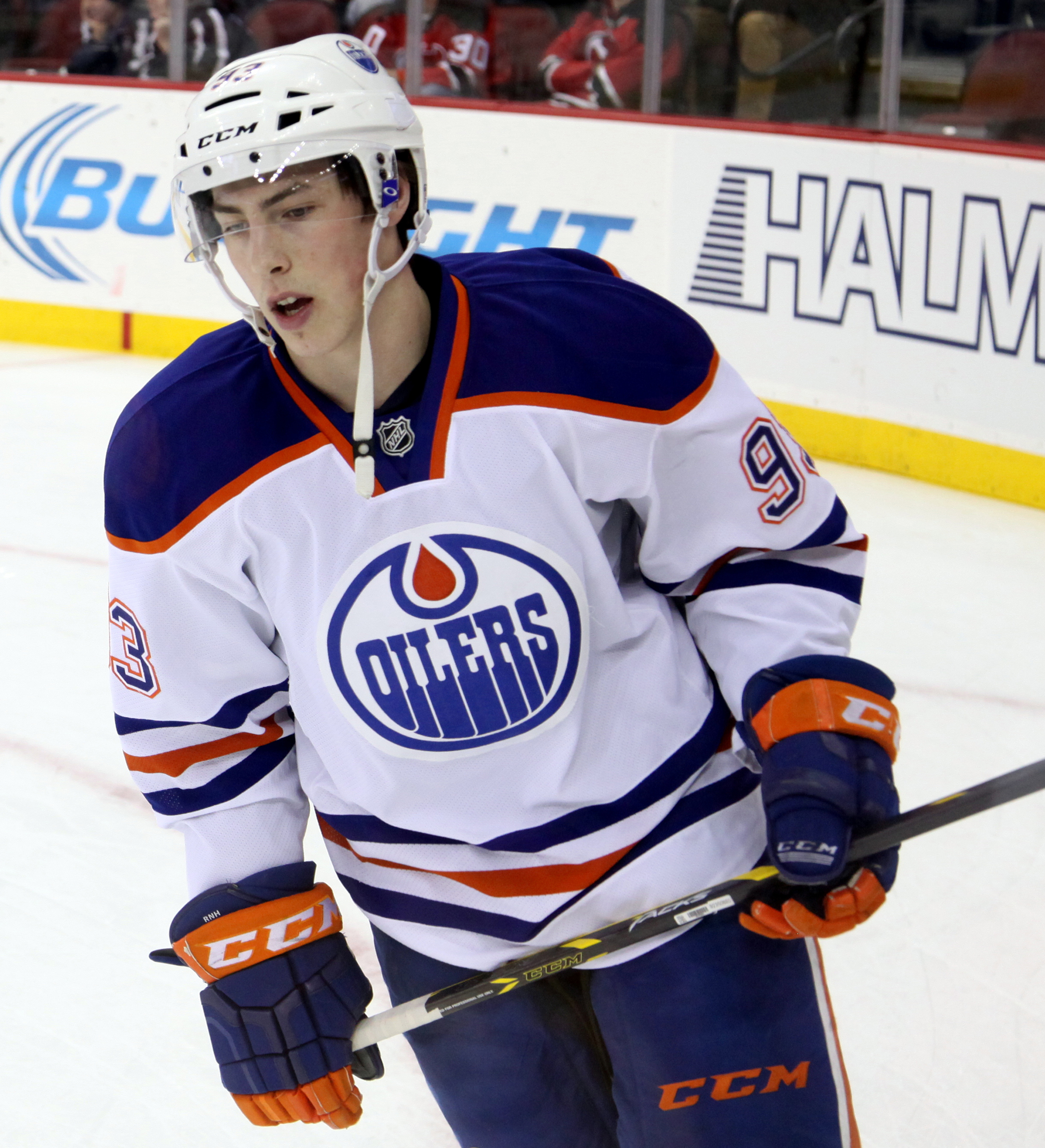
Ryan Nugent-Hopkins is the current leader for games played with the Oilers.

Player	Seasons played with team	Games played	Notes	Ref(s)
Ryan Nugent-Hopkins↑	16	1,042	Played entire career with the team (2011–present)	
Kevin Lowe†	15	1,037	Played with the team on two separate occasions (1979–1992, 1996–1998)	
Ryan Smyth	15	971	Played with the team on two separate occasions (1995–2007, 2011–2014)	
Leon Draisaitl↑	12	857	Played entire career with the team (2014–present)	
Mark Messier†	12	851	(1979–1991)	
Glenn Anderson†	12	845	Played with the team on two separate occasions (1980–1991, 1995–1996)	
Darnell Nurse↑	12	797	Played entire career with the team (2014–2026)	
Shawn Horcoff	12	796	(2000–2013)	
Kelly Buchberger	12	795	(1987–1999)	
Connor McDavid↑	11	793	Played entire career with the team (2015–present)	

=== Florida Panthers ===
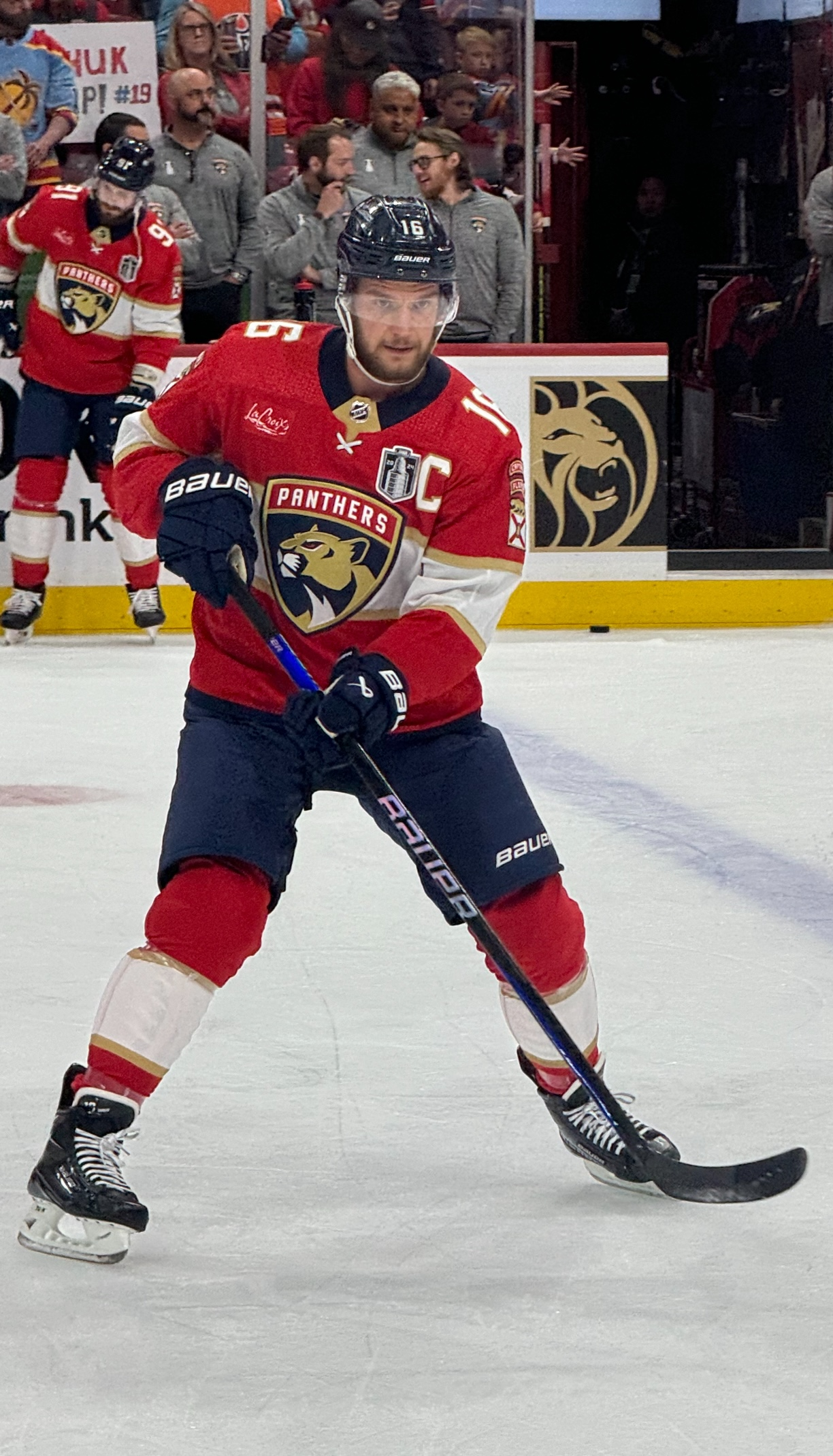
Aleksander Barkov is the current leader in games played with the Panthers.

Player	Seasons played with team	Games played	Notes	Ref(s)
Aleksander Barkov↑	12	804	Played entire career with the team (2013–present)	
Aaron Ekblad↑	12	804	Played entire career with the team (2014–present)	
Jonathan Huberdeau	10	671	(2013–2022)	
Stephen Weiss	11	654	(2002–2013)	
Dmitry Kulikov↑	10	625	Played with the team on two separate occasions (2009–2016, 2023–present)	
Radek Dvorak	9	613	Played with the team on two separate occasions (1995–2000, 2007–2011)	
Robert Svehla	8	573	(1995–2002)	
Roberto Luongo†	11	572	Played with the team on two separate occasions (2000–2006, 2014–2019)	
Olli Jokinen	7	567	(2000–2008)	
Scott Mellanby	8	552	(1993–2001)	

=== Los Angeles Kings ===
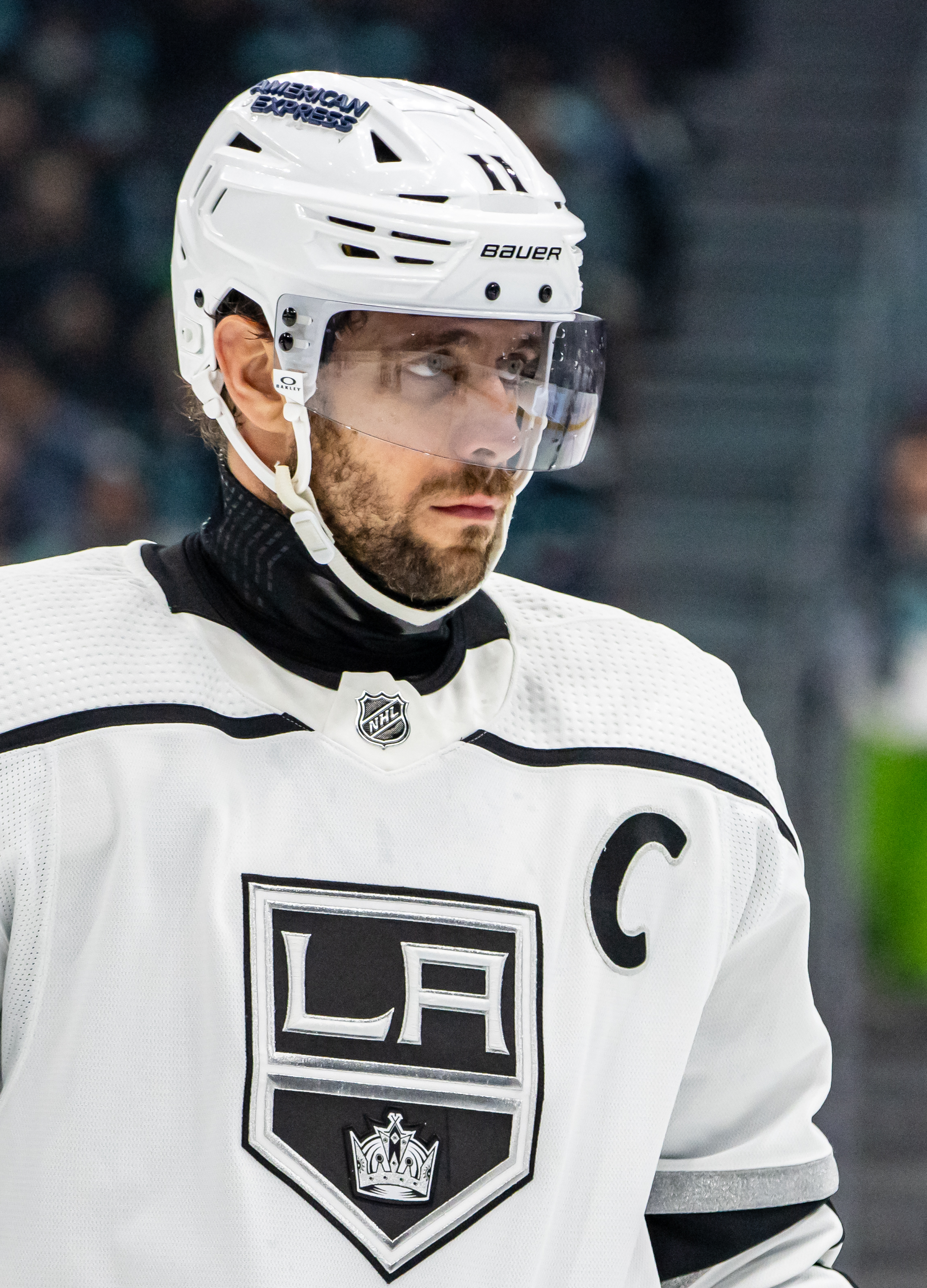
Anze Kopitar is the all time leader in games played for the Kings.

Player	Seasons played with team	Games played	Notes	Ref(s)
Anze Kopitar	20	1,521	Played entire career with the team (2006–2026)	
Dustin Brown	18	1,296	Played entire career with the team (2003–2022)	
Drew Doughty↑	18	1,279	Played entire career with the team (2008–present)	
Dave Taylor	17	1,111	Played entire career with the team (1977–1994)	
Luc Robitaille†	14	1,077	Played with the team on three separate occasions (1986–1994, 1997–2001, 2003–2006)	
Marcel Dionne	12	921	(1975–1987)	
Trevor Lewis	14	816	Played with the team on two separate occasions (2008–2020, 2023–2025)	
Rob Blake†	13	804	Played with the team on two separate occasions (1990–2001, 2006–2008)	
Mattias Norstrom	11	780	(1996–2007)	
Jonathan Quick	17	743	(2007–2023)	

=== Minnesota Wild ===
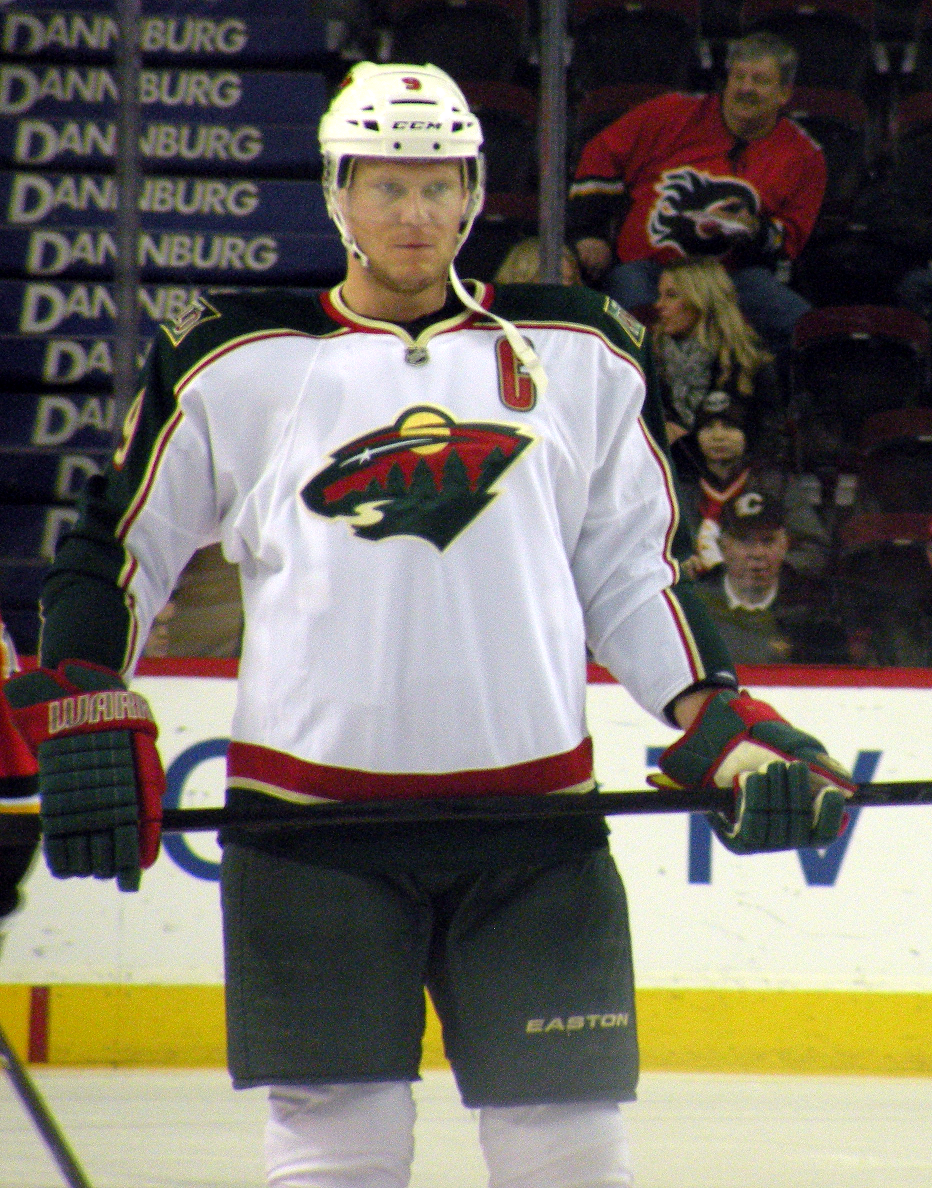
Mikko Koivu became the first player to play 1,000 games for the Minnesota Wild.

Player	Seasons played with team	Games played	Notes	Ref(s)
Mikko Koivu	15	1,028	(2005–2020)	
Jared Spurgeon↑	16	1,013	Played entire career with the team (2010–present)	
Jonas Brodin↑	14	915	Played entire career with the team (2013–present)	
Nick Schultz	10	743	(2001–2012)	
Ryan Suter	9	656	(2012–2021)	
Joel Eriksson Ek↑	10	616	Played entire career with the team (2016–present)	
Matt Dumba	10	598	(2013–2023)	
Marcus Foligno↑	9	585	(2017–present)	
Pierre-Marc Bouchard	10	565	(2002–2013)	
Zach Parise	9	558	(2012–2021)	

=== Montreal Canadiens ===
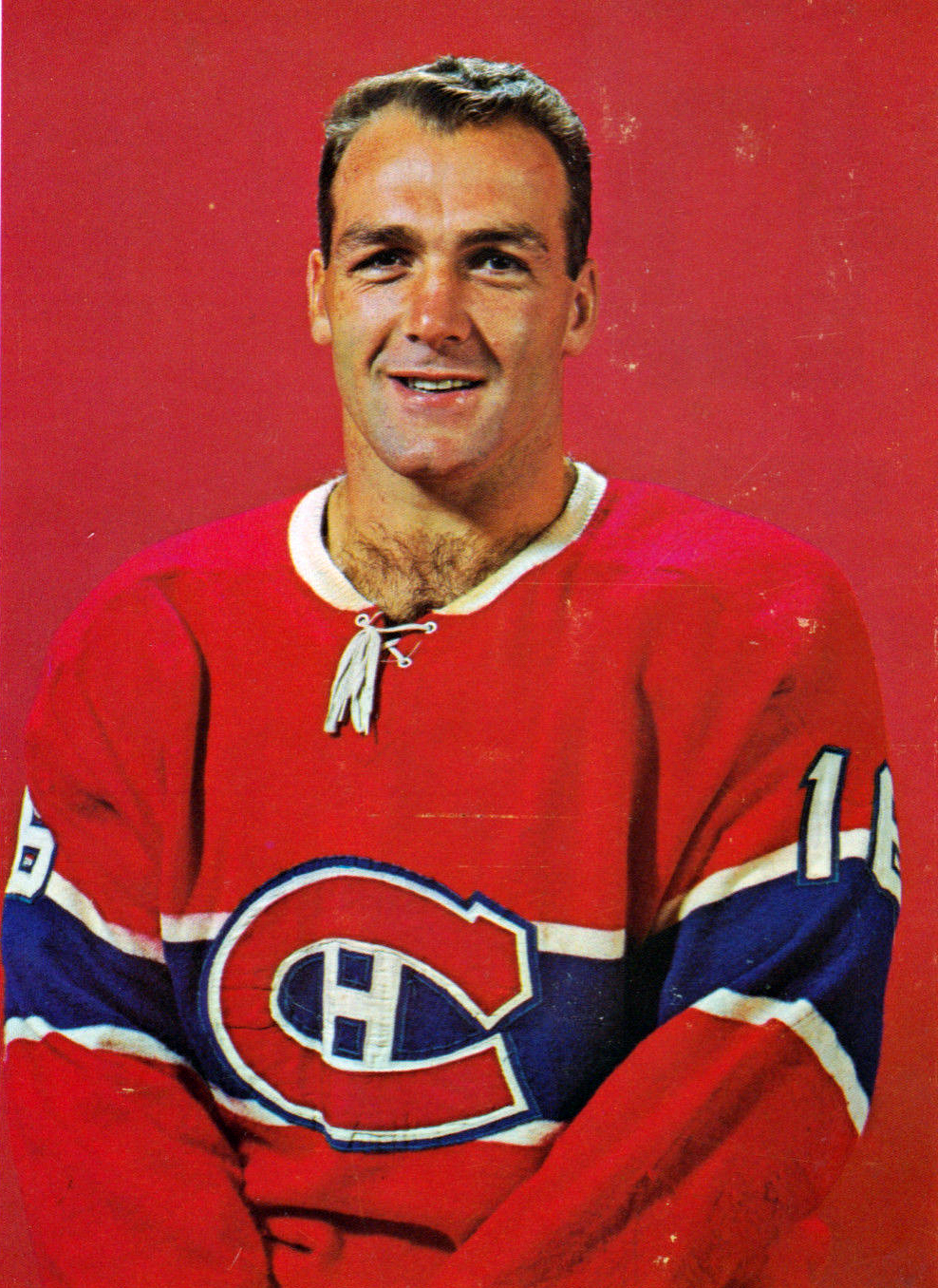
11-time Stanley Cup champion Henri Richard holds the record for the most games played with the Canadiens.

Player	Seasons played with team	Games played	Notes	Ref(s)
Henri Richard†	20	1,258	Played entire career with the team (1955–1975)	
Larry Robinson†	17	1,202	(1972–1989)	
Bob Gainey†	16	1,160	Played entire career with the team (1973–1989)	
Jean Beliveau†	20	1,125	Played entire career with the team (1950–51, 1952–1971)	
Claude Provost	15	1,005	Played entire career with the team (1955–1970)	
Andrei Markov	16	990	Played entire career with the team (2000–2017)	
Tomas Plekanec	15	984	Played with the team on two separate occasions (2003–2018, 2018)	
Maurice Richard†	18	978	Played entire career with the team (1942–1960)	
Yvan Cournoyer†	16	968	Played entire career with the team (1963–1978)	
Guy Lafleur†	14	961	(1971–1984)	

=== Nashville Predators ===
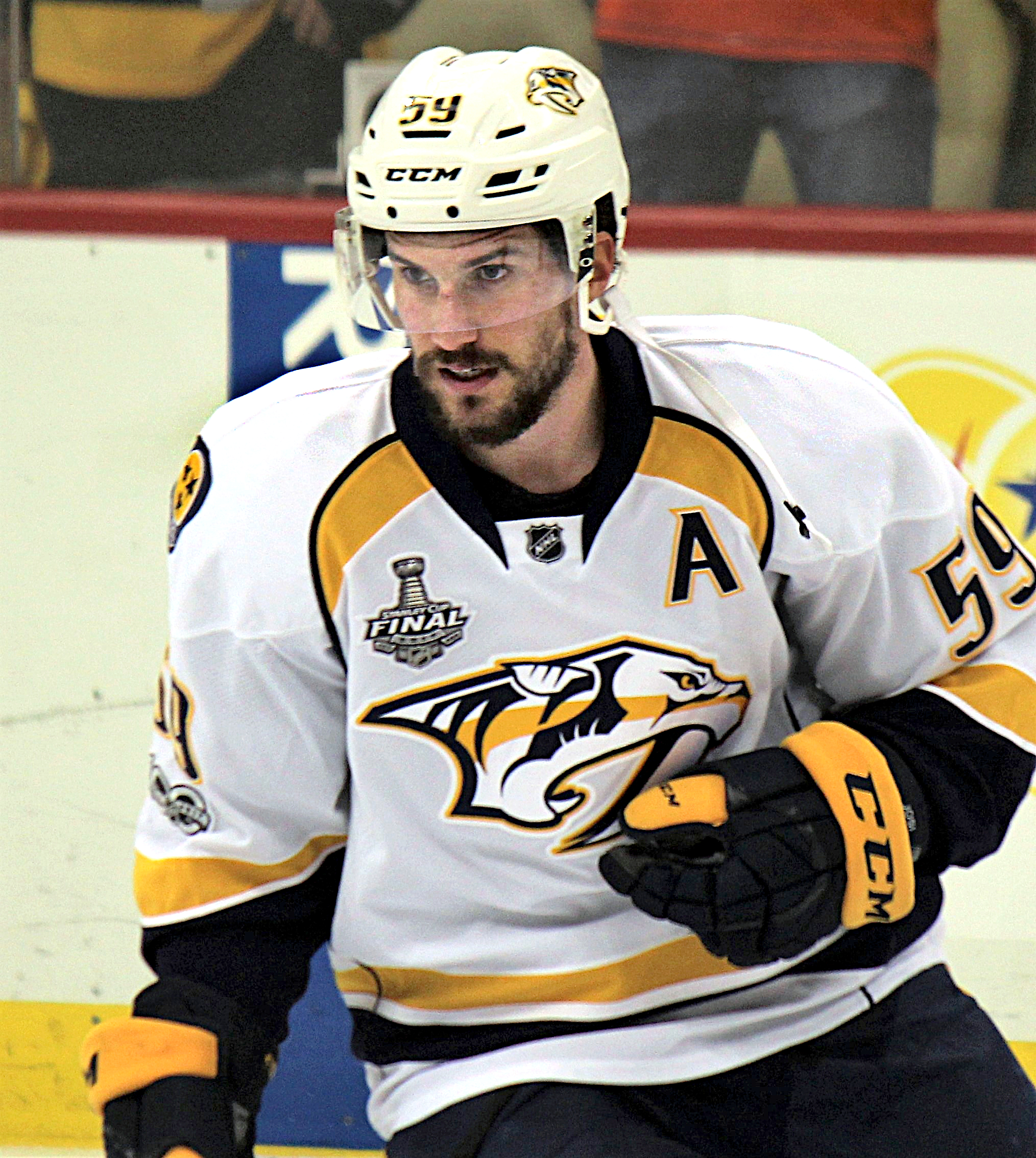
Roman Josi is the current leader in games played with the Predators.

Player	Seasons played with team	Games played	Notes	Ref(s)
Roman Josi↑	15	1,031	Played entire career with the team (2011–present)	
David Legwand	15	956	(1999–2014)	
Filip Forsberg↑	14	861	Played entire career with the team (2013–present)	
Shea Weber	11	763	(2006–2016)	
Martin Erat	11	723	(2001–2013)	
Mattias Ekholm	12	719	(2011–2023)	
Colton Sissons	12	690	(2014–2025)	
Pekka Rinne	16	683	Played entire career with the team (2005–2021)	
Craig Smith	9	661	(2011–2020)	
Dan Hamhuis	8	600	Played with the team on two separate occasions (2003–2010, 2018–2020)	

=== New Jersey Devils ===
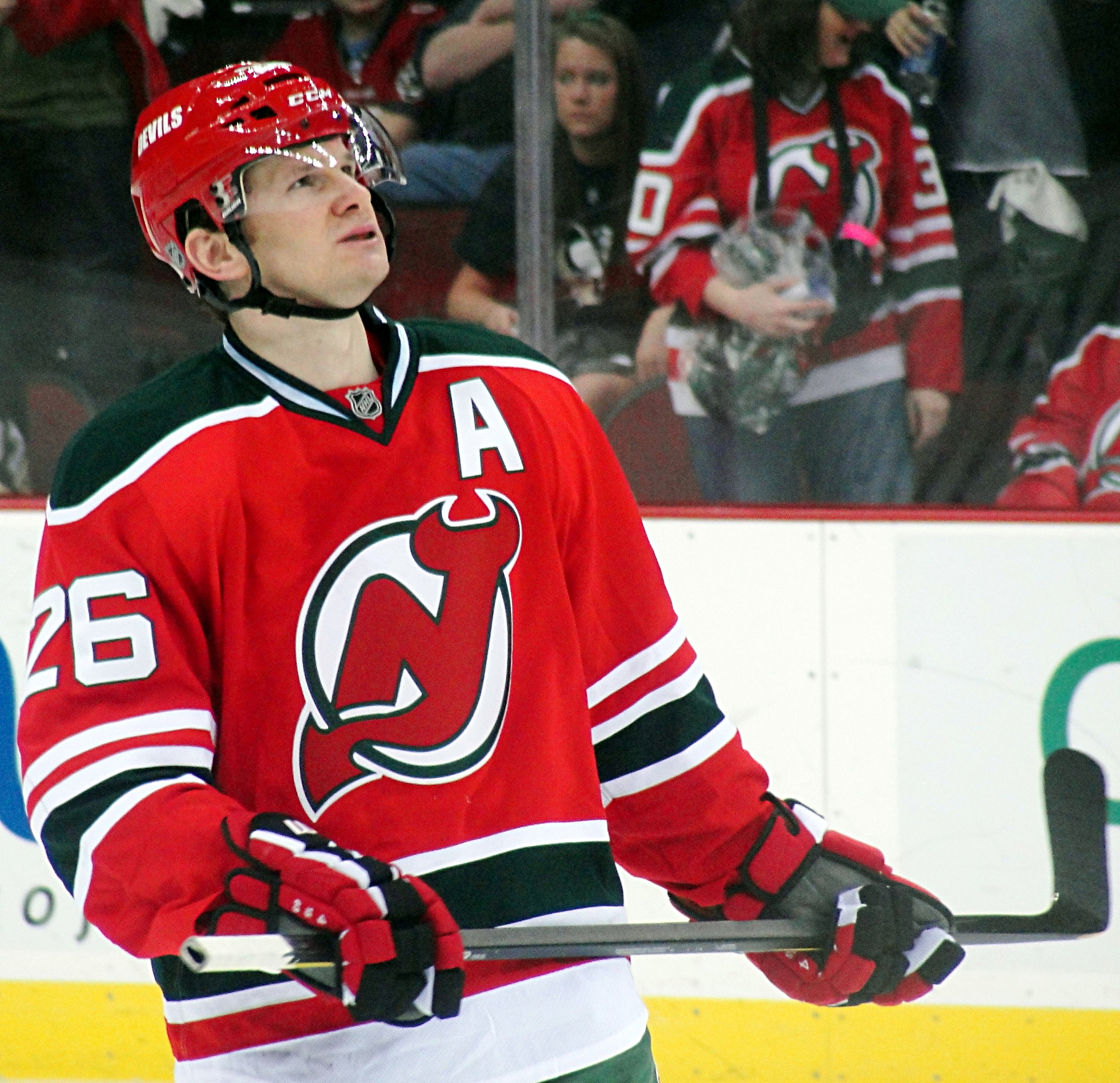
Patrik Elias played the second most games with the Devils, sitting at 1,259.

Player	Seasons played with team	Games played	Notes	Ref(s)
Ken Daneyko	20	1,283	Played entire career with the team (1983–2003)	
Martin Brodeur†	21	1,259	(1991–2014)	
Patrik Elias	20	1,240	Played entire career with the team (1995–2016)	
Travis Zajac	15	1,024	(2005–2020)	
Scott Stevens†	12	956	(1991–2004)	
John MacLean	14	934	(1983–1997)	
Andy Greene	14	923	(2007–2020)	
Scott Niedermayer†	13	892	(1991–2004)	
Jay Pandolfo	13	819	(1996–2010)	
Bobby Holik	11	786	(1992–2002)	

The franchise was previously known as the Kansas City Scouts from 1974 to 1976, and the Colorado Rockies from 1976 to 1982.

=== New York Islanders ===
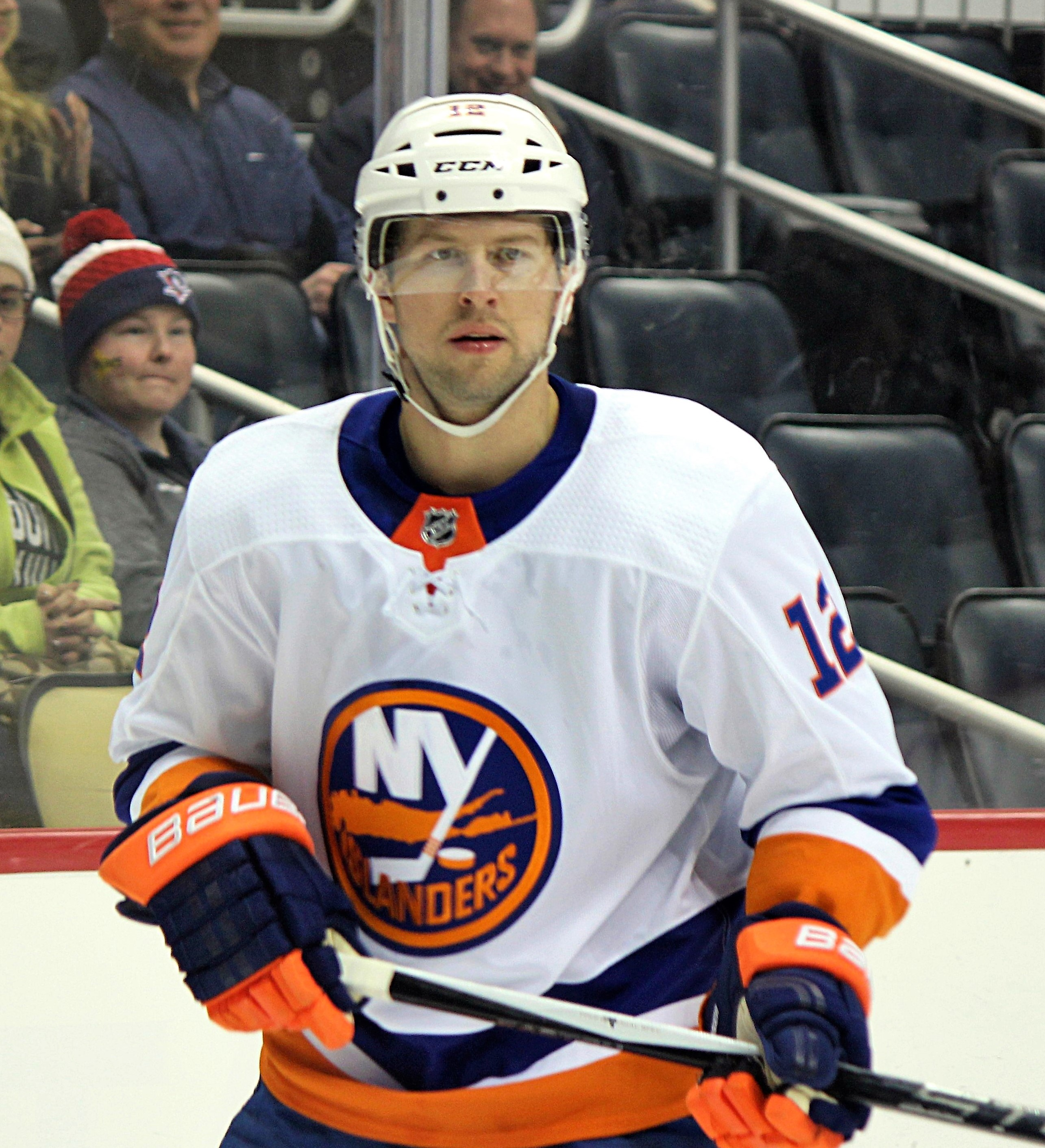
Josh Bailey is the most recent Islander to play 1,000 games with the team.

Player	Seasons played with team	Games played	Notes	Ref(s)
Bryan Trottier†	15	1,123	(1975–1990)	
Denis Potvin†	15	1,060	Played entire career with the team (1973–1988)	
Josh Bailey	15	1,057	Played entire career with the team (2008–2023)	
Casey Cizikas↑	15	977	Played entire career with the team (2012–present)	
Anders Lee↑	14	922	Played entire career with the team (2013–present)	
Brock Nelson	12	901	(2013–2025)	
Bob Nystrom	14	900	Played entire career with the team (1972–1986)	
Clark Gillies†	12	872	(1974–1986)	
Matt Martin	13	855	Played with the team on two separate occasions (2010–2016, 2018–2025)	
Bob Bourne	12	814	(1974–1986)	

=== New York Rangers ===
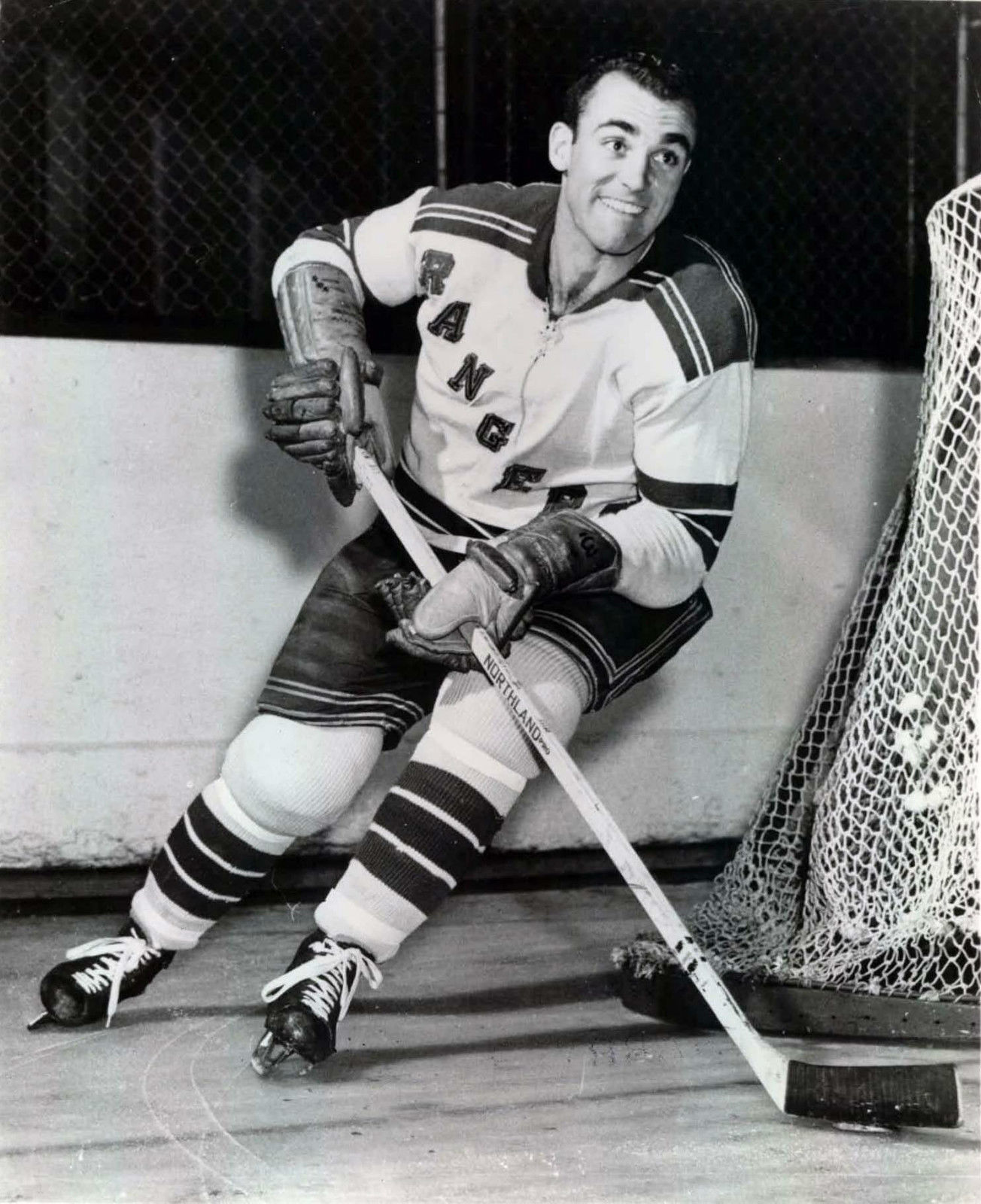
Harry Howell holds the record for the most games played with the Rangers, at 1,160.

Player	Seasons played with team	Games played	Notes	Ref(s)
Harry Howell†	17	1,160	(1952–1969)	
Brian Leetch†	17	1,129	(1987–2004)	
Rod Gilbert†	18	1,065	Played entire career with the team (1960–1978)	
Ron Greschner	16	981	Played entire career with the team (1974–1990)	
Walt Tkaczuk	14	945	Played entire career with the team (1968–1981)	
Marc Staal	13	892	(2007–2020)	
Henrik Lundqvist†	15	887	Played entire career with the team (2005–2020)	
Chris Kreider	13	883	(2013–2025)	
Jean Ratelle†	16	861	(1961–1975)	
Vic Hadfield	13	841	(1961–1974)	

=== Ottawa Senators ===
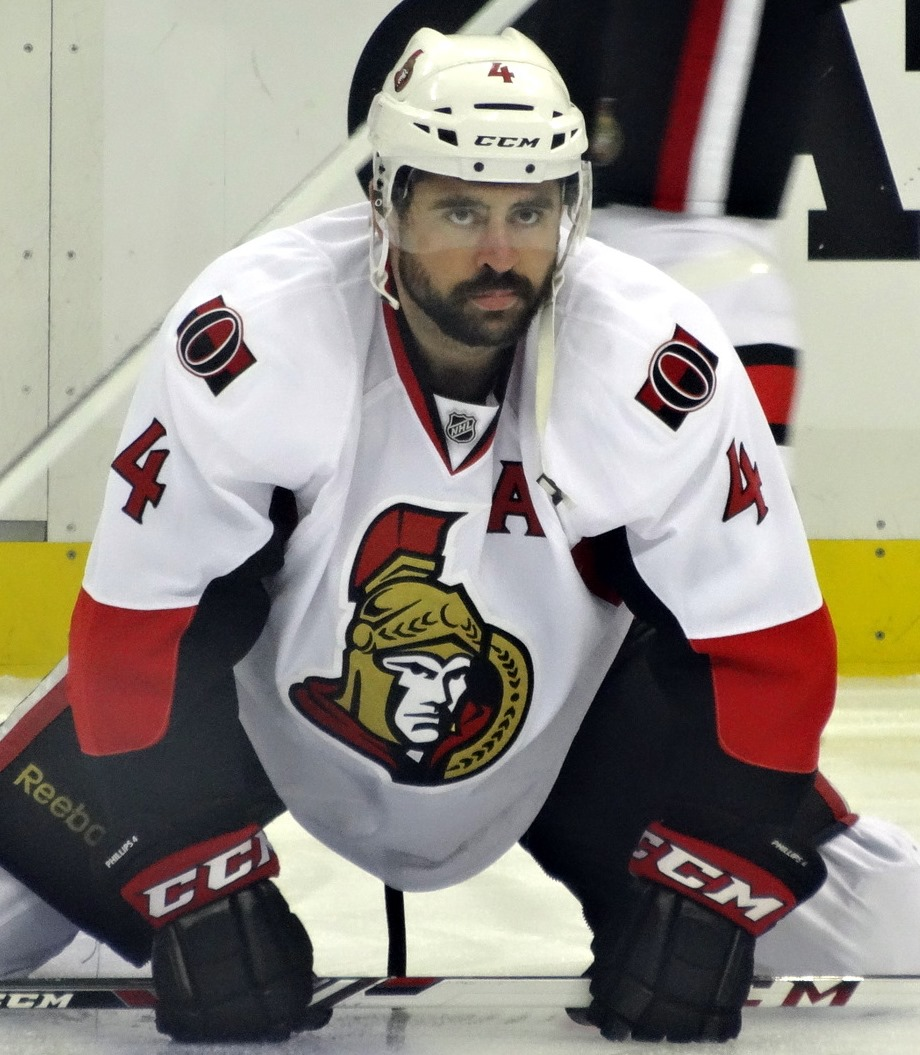
Chris Phillips holds the record for the most games played with the Senators at 1,179.

Player	Seasons played with team	Games played	Notes	Ref(s)
Chris Phillips	17	1,179	Played entire career with the team (1997–2015)	
Daniel Alfredsson†	17	1,178	(1995–2013)	
Chris Neil	15	1,026	Played entire career with the team (2001–2017)	
Wade Redden	11	838	(1996–2008)	
Radek Bonk	10	689	(1994–2004)	
Jason Spezza	11	686	(2002–2014)	
Mike Fisher	11	675	(1999–2011)	
Erik Karlsson	9	627	(2009–2018)	
Zack Smith	11	612	(2008–2019)	
Brady Tkachuk↑	8	573	Played entire career with the team (2018–2026)	

=== Philadelphia Flyers ===
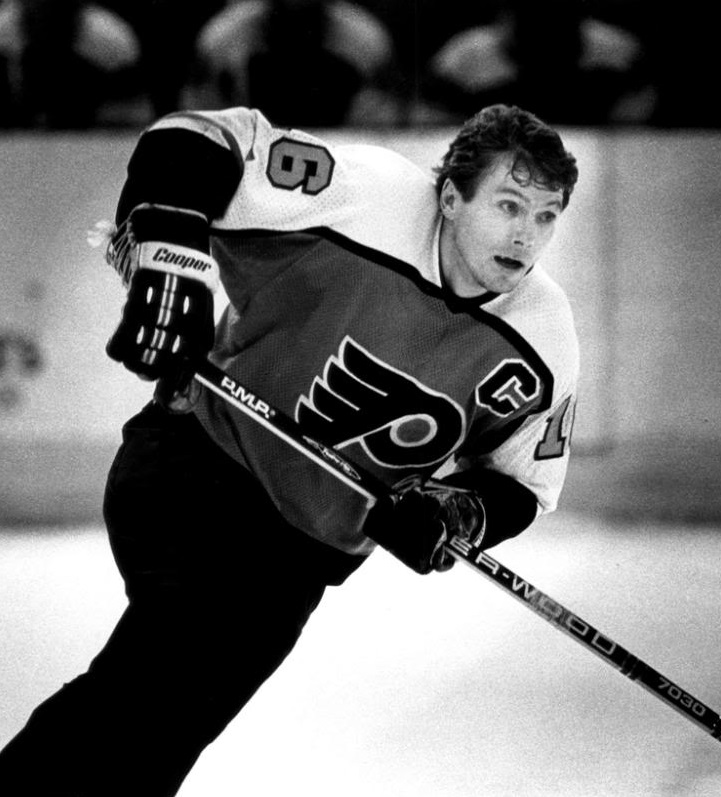
Bobby Clarke played all 1,144 games of his career with the Philadelphia Flyers.

Player	Seasons played with team	Games played	Notes	Ref(s)
Bobby Clarke†	15	1,144	Played entire career with the team (1969–1984)	
Claude Giroux	15	1,000	(2007–2022)	
Sean Couturier↑	14	952	Played entire career with the team (2011–present); Missed the entire 2022–23 season due to injury.	
Bill Barber†	12	903	(1972–1984)	
Brian Propp	11	790	(1979–1990)	
Chris Therien	11	753	(1994–2004)	
Joe Watson	11	746	(1967–1978)	
Bob Kelly	11	741	(1967–1978)	
Rick MacLeish	12	741	Played with the team on two separate occasions (1971–1981, 1983)	
Eric Desjardins	11	738	(1995–2006)	

=== Pittsburgh Penguins ===
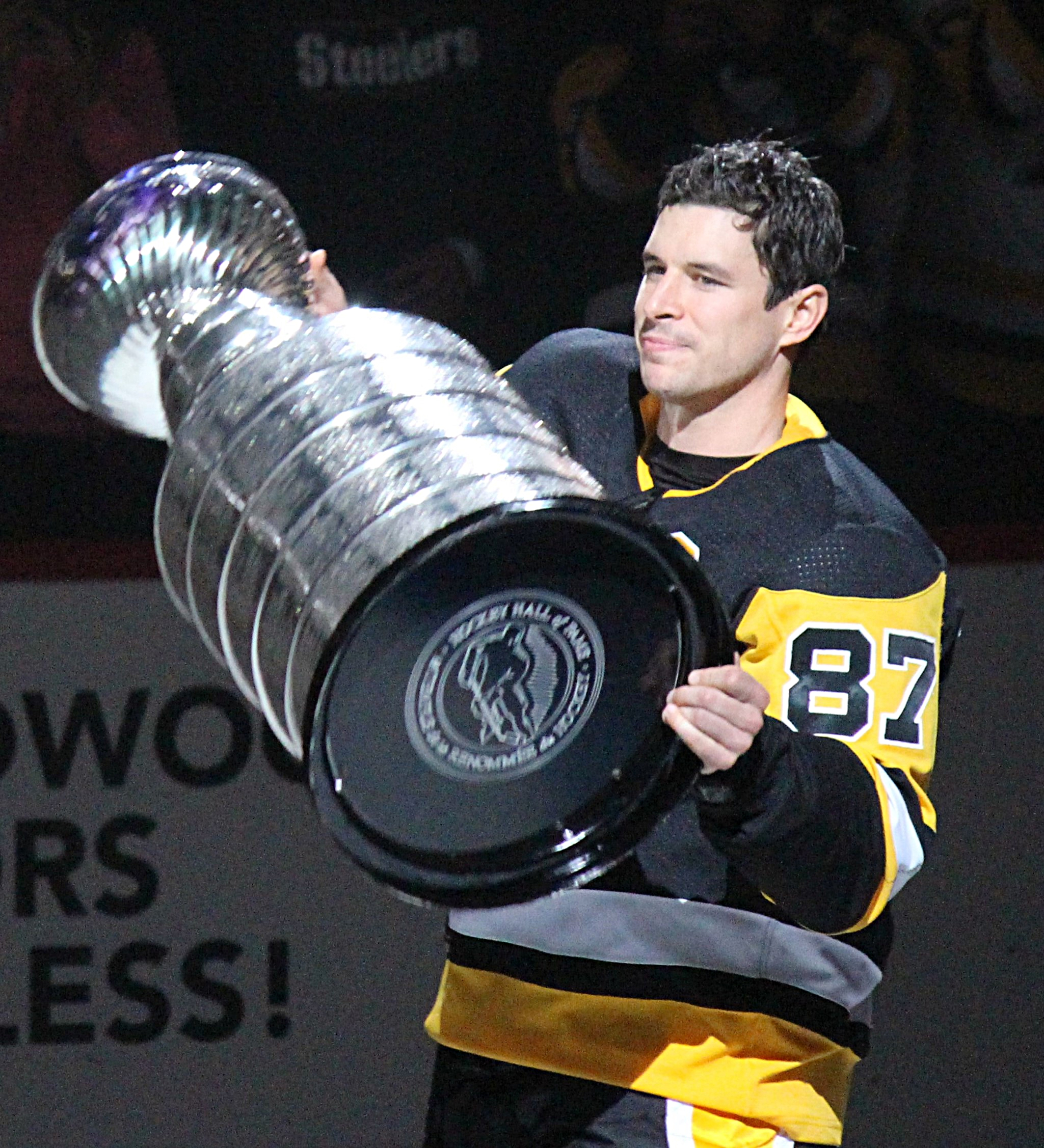
Sidney Crosby, the Penguins' current goal scorer and 3-time Stanley Cup champion, is the first to play 1,000 games for the team.

Player	Seasons played with team	Games played	Notes	Ref(s)
Sidney Crosby↑	21	1,419	Played entire career with the team (2005–present)	
Evgeni Malkin↑	20	1,268	Played entire career with the team (2006–present)	
Kris Letang↑	19	1,234	Played entire career with the team (2006–present)	
Mario Lemieux†	17	915	Played entire career with the team (1984–1997, 2000–2006); Missed the entire 1994–95 season due to illness.	
Jaromir Jagr	11	806	(1990–2001)	
Jean Pronovost	10	753	(1968–1978)	
Rick Kehoe	11	722	(1974–1984)	
Bryan Rust↑	12	711	Played entire career with the team (2014–present)	
Brooks Orpik	11	703	(2002–2014)	
Marc-Andre Fleury	13	691	(2003–2017)	

=== San Jose Sharks ===
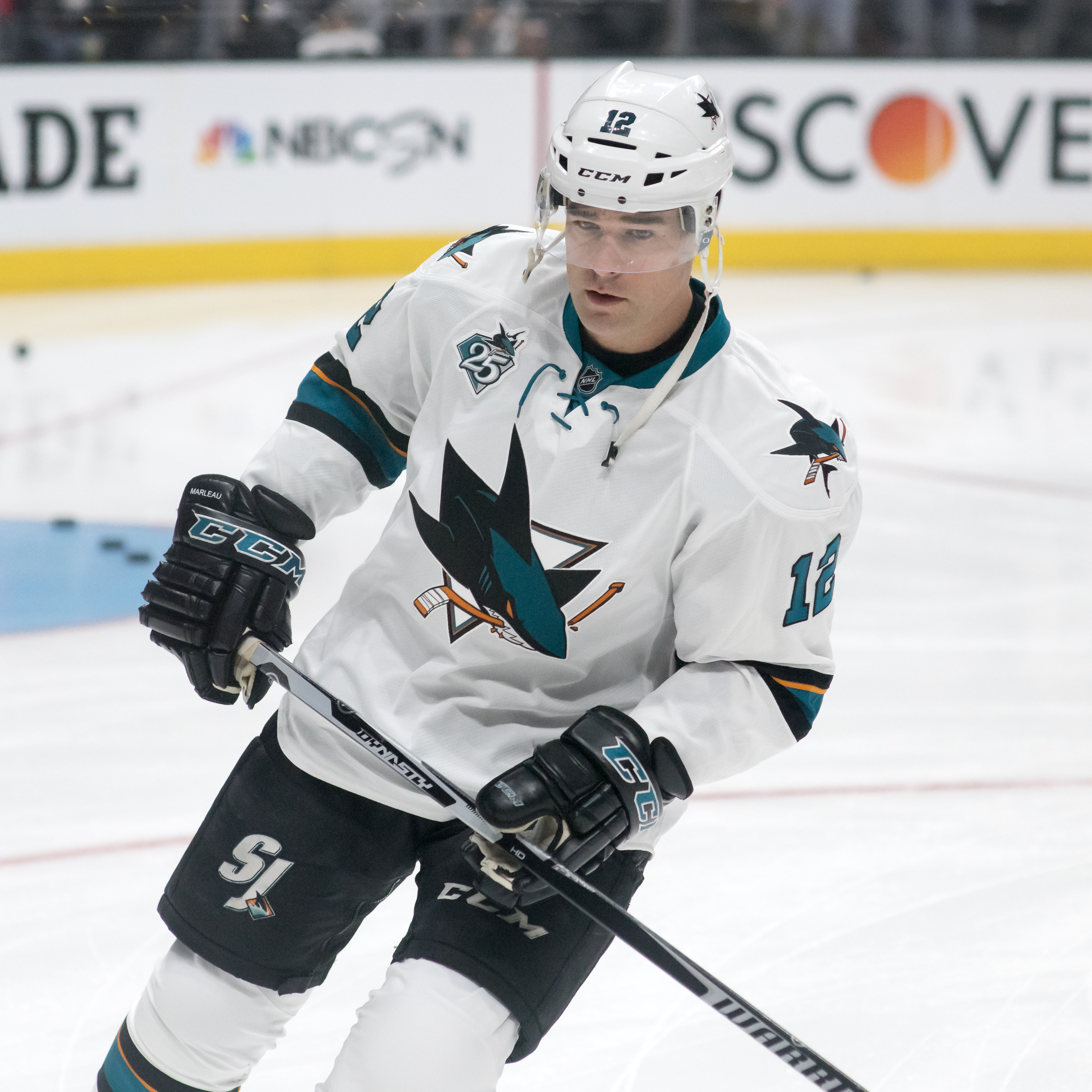
Patrick Marleau, the NHL's league leader in games played, spent most of his career with the Sharks, playing 1,607 games on three separate occasions.

Player	Seasons played with team	Games played	Notes	Ref(s)
Patrick Marleau	21	1,607	Played with the team on three separate occasions (1997–2017, 2019–2020, 2021)	
Marc-Edouard Vlasic	19	1,323	Played entire career with the team (2006–2025)	
Joe Thornton†	15	1,104	(2005–2020)	
Joe Pavelski	13	963	(2006–2019)	
Logan Couture	15	933	Played entire career with the team (2009–2024)	
Brent Burns	11	798	(2011–2022)	
Tomas Hertl	11	712	(2013–2024)	
Mike Rathje	11	671	(1993–2004)	
Scott Hannan	11	626	Played with the team on two separate occasions (1998–2007, 2013–2015)	
Justin Braun	9	607	(2010–2019)	

=== Seattle Kraken ===
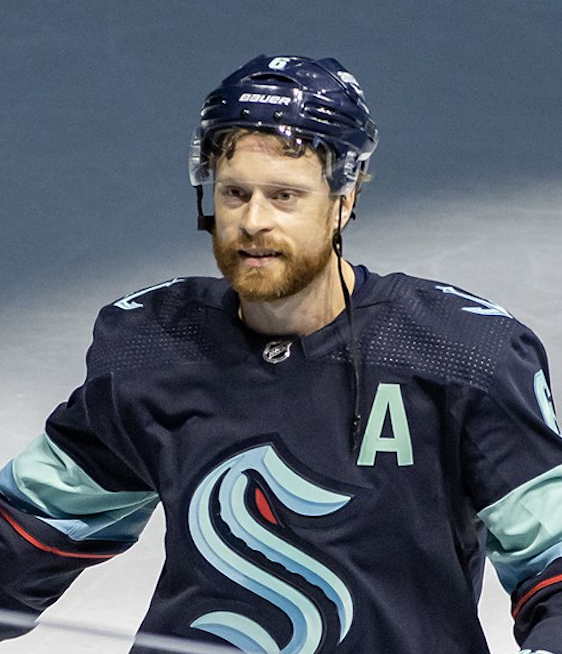
Adam Larsson in 2023.

Player	Seasons played with team	Games played	Notes	Ref(s)
Adam Larsson↑	5	408	(2021–present)	
Jamie Oleksiak↑	5	389	(2021–2026)	
Jared McCann↑	5	367	(2021–present)	
Jordan Eberle↑	5	361	(2021–present)	
Vince Dunn↑	5	356	(2021–present)	
Matty Beniers↑	5	331	Played entire career with the team (2022–present)	
Jaden Schwartz↑	5	301	(2021–present)	
Eeli Tolvanen	4	288	(2022–present)	
Yanni Gourde	4	271	(2021–2025)	
Brandon Tanev	4	238	(2021–2025)	

=== St. Louis Blues ===
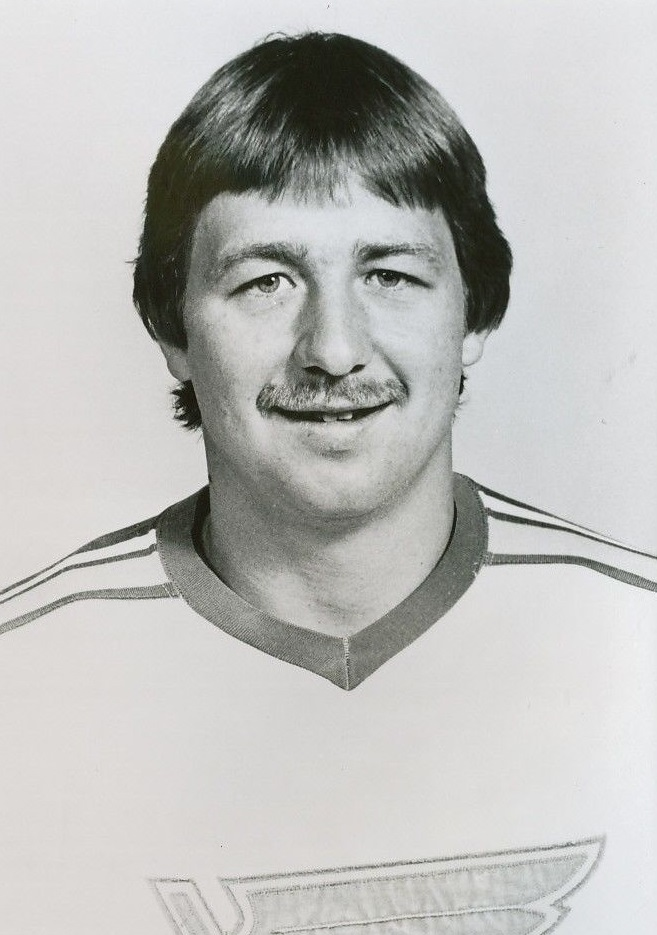
Bernie Federko played 927 of his 1,000 games with the St. Louis Blues, and is their all-time leader in games played,

Player	Seasons played with team	Games played	Notes	Ref(s)
Bernie Federko†	13	927	(1976–1989)	
Barret Jackman	13	803	(2002–2015)	
Brian Sutter	12	779	(1976–1988)	
Alexander Steen	12	765	(2008–2020)	
Alex Pietrangelo	12	758	(2008–2020)	
Brett Hull†	11	744	(1988–1998)	
David Backes	10	727	(2006–2016)	
Colton Parayko↑	10	723	Played entire career with the team (2015–present)	
Patrik Berglund	10	694	(2008–2018)	
David Perron	11	673	Played with the team on three separate occasions (2007–2013, 2016–2017, 2018–2022)	

=== Tampa Bay Lightning ===
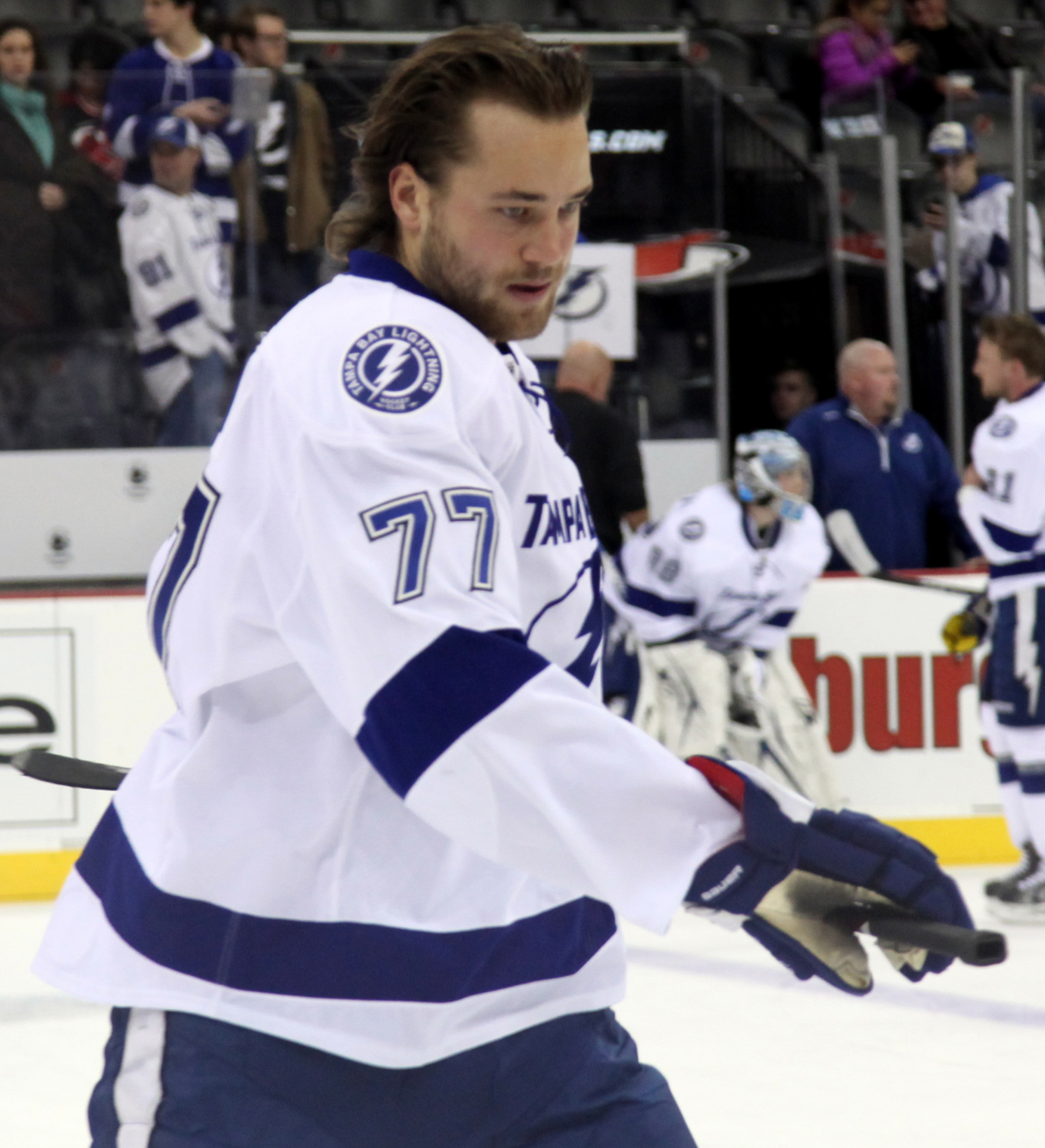
Victor Hedman is the Lightning's current leader in games played.

Player	Seasons played with team	Games played	Notes	Ref(s)
Victor Hedman↑	17	1,166	Played entire career with the team (2009–present)	
Steven Stamkos	16	1,082	(2008–2024)	
Vincent Lecavalier	14	1,037	(1998–2013)	
Martin St. Louis†	13	972	(2000–2014)	
Alex Killorn	11	805	(2013–2023)	
Nikita Kucherov↑	13	878	Played entire career with the team (2013–present)	
Pavel Kubina	10	662	Played with the team on two separate occasions (1998–2006, 2010–2012)	
Brayden Point↑	10	720	Played entire career with the team (2016–present)	
Ondrej Palat	10	628	(2013–2022)	
Tyler Johnson	9	589	(2013–2021)	

=== Toronto Maple Leafs ===
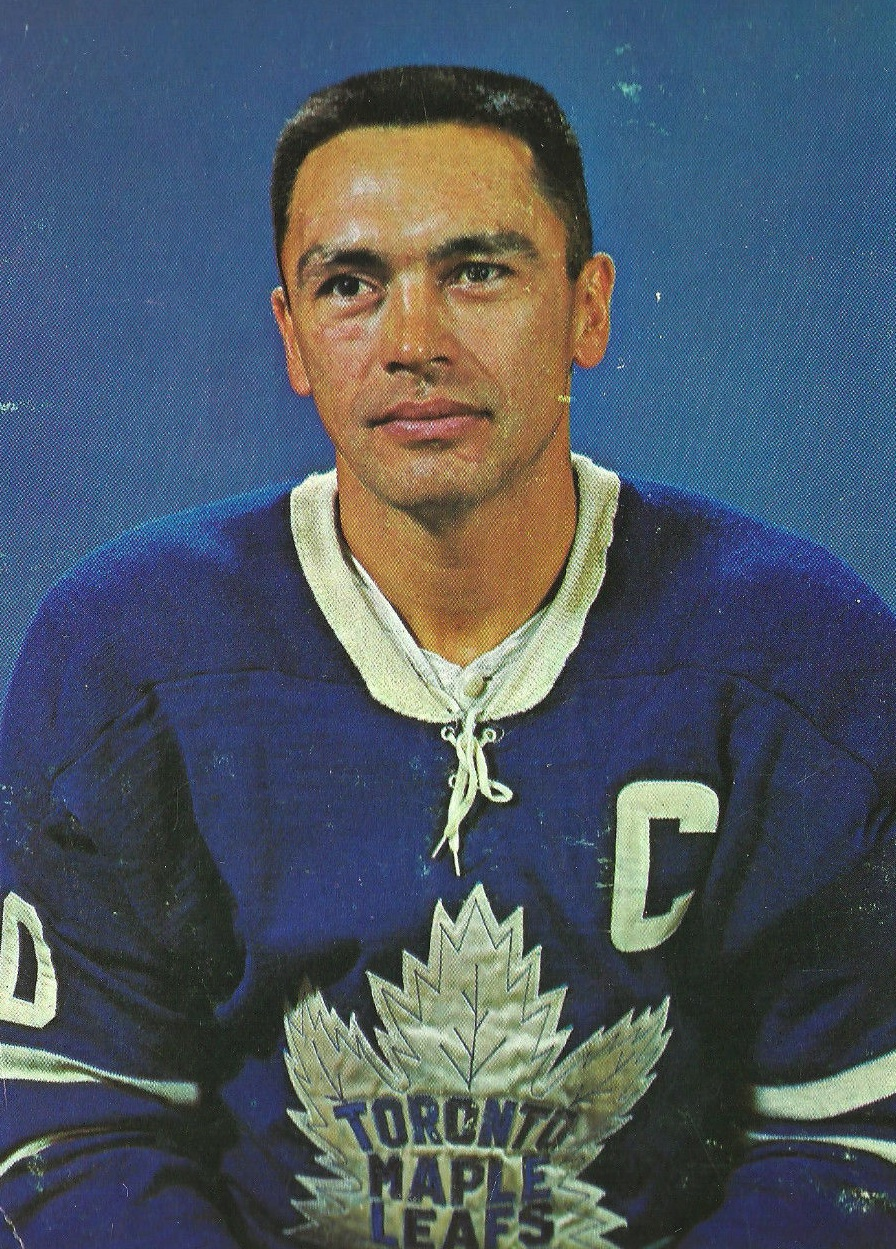
George Armstrong holds the record for the most games played with the Maple Leafs.

Player	Seasons played with team	Games played	Notes	Ref(s)
George Armstrong†	21	1,188	Played entire career with the team (1949–50, 1951–1971)	
Tim Horton†	20	1,184	(1949–1970)	
Borje Salming†	16	1,099	(1973–1989)	
Dave Keon†	15	1,062	(1960–1975)	
Ron Ellis	16	1,034	Played entire career with the team (1963–1975,1977–1981)	
Mats Sundin†	13	981	(1994–2008)	
Morgan Rielly↑	13	950	Played entire career with the team (2013–present)	
Bob Pulford†	14	947	(1956–1970)	
Tomas Kaberle	11	878	(1999–2011)	
Darryl Sittler†	12	844	(1970–1982)	

=== Vancouver Canucks ===
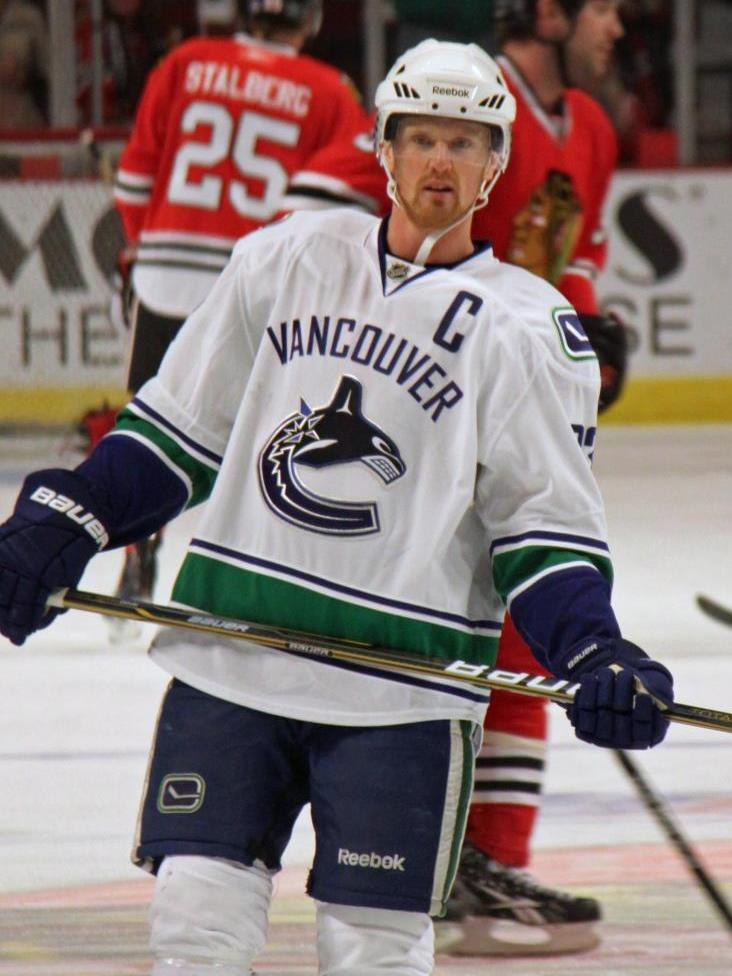
Henrik Sedin leads the Canucks with 1,330 games played.

Player	Seasons played with team	Games played	Notes	Ref(s)
Henrik Sedin†	17	1,330	Played entire career with the team (2000–2018)	
Daniel Sedin†	17	1,306	Played entire career with the team (2000–2018)	
Trevor Linden	16	1,140	Played with the team on two separate occasions (1988–1998, 2001–2008)	
Alexander Edler	15	925	(2006–2021)	
Stan Smyl	13	896	(1978–1991)	
Markus Naslund	12	884	(1996–2008)	
Alex Burrows	12	822	(2006–2017)	
Harold Snepsts	12	781	Played with the team on two separate occasions (1974–1984, 1988–1989)	
Mattias Ohlund	11	770	(1997–2009)	
Dennis Kearns	10	677	(1971–1981)	

=== Vegas Golden Knights ===
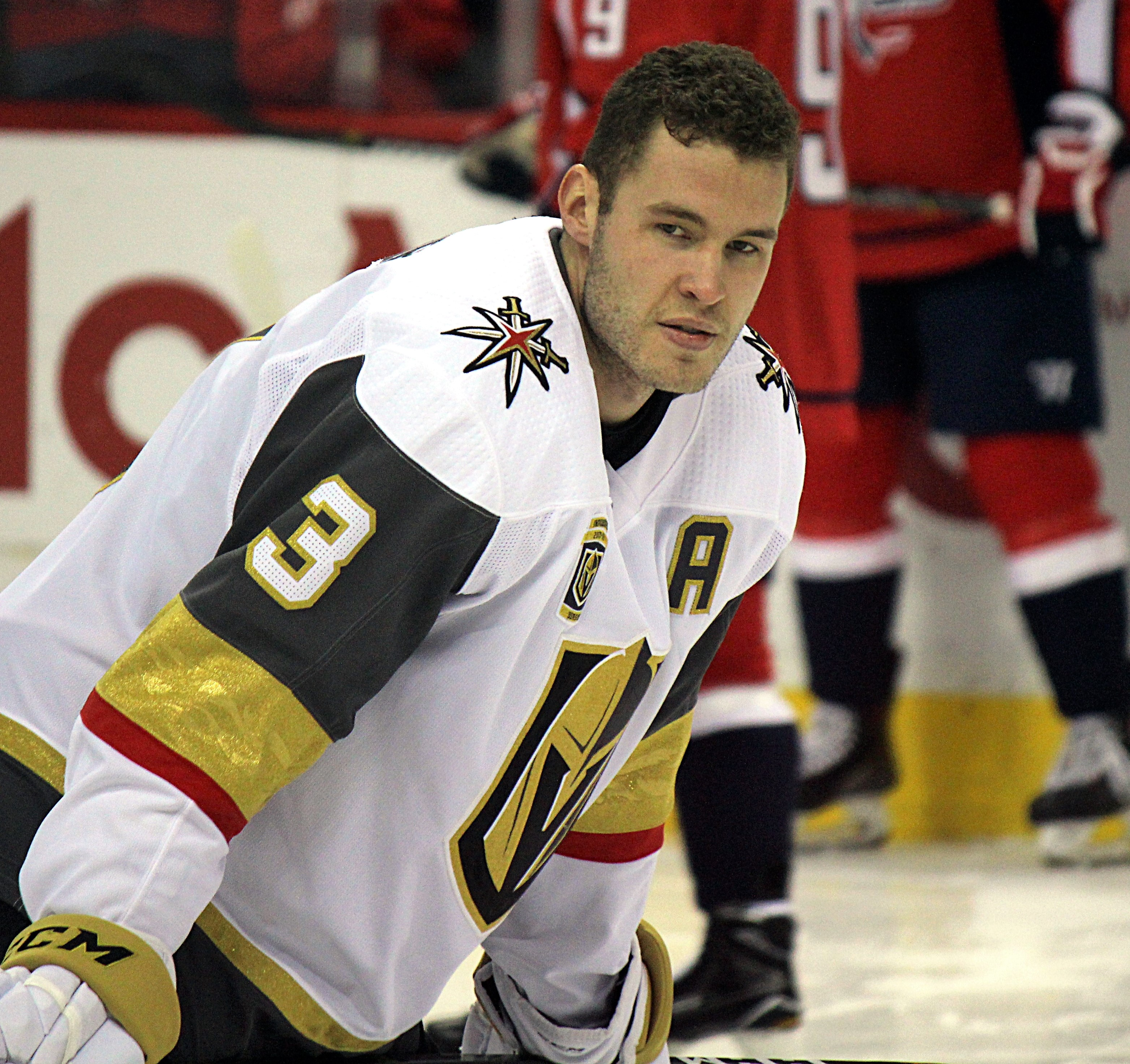
Brayden McNabb currently leads the Golden Knights in games played.

Player	Seasons played with team	Games played	Notes	Ref(s)
Brayden McNabb↑	9	642	(2017–present)	
Shea Theodore↑	9	580	(2017–present)	
William Karlsson↑	9	569	(2017–present)	
Jonathan Marchessault	7	514	(2017–2024)	
Reilly Smith↑	8	487	(2017–2023, 2025–present); Played with the team on two separate occasions.	
Keegan Kolesar↑	7	436	Played entire career with the team (2019–present)	
Mark Stone↑	7	399	(2019–present)	
William Carrier	7	372	(2017–2024)	
Zach Whitecloud	8	368	(2018–2026)	
Nicolas Hague	6	364	(2019–2025)	

=== Washington Capitals ===
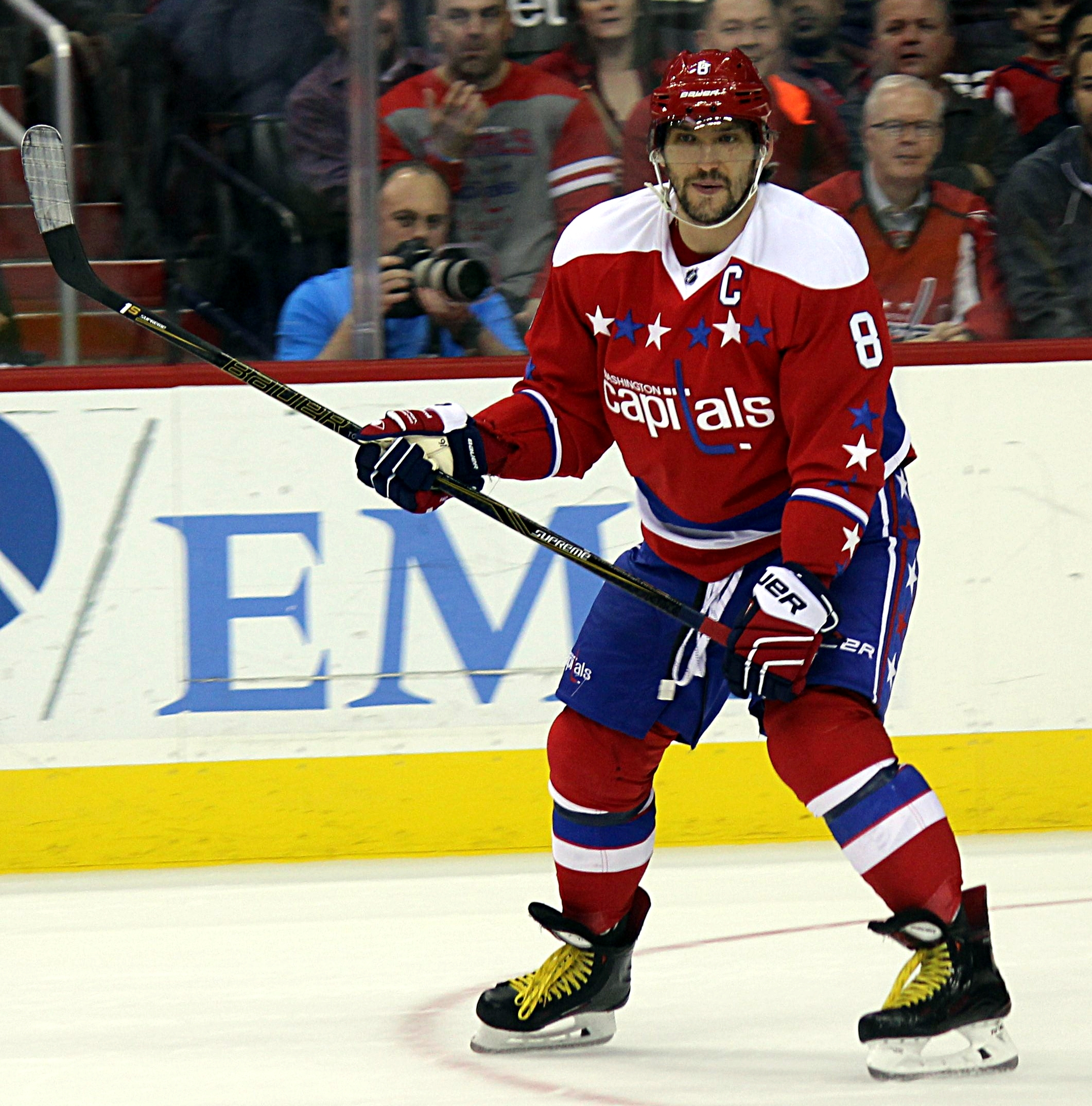
Alexander Ovechkin is the first Washington Capital to play 1,000 games with the team.

Player	Seasons played with team	Games played	Notes	Ref(s)
Alexander Ovechkin↑	20	1,572	Played entire career with the team (2005–present)	
John Carlson↑	17	1,143	(2009–2026)	
Nicklas Backstrom	16	1,105	Played entire career with the team (2007–2023)	
Calle Johansson	15	983	(1989–2003)	
Peter Bondra	14	961	(1990–2004)	
Kelly Miller	13	940	(1987–1999)	
Tom Wilson↑	12	906	Played entire career with the team (2014–present)	
Dale Hunter	12	872	(1987–1999)	
Michal Pivonka	13	825	(1986–1999)	
Mike Gartner†	10	578	(1979–1989)	

=== Winnipeg Jets ===
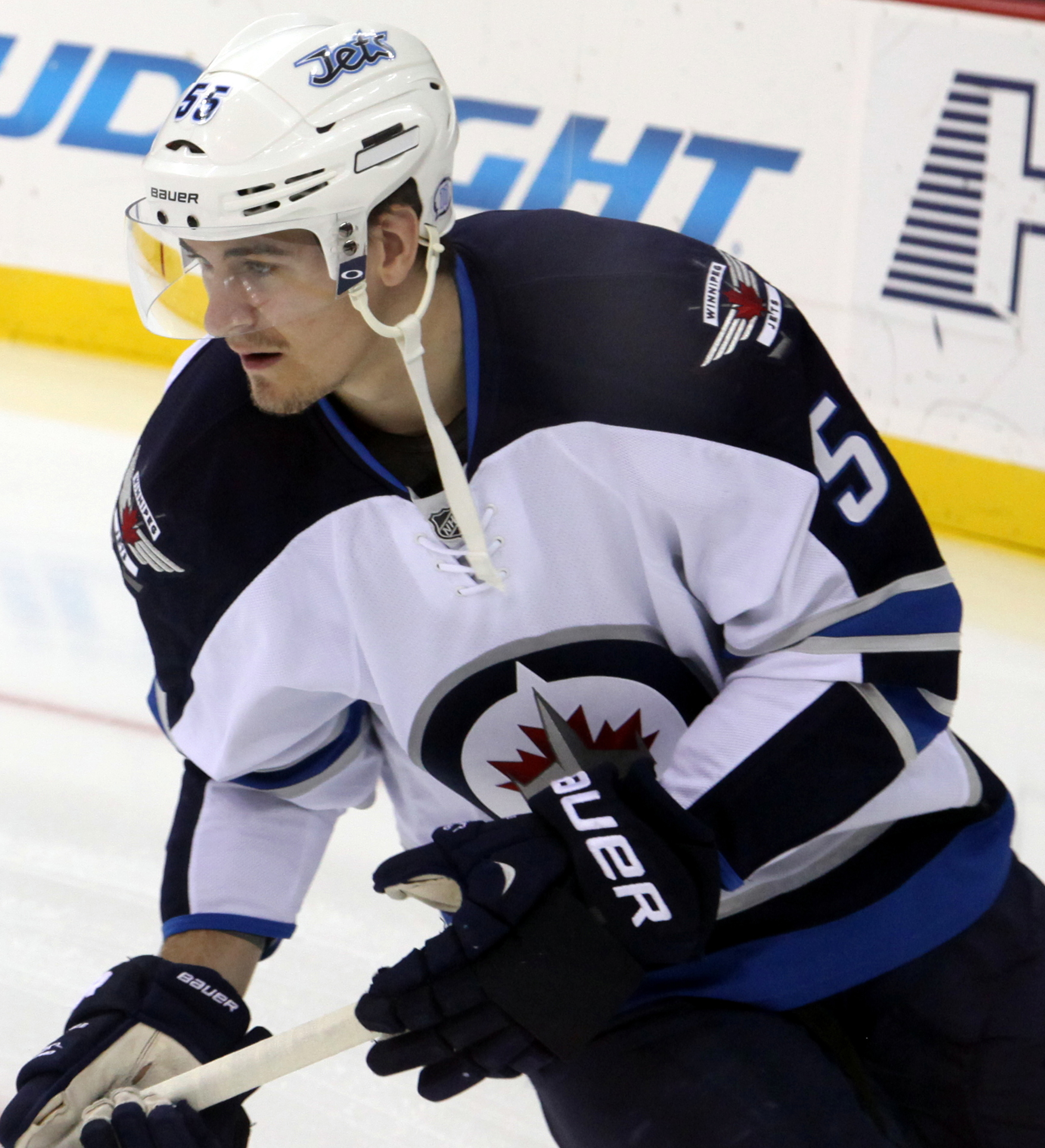
Mark Scheifele is the leader for games played with the Thrashers/Jets.

Player	Seasons played with team	Games played	Notes	Ref(s)
Mark Scheifele↑	15	960	Played entire career with the team (2011–present)	
Blake Wheeler	13	897	Atlanta (2011); Winnipeg (2011–2023)	
Adam Lowry↑	12	844	Played entire career with the team (2014–present)	
Bryan Little	13	843	Atlanta (2007–2011); Winnipeg (2011–2019); Played entire career with the team	
Josh Morrissey↑	11	738	Played entire career with the team (2016–present)	
Tobias Enstrom	11	719	Atlanta (2007–2011); Winnipeg (2011–2018); Played entire career with the team	
Chris Thorburn	10	709	Atlanta (2007–2011); Winnipeg (2011–2017)	
Kyle Connor↑	10	694	Played entire career with the team (2017–present)	
Nikolai Ehlers	10	674	(2015–2025)	
Connor Hellebuyck	11	623	Played entire career with the team (2015–present)	

The franchise was originally known as the Atlanta Thrashers from 1999 to 2011.

== See also ==
- List of NHL players with 1,000 games played
- List of NHL players who spent their entire career with one franchise
