= Nordingrå =

- Location within Västernorrland Location within Sweden
- Coordinates: 62°55′45″N 18°17′14″E
- Country: Sweden
- Province: Ångermanland
- County: Västernorrland County
- Municipality: Kramfors Municipality

Area
  - Total: 0.65 km^{2} (0.25 sq mi)

Population (31 December 2010)
  - Total: 306
  - Density: 472/km^{2} (1,220/sq mi)
- Time zone: UTC+1 (CET)
  - Summer (DST): UTC+2 (CEST)
- Climate: Dfb

Nordingrå (Swedish pronunciation: [ˈnûːɖɪŋˌroː]) is a locality situated in Kramfors Municipality, Västernorrland County, Sweden, with 306 inhabitants in 2010.

It is also a parish of some 50 villages, with a population of about 1500. Nordingrå is a part of the Höga Kusten (High Coast) World Heritage Site.

== Notable residents ==
- Tobias Enström, National Hockey League defenceman
- Arne Ahman, Athlete & Olympian
