= Tommy Enström =

Swedish ice hockey player

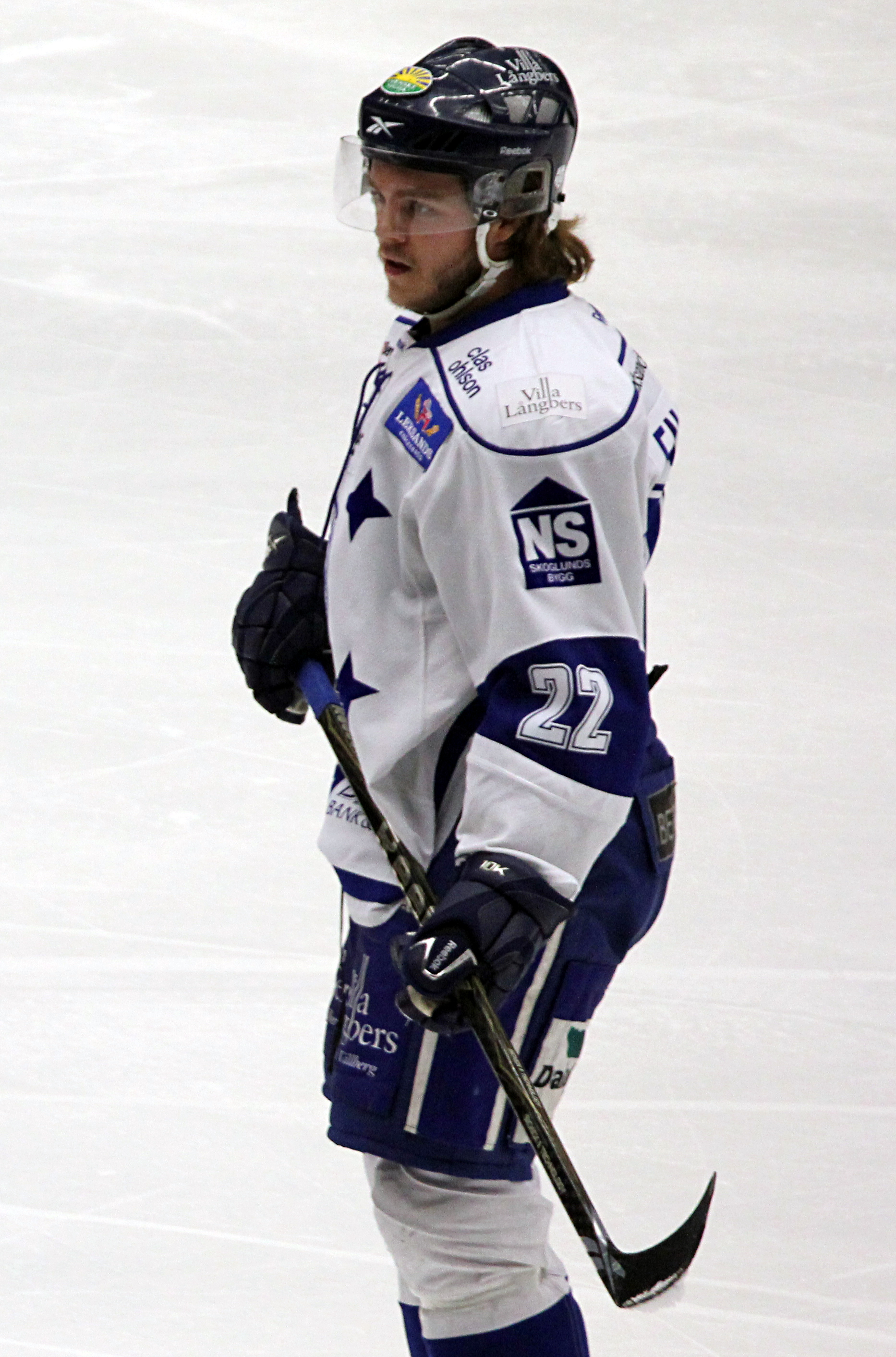
- Born: 30 July 1986 (age 40) Kramfors, Sweden
- Height: 5 ft 10 in (178 cm)
- Weight: 185 lb (84 kg; 13 st 3 lb)
- Position: Defence/Centre
- Shoots: Left
- Allsv team Former teams: Modo Hockey; Rögle BK; Frisk Asker
- Playing career: 2005–present

Tommy Enström (born 30 July 1986) is a Swedish professional ice hockey player, currently playing with Modo Hockey in the HockeyAllsvenskan (Allsv). Enström returned to his original club, Modo, after 10 seasons and upon the club's relegation to the HockeyAllsvenskan on 24 May 2016. He is a younger brother to veteran NHL defenseman, Tobias Enström.

== Career statistics ==
			Regular season					Playoffs
Season	Team	League	GP	G	A	Pts	PIM	GP	G	A	Pts	PIM
2000–01	Höga Kusten HF	Division 2	—	—	—	—	—	—	—	—	—	—
2001–02	Modo Hockey U16	U16 SM	5	3	3	6	14	—	—	—	—	—
2001–02	Modo Hockey J18	J18 Allsvenskan	5	3	3	6	0	1	0	0	0	0
2002–03	Modo Hockey J18	J18 Allsvenskan	8	2	8	10	39	6	5	2	7	2
2002–03	Modo Hockey J20	J20 Superelit	12	1	1	2	33	—	—	—	—	—
2003–04	Modo Hockey J18	J18 Allsvenskan	—	—	—	—	—	3	0	5	5	16
2003–04	Modo Hockey J20	J20 Superelit	34	9	11	20	38	8	5	2	7	20
2004–05	Modo Hockey J20	J20 Superelit	28	14	19	33	51	5	1	1	2	10
2005–06	Modo Hockey J20	J20 Superelit	10	5	7	12	31	—	—	—	—	—
2005–06	Modo Hockey	Elitserien	29	0	0	0	12	—	—	—	—	—
2005–06	IF Sundsvall Hockey	HockeyAllsvenskan	11	0	4	4	0	—	—	—	—	—
2006–07	IF Sundsvall Hockey	HockeyAllsvenskan	32	8	14	22	79	—	—	—	—	—
2007–08	Rögle BK	HockeyAllsvenskan	45	12	14	26	60	10	1	3	4	42
2008–09	Rögle BK	Elitserien	48	2	3	5	16	—	—	—	—	—
2009–10	Rögle BK	Elitserien	54	3	14	17	70	—	—	—	—	—
2010–11	Leksands IF	HockeyAllsvenskan	50	7	19	26	28	6	0	2	2	18
2011–12	Leksands IF	HockeyAllsvenskan	23	1	5	6	14	—	—	—	—	—
2012–13	Tingsryds AIF	HockeyAllsvenskan	48	5	17	22	26	9	1	3	4	4
2013–14	Frisk Asker Ishockey	Norway	24	3	11	14	24	—	—	—	—	—
2013–14	IF Sundsvall Hockey	Hockeyettan	9	4	2	6	4	2	0	2	2	4
2014–15	IF Sundsvall Hockey	Hockeyettan	33	3	21	24	12	9	3	0	3	4
2015–16	IF Sundsvall Hockey	HockeyAllsvenskan	50	6	11	17	38	10	3	5	8	10
2016–17	Modo Hockey	HockeyAllsvenskan	15	1	1	2	6	—	—	—	—	—
2017–18	Modo Hockey	HockeyAllsvenskan	27	1	4	5	8	—	—	—	—	—
2018–19	Modo Hockey	HockeyAllsvenskan	49	3	17	20	36	5	0	2	2	0
2019–20	Modo Hockey	HockeyAllsvenskan	36	3	3	6	6	—	—	—	—	—
2020–21	Modo Hockey	HockeyAllsvenskan	32	1	2	3	12	—	—	—	—	—
Elitserien totals			131	5	17	22	98	—	—	—	—	—
HockeyAllsvenskan totals			418	48	111	159	313	40	5	15	20	74
