= Thomas Enström =

Swedish ice hockey player

- Born: March 3, 1989 (age 36); Örnsköldsvik, Sweden
- Height: 5 ft 6 in (168 cm)
- Weight: 167 lb (76 kg; 11 st 13 lb)
- Position: Forward
- Shot: Right
- Played for: Modo Hockey; Örebro HK
- Playing career: 2007–2014

Erik Thomas Enström (born March 3, 1989, in Örnsköldsvik) is a Swedish former professional ice hockey player. He is the younger brother of Tobias Enström and played in the Swedish Hockey League for Modo Hockey and Örebro HK.
