= Tobias Enström =

Swedish ice hockey player (born 1984)

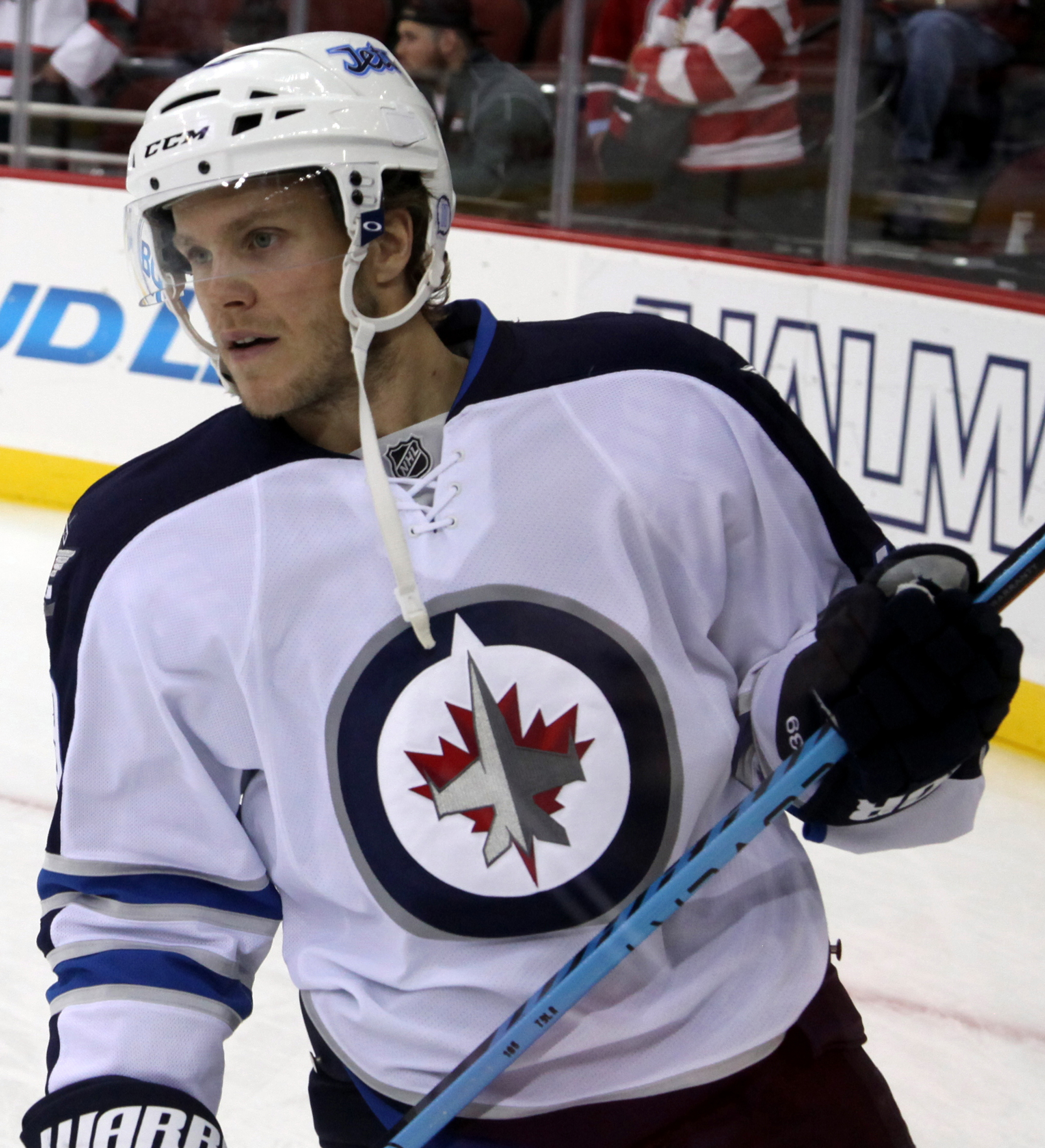
- Enström with the Winnipeg Jets in 2014
- Born: 5 November 1984 (age 41) Nordingrå, Sweden
- Height: 5 ft 10 in (178 cm)
- Weight: 180 lb (82 kg; 12 st 12 lb)
- Position: Defence
- Shot: Left
- Played for: Modo Hockey; Atlanta Thrashers; Winnipeg Jets; EC Red Bull Salzburg
- National team: Sweden
- NHL draft: 239th overall, 2003; Atlanta Thrashers
- Playing career: 2002–2020

Ulf Tobias Enström (born 5 November 1984) is a Swedish former professional ice hockey defenceman who played 11 seasons in the National Hockey League (NHL). He spent his entire NHL career with the Atlanta Thrashers/Winnipeg Jets organization. Outside North America, Enström also had stints with the Swedish club Modo Hockey and the Austrian EC Red Bull Salzburg.

== Playing career ==
=== Early career ===
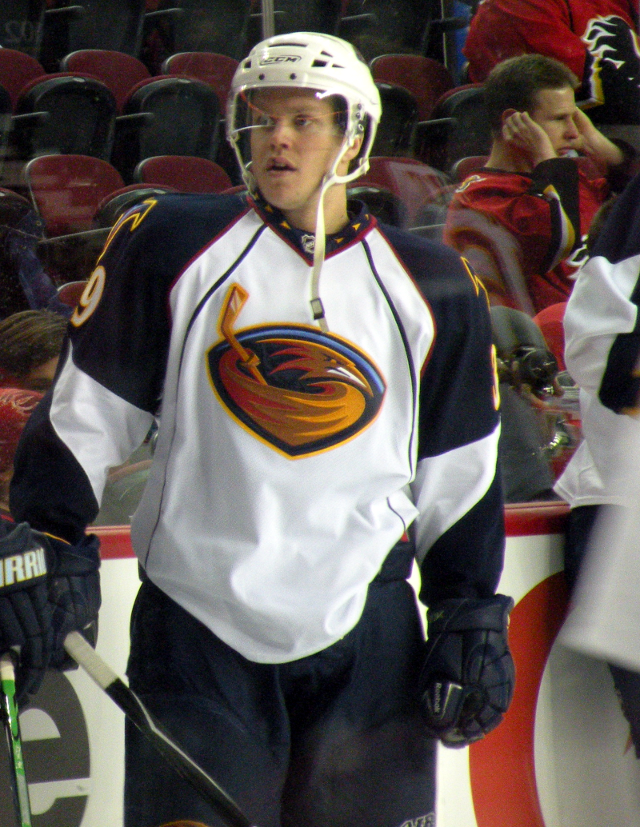
Enström as a member of the Thrashers

Growing up in Nordingrå, Enström played hockey in Höga Kusten Hockey but moved to Örnsköldsvik and Modo Hockey when was accepted to the Hockey high school playing for Modo J18. After two second places with Modo's J18, he advanced to Modo's J20 and later to the Elitserien team.

Following a successful rookie season during his first year in Elitserien, where he was elected Rookie of the Year, he was drafted in the 2003 NHL entry draft by the Atlanta Thrashers in the eighth round, 239th overall. He won the 2006–07 Swedish Elite League championships with Modo Hockey and finished first in assists in the playoffs.

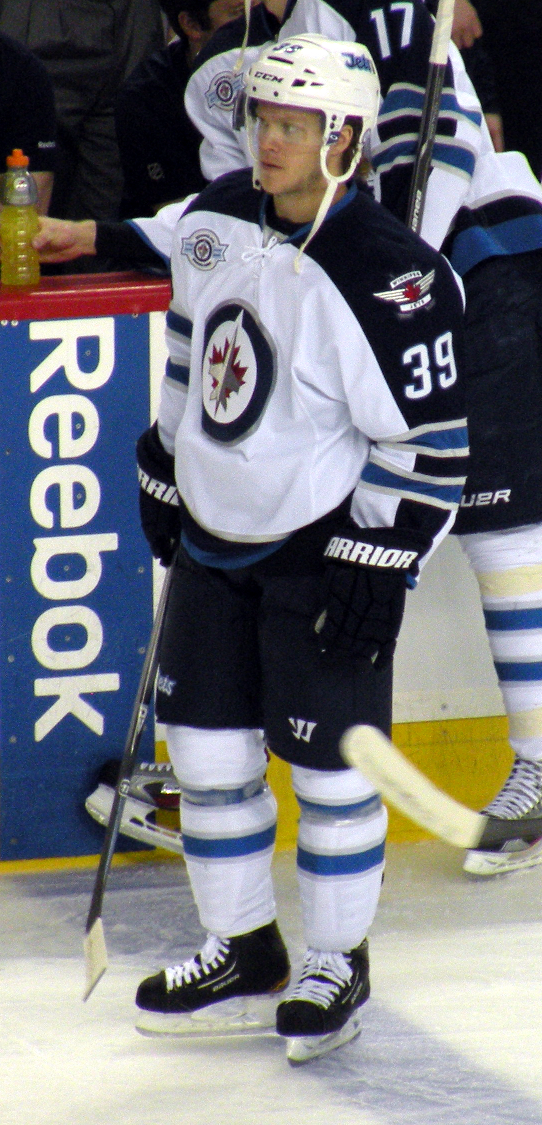
Enström with the Winnipeg Jets.

=== Atlanta/Winnipeg ===
Enström signed a two-year contract with Atlanta in late May 2007 and made the team out of training camp, playing all 82 in his first three seasons to start his career. He scored his first NHL goal on 23 October 2007, against Vesa Toskala of the Toronto Maple Leafs. Enström finished the season with five goals and 33 assists. The following season, he recorded five goals along with 27 assists, as well as attaining a career-high +14 plus-minus rating. During the 2010–11 season, he broke a finger blocking a shot against the New York Rangers on 22 January 2011, that ruled him out for six games and ended his games played streak at 296 consecutive games.

In 2011, Enström was selected to his first All-Star Game, along with teammate Dustin Byfuglien. This was the first time the Thrashers had a defenseman in the All-Star Game since Petr Buzek in 2000. His injury sustained against the Rangers, however, prevented him from playing in the game.

=== Return to Sweden ===
On 25 August 2018, Enström signed a one-year deal with Modo Hockey of HockeyAllsvenskan.

== Personal life ==
He comes from a hockey family where both of his brothers, Tommy Enström and Thomas Enström, as well as his sister, Tina Enström, all are or have represented various teams within the Modo Hockey organization.

In June 2013, Enström was assaulted and robbed in his hometown of Örnsköldsvik, but recovered quickly from only minor injuries. The perpetrator was later arrested and is being tried for robbery and battery.

== Career statistics ==
=== Regular season and playoffs ===
			Regular season					Playoffs
Season	Team	League	GP	G	A	Pts	PIM	GP	G	A	Pts	PIM
1999–2000	Modo Hockey	J18 Allsv	3	0	0	0	0	—	—	—	—	—
2000–01	Modo Hockey	J18 Allsv	19	7	7	14	20	7	1	1	2	2
2000–01	Modo Hockey	J20	1	0	0	0	0	—	—	—	—	—
2001–02	Modo Hockey	J20	21	1	7	8	10	—	—	—	—	—
2001–02	Modo Hockey	J18 Allsv	—	—	—	—	—	1	0	0	0	0
2002–03	Modo Hockey	J20	7	4	6	10	31	—	—	—	—	—
2002–03	Modo Hockey	SEL	42	1	5	6	16	6	0	1	1	4
2003–04	Modo Hockey	SEL	33	1	4	5	6	6	1	1	2	2
2003–04	Modo Hockey	J20	—	—	—	—	—	8	0	3	3	4
2004–05	Modo Hockey	SEL	49	4	10	14	24	2	0	0	0	0
2005–06	Modo Hockey	SEL	47	4	7	11	48	4	0	1	1	25
2006–07	Modo Hockey	SEL	55	7	21	28	52	20	1	11	12	37
2007–08	Atlanta Thrashers	NHL	82	5	33	38	42	—	—	—	—	—
2008–09	Atlanta Thrashers	NHL	82	5	27	32	52	—	—	—	—	—
2009–10	Atlanta Thrashers	NHL	82	6	44	50	30	—	—	—	—	—
2010–11	Atlanta Thrashers	NHL	72	10	41	51	54	—	—	—	—	—
2011–12	Winnipeg Jets	NHL	62	6	27	33	38	—	—	—	—	—
2012–13	EC Red Bull Salzburg	EBEL	5	1	0	1	4	—	—	—	—	—
2012–13	Winnipeg Jets	NHL	22	4	11	15	8	—	—	—	—	—
2013–14	Winnipeg Jets	NHL	82	10	20	30	56	—	—	—	—	—
2014–15	Winnipeg Jets	NHL	60	4	19	23	36	4	0	1	1	0
2015–16	Winnipeg Jets	NHL	72	2	14	16	44	—	—	—	—	—
2016–17	Winnipeg Jets	NHL	60	1	13	14	42	—	—	—	—	—
2017–18	Winnipeg Jets	NHL	43	1	5	6	20	11	0	0	0	2
2018–19	Modo Hockey	Allsv	51	2	23	25	46	5	0	3	3	4
2019–20	Modo Hockey	Allsv	43	0	12	12	28	2	0	0	0	2
SHL totals			226	17	47	64	146	38	2	14	16	68
NHL totals			719	54	254	308	422	15	0	1	1	2

=== International ===
Year	Team	Event	Result	GP	G	A	Pts	PIM
2002	Sweden	WJC18	9th	8	2	1	3	6
2003	Sweden	WJC	8th	6	1	1	2	4
2004	Sweden	WJC	7th	6	0	3	3	0
2007	Sweden	WC	4th	9	0	2	2	10
2009	Sweden	WC	4th	2	0	0	0	0
2010	Sweden	OG	5th	4	0	2	2	4
Junior totals				20	3	5	8	10
Senior totals				15	0	4	4	14

== Awards and achievements ==
Award	Year(s)
J20 SuperElit Champion	2004
SHL Rookie of the Year	2003
Elitserien champion	2007
NHL Rookie of the Month	November 2007
NHL YoungStars Game	2008
NHL All-Rookie Team	2008
NHL All-Star	*2011

- -Selected, Did Not Play due to Injury

== Records ==
- Atlanta Thrashers' franchise record for most points (defenceman): 108 (16 January 2010 vs. Carolina Hurricanes) (surpassed Yannick Tremblay)
- Atlanta Thrashers' franchise record for most assists in a season (defenceman): 44 (16 January 2010 vs. Carolina Hurricanes)
- Atlanta Thrashers' franchise record for most games in a row: 296 (22 January 2011 vs. New York Rangers) (surpassed Vyacheslav Kozlov)
