= List of NHL players with 1,000 games played =

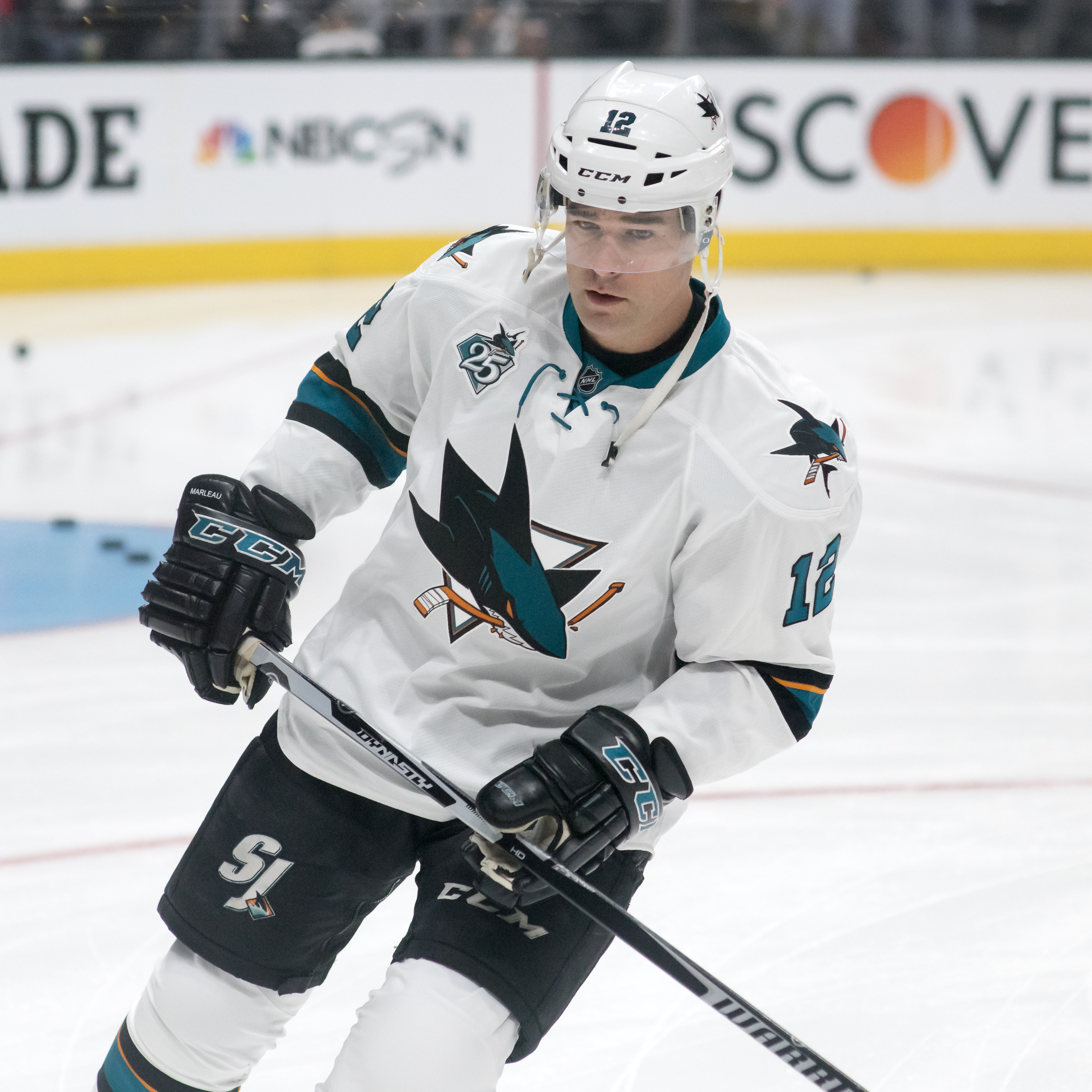
Patrick Marleau appeared in 1,779 games, the most in league history.

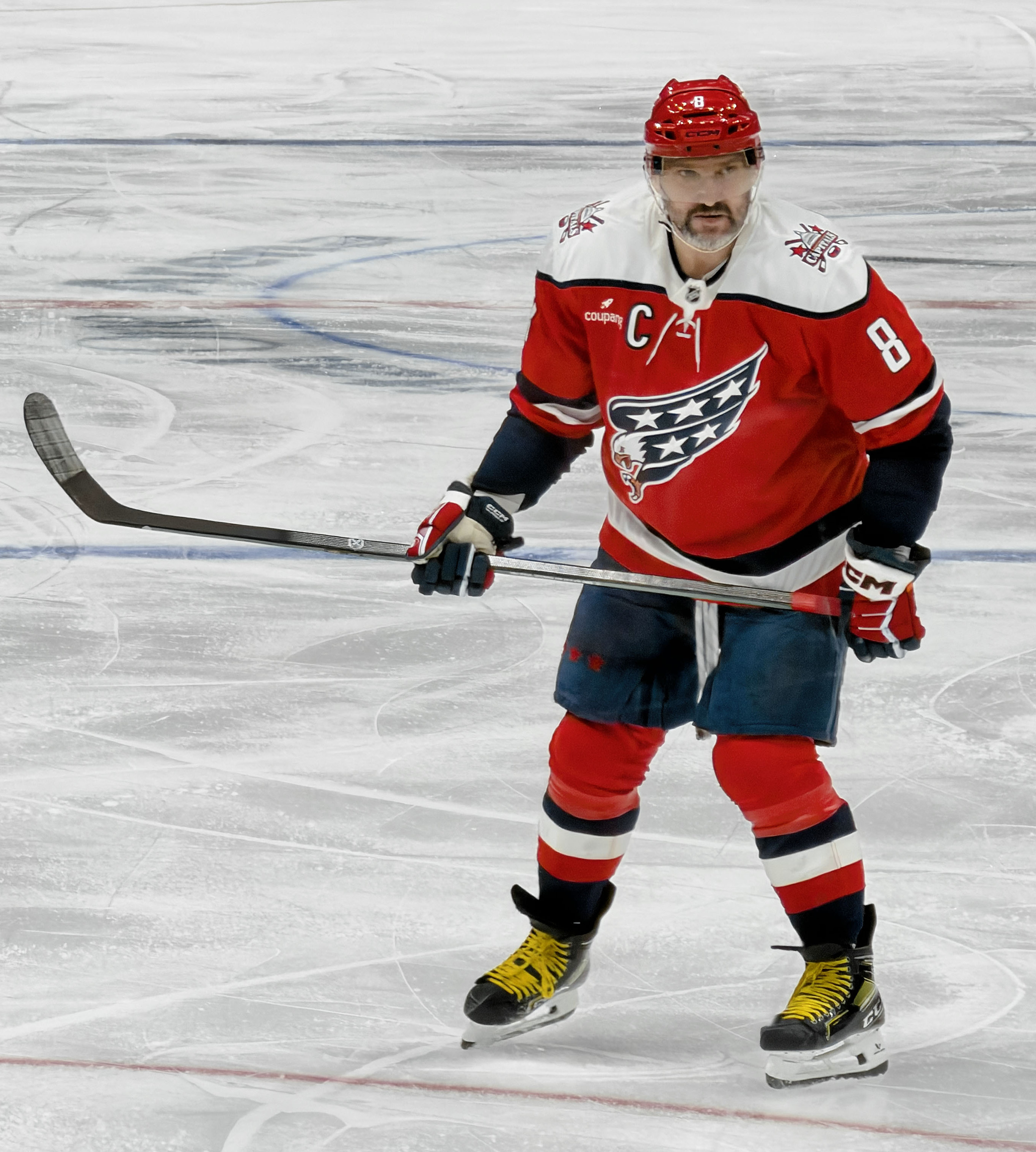
Alexander Ovechkin has appeared in 1,573 games, 15th overall, but the most by anyone who has played their entire career with only one franchise.

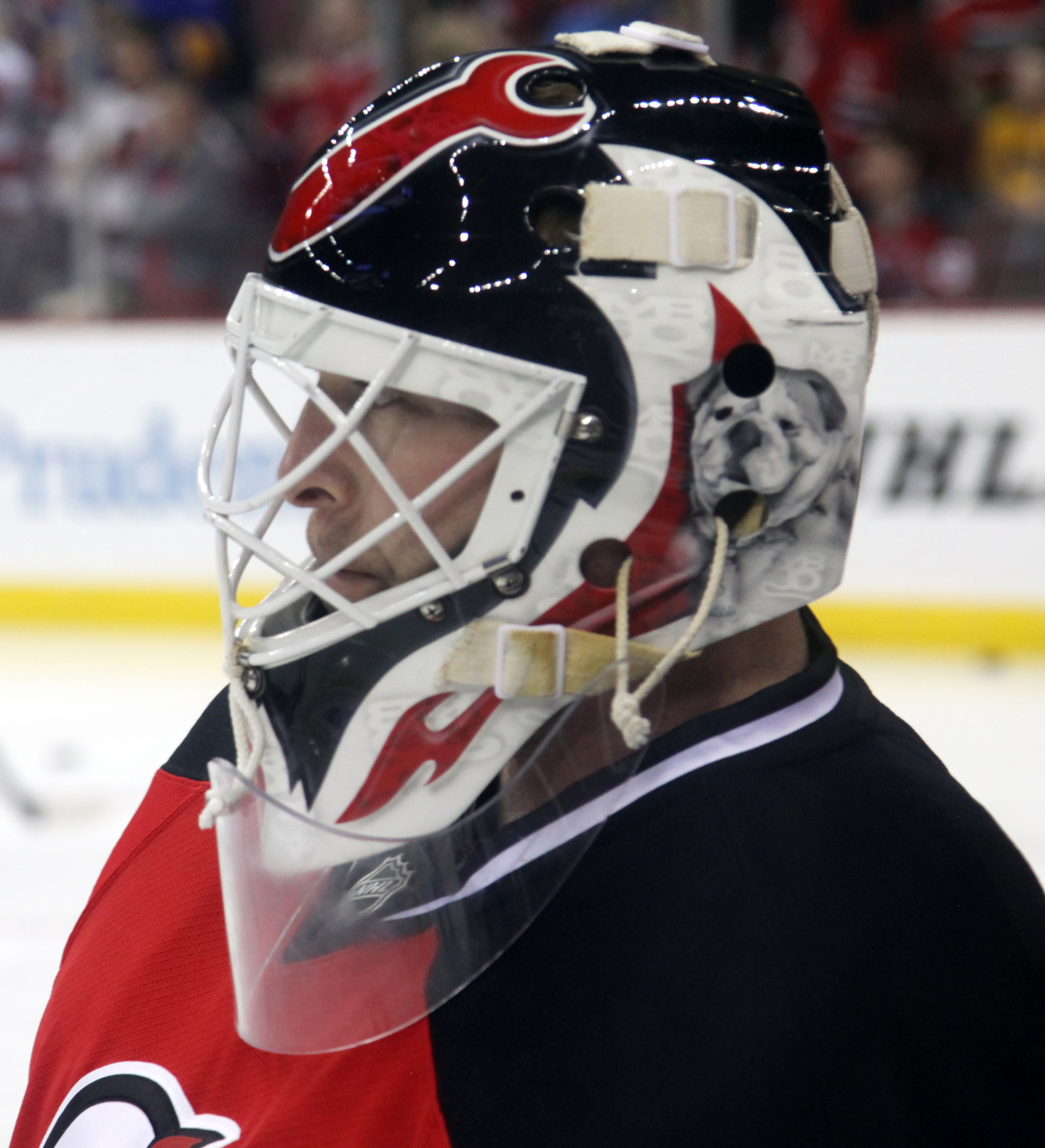
Martin Brodeur appeared in 1,266 games, the most of any goaltender.

The National Hockey League (NHL) is the major professional ice hockey league which operates in Canada and the United States. Since its inception in 1917–18, 428 players have played at least 1,000 regular season games, varying in amounts between Patrick Marleau's 1,779 to Bernie Federko's 1,000. Of these players, a number have been inducted into the Hockey Hall of Fame. A player who reaches the milestone is awarded a silver stick.

Forty-nine of the listed players have played for only one franchise (of which 11 are still active as of the conclusion of the 2025–26 regular season). Five of those players played exclusively for the Detroit Red Wings and four played for the Montreal Canadiens, those teams having the most such players. From 1961 until being surpassed by Marleau on April 19, 2021, the record for most games played was held by Gordie Howe, who played 1,767 games. The record for most teams played for by a player who has competed in over 1,000 games is held by Mike Sillinger, who played for 12 teams in his career; Sillinger played his 1,000th game with his 12th and final NHL team, the New York Islanders. Brothers Eric, Jordan, and Marc Staal are the only trio of brothers to play 1,000 games each in the NHL, with Marc making this achievement possible by playing his 1,000th game in the 2021–22 season. Patrick Roy, Martin Brodeur, Roberto Luongo, and Marc-Andre Fleury are the only goaltenders with at least 1,000 games played. The first 1,000-game goaltender was Roy, marked in the 2002–03 season while Brodeur has a goaltender-leading 1,266 games.

Only 25 players have played in over 1,500 games; of those, 17 have been inducted into the Hall of Fame and five more are not yet eligible for induction. Three of those 25 (Nicklas Lidstrom, Alex Delvecchio, and Steve Yzerman) played their entire careers with Detroit; Alexander Ovechkin (Washington) and Anze Kopitar (Los Angeles) are the only players to play over 1,500 games with a single franchise other than Detroit. In addition, eight of the 25 spent at least some portion of their career with the Red Wings, also more than any other team. Ovechkin's 1,573 games is the most for any player in a career spent with only one franchise. The record for most teams played for by a player who has competed in over 1,500 games is held by Jaromir Jagr, who has played for nine teams in his career. Jagr played his 1,500th game with New Jersey, his seventh NHL team.

Due to the much greater number of teams and the greater number of games played in a season, the list is dominated by post-expansion players. No NHL player surpassed 1,000 games before Gordie Howe on November 26, 1961, against the Chicago Black Hawks. Only 17 players in the top 100 started their careers before the expansion era, and only two players—Red Kelly and Bill Gadsby—played in more than 1,000 games and finished their careers before the expansion era.

== Key ==
This list is updated at the end of the season, except for the list of a player's teams, and if the all-time record is broken.

Key of colors and symbols
Color/symbol	Explanation
†	Inducted into the Hockey Hall of Fame
↑	Player currently active in the NHL
#	Active player not currently in the NHL

Key of terms and definitions
Term	Definition
Rank	Overall rank of the player in the list
Player	The name of the player
Team(s)	The NHL team(s) played for by the player
Seasons	How many NHL seasons the player has appeared in
Games played	Total number of regular season NHL games the player has appeared in
Ref(s)	Reference(s)
Bold	Active player's current team

== 1,500 or more games played ==
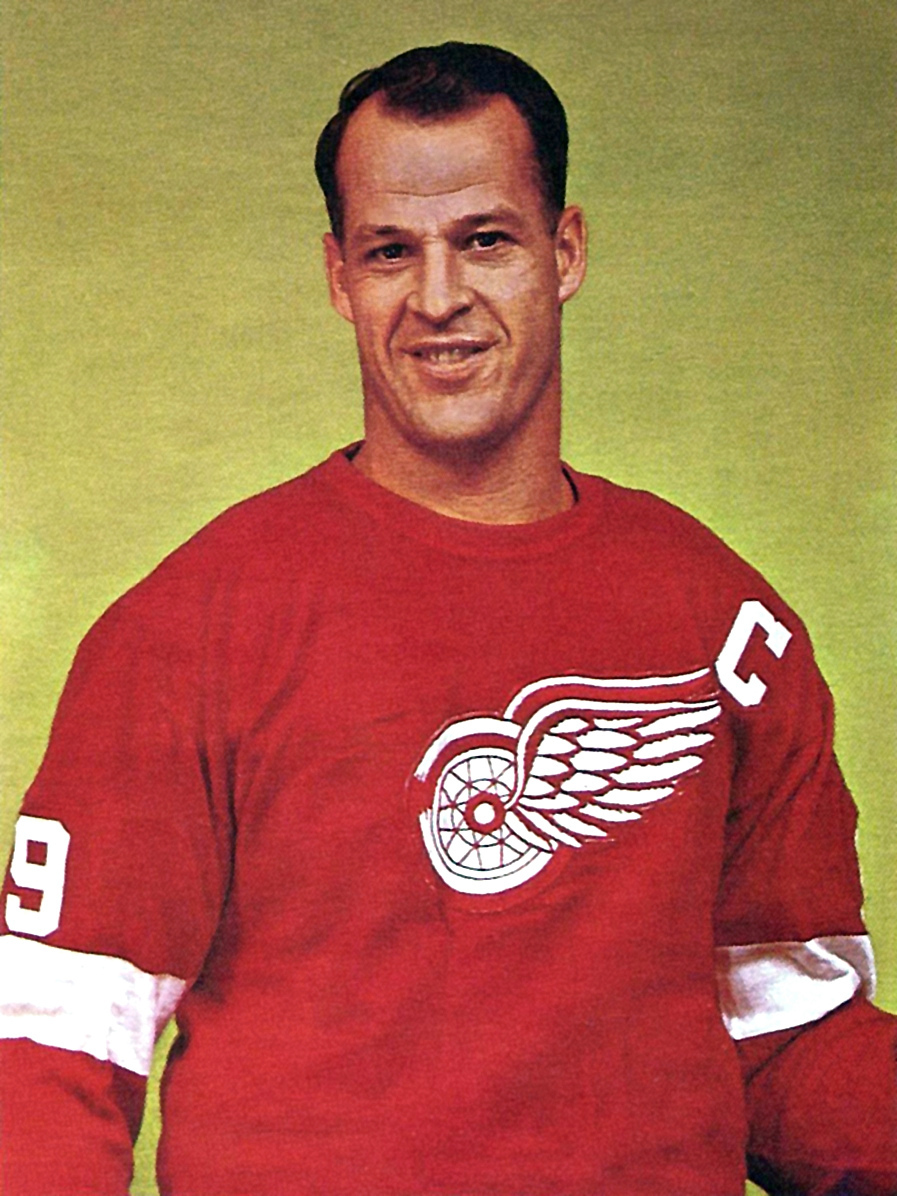
Gordie Howe appeared in 1,767 games, the second-most in league history. He held the record for most games played for 59 years, from 1961 to 2021, and still holds the record for most games played for one franchise.

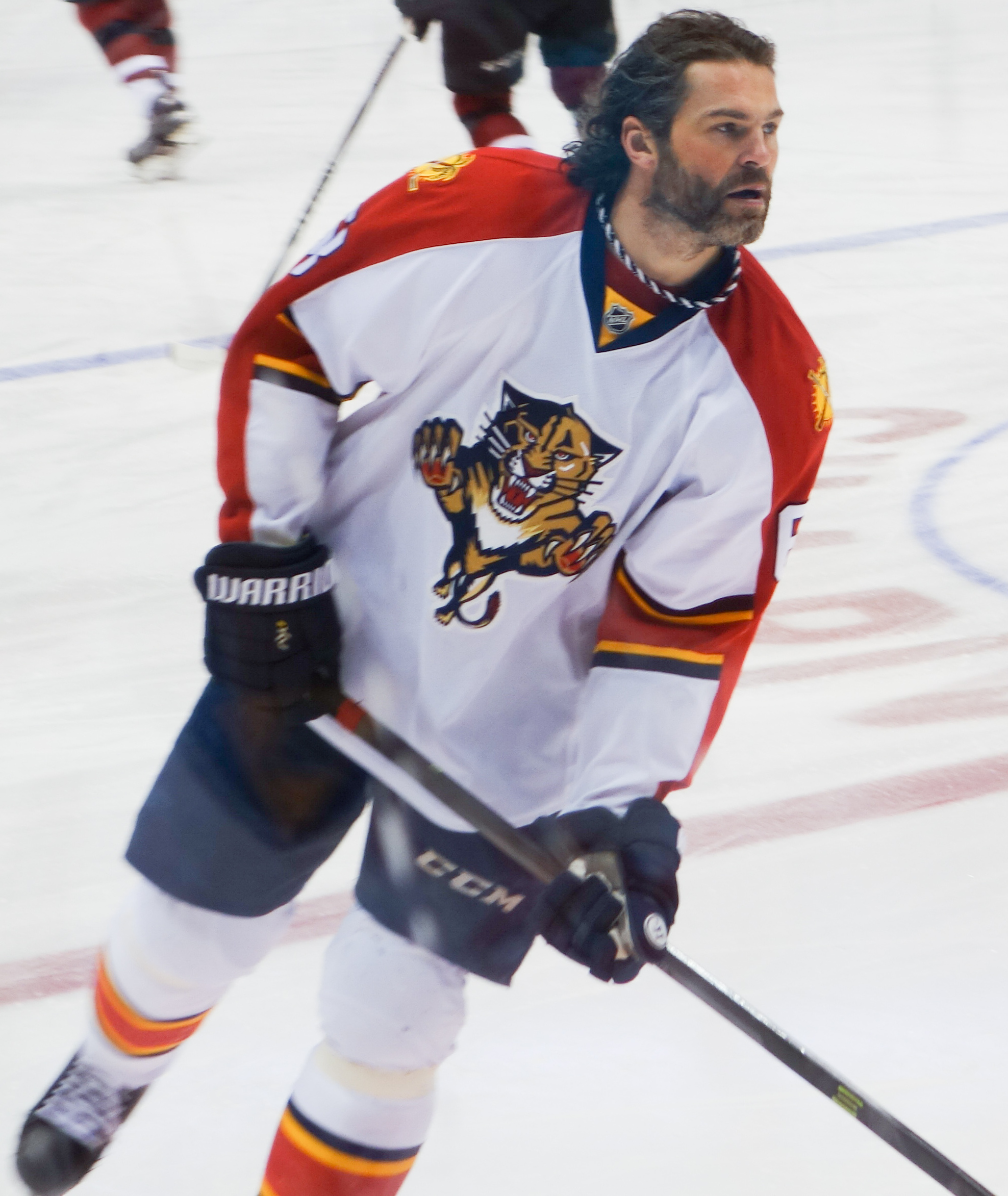
Jaromir Jagr played in 1,733 games, fourth-most in NHL history.

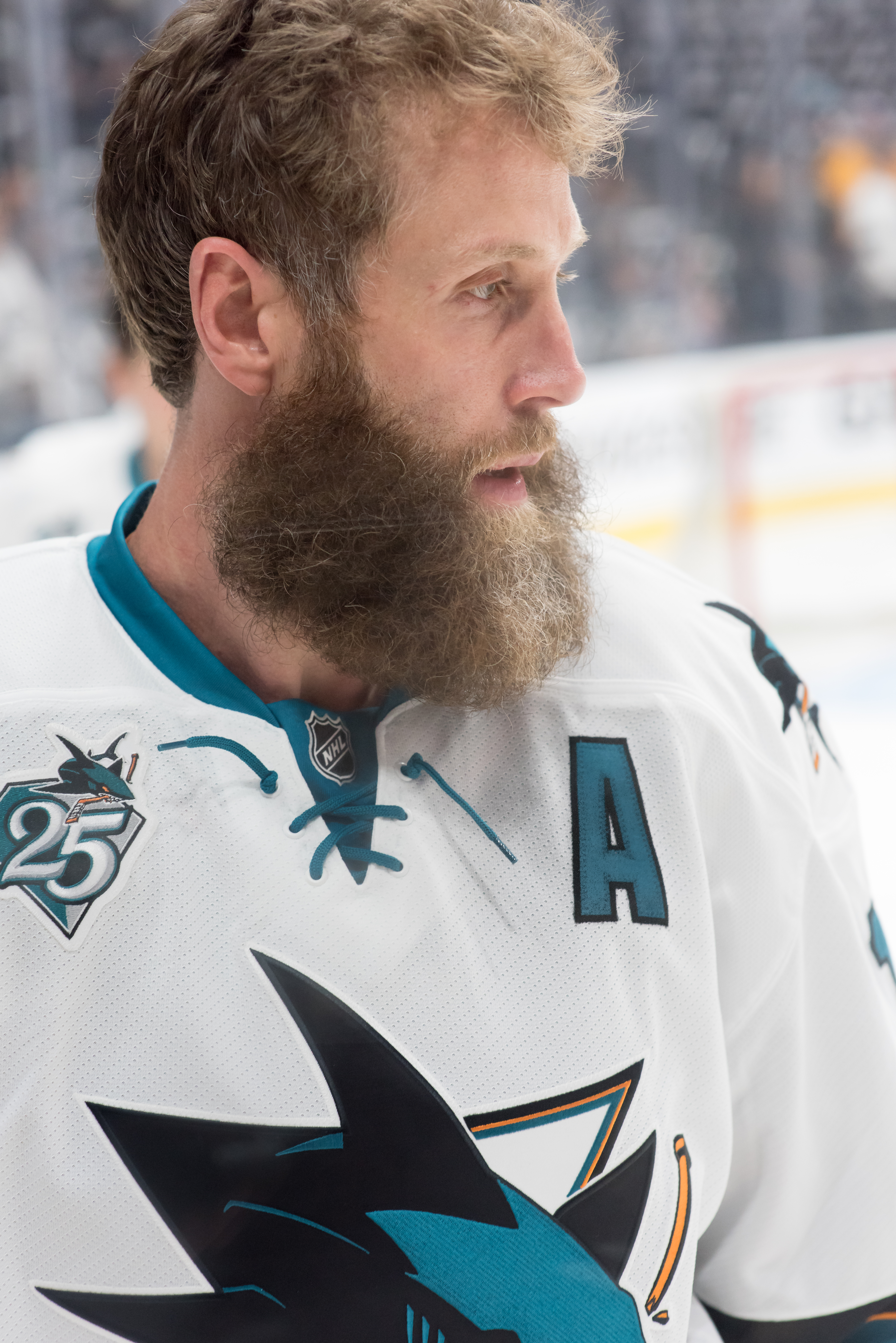
Joe Thornton played in 1,714 games, sixth-most in NHL history.

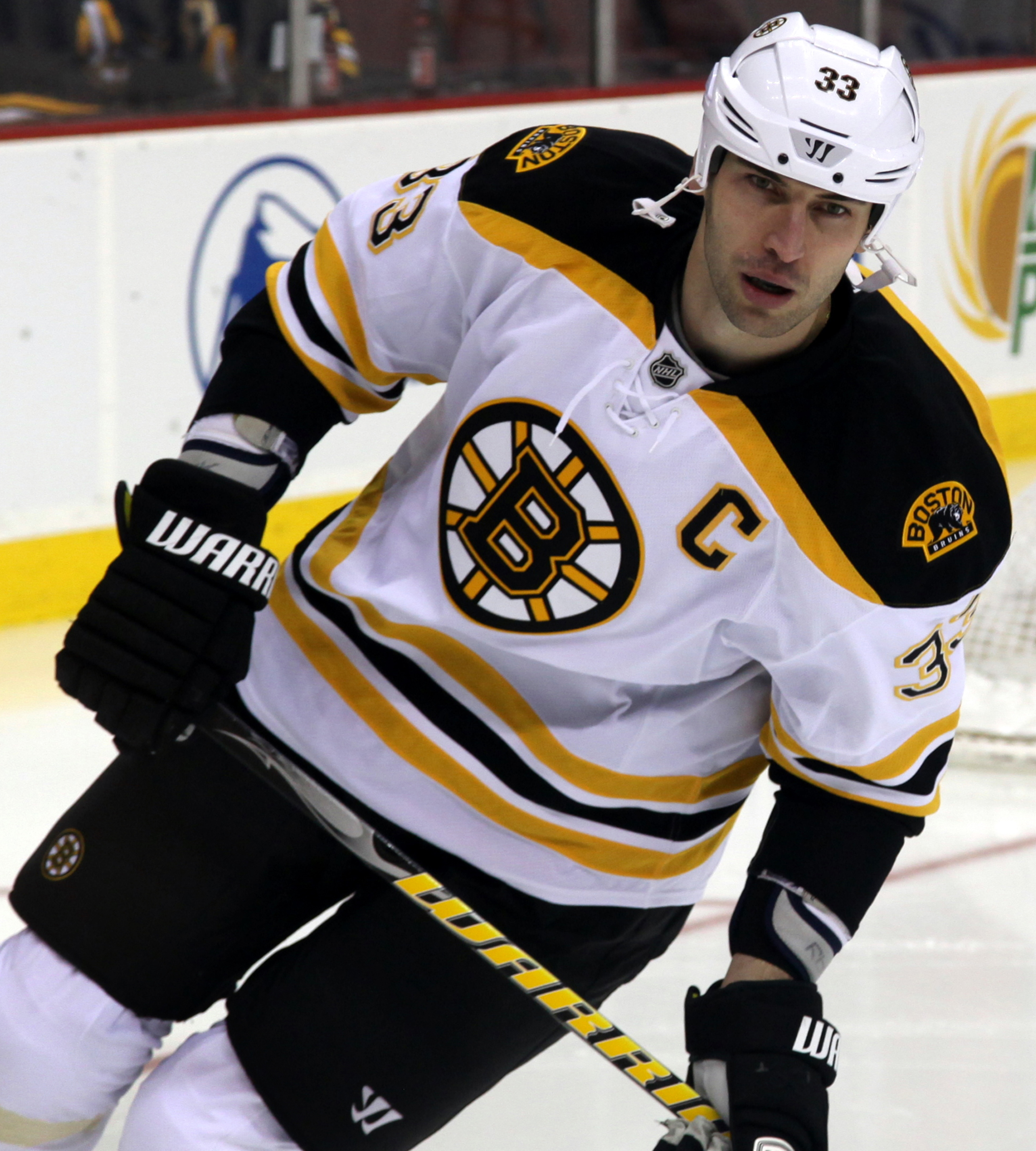
Zdeno Chara played in 1,680 games, the most by a defenseman.

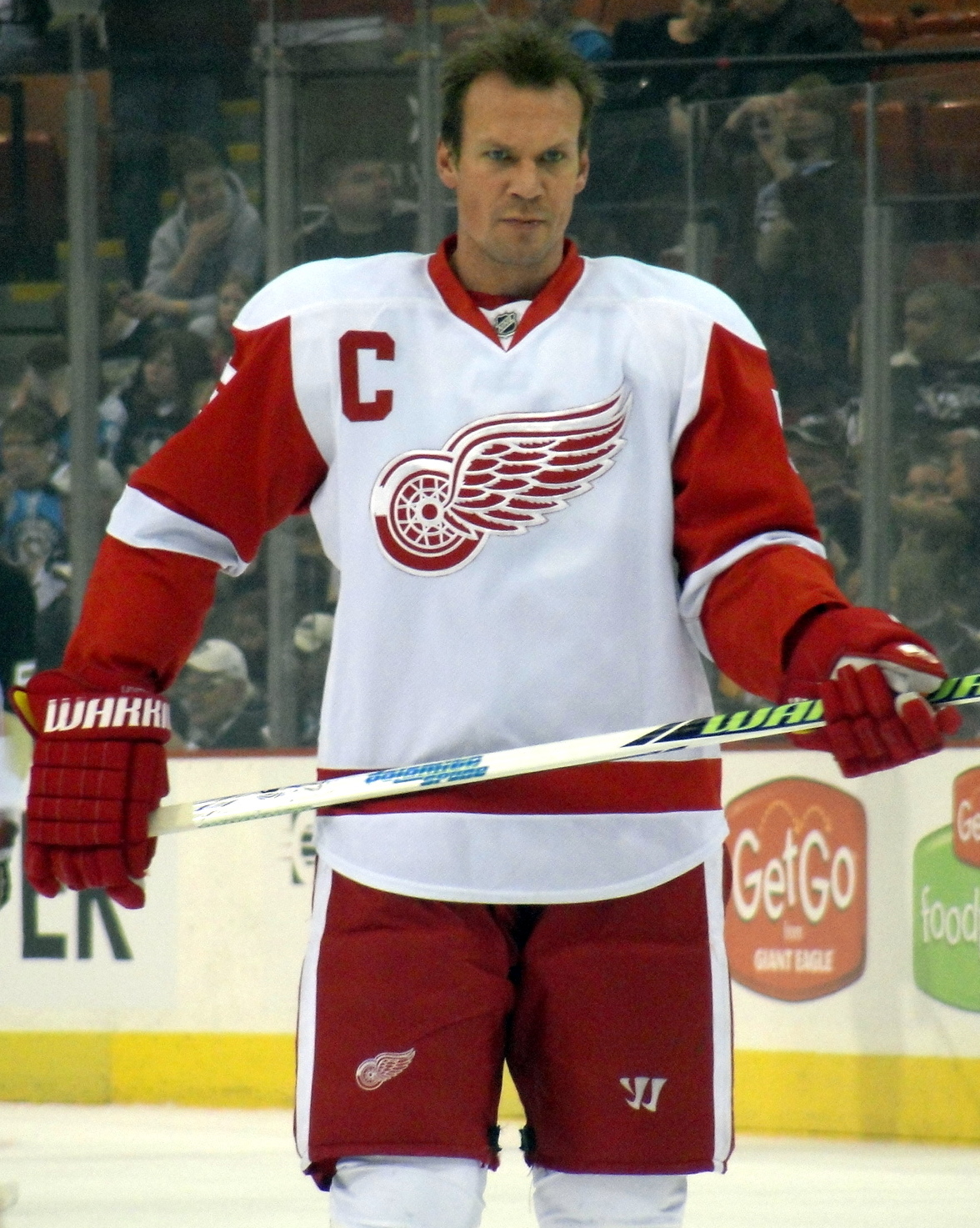
Nicklas Lidstrom appeared in 1,564 games.

Players with 1,500 or more NHL games played
Rank	Player	Team(s)	Seasons	Games played	Ref(s)
1	Patrick Marleau	San Jose, Toronto, Pittsburgh	23	1,779	
2	Gordie Howe†	Detroit, Hartford	26	1,767	
3	Mark Messier†	Edmonton, N.Y. Rangers, Vancouver	25	1,756	
4	Jaromir Jagr#	Pittsburgh, Washington, N.Y. Rangers, Philadelphia, Dallas, Boston, New Jersey, Florida, Calgary	24	1,733	
5	Ron Francis†	Hartford, Pittsburgh, Carolina, Toronto	23	1,731	
6	Joe Thornton†	Boston, San Jose, Toronto, Florida	24	1,714	
7	Zdeno Chara†	N.Y. Islanders, Ottawa, Boston, Washington	24	1,680	
8	Mark Recchi†	Pittsburgh, Philadelphia, Montreal, Carolina, Atlanta Thrashers, Tampa Bay, Boston	22	1,652	
9	Chris Chelios†	Montreal, Chicago, Detroit, Atlanta Thrashers	26	1,651	
10	Dave Andreychuk†	Buffalo, Toronto, New Jersey, Boston, Colorado Avalanche, Tampa Bay	23	1,639	
11	Scott Stevens†	Washington, St. Louis, New Jersey	22	1,635	
12	Larry Murphy†	Los Angeles, Washington, Minnesota North Stars, Pittsburgh, Toronto, Detroit	21	1,615	
13	Ray Bourque†	Boston, Colorado Avalanche	22	1,612	
14	Brent Burns↑	Minnesota Wild, San Jose, Carolina, **Colorado Avalanche**	22	1,579	
15	Alexander Ovechkin↑	**Washington**	21	1,573	
16	Nicklas Lidstrom†	Detroit	20	1,564	
17	Jarome Iginla †	Calgary, Pittsburgh, Boston, Colorado Avalanche, Los Angeles	20	1,554	
18	Alex Delvecchio†	Detroit	24	1,549	
T-19	Johnny Bucyk†	Detroit, Boston	23	1,540	
T-19	Shane Doan	Winnipeg, Phoenix/Arizona	21	1,540	
21	Ryan Suter↑	Nashville, Minnesota Wild, Dallas, St. Louis	20	1,526	
22	Brendan Shanahan†	New Jersey, St. Louis, Hartford, Detroit, N.Y. Rangers	21	1,524	
23	Anze Kopitar	Los Angeles	20	1,521	
24	Matt Cullen	Anaheim, Florida, Carolina, N.Y. Rangers, Ottawa, Minnesota Wild, Nashville, Pittsburgh	21	1,516	
25	Steve Yzerman†	Detroit	22	1,514	

== 1,250–1,499 games played ==
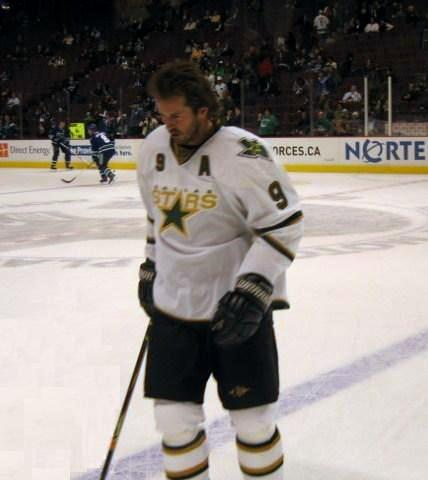
Mike Modano retired after 1,499 games played.

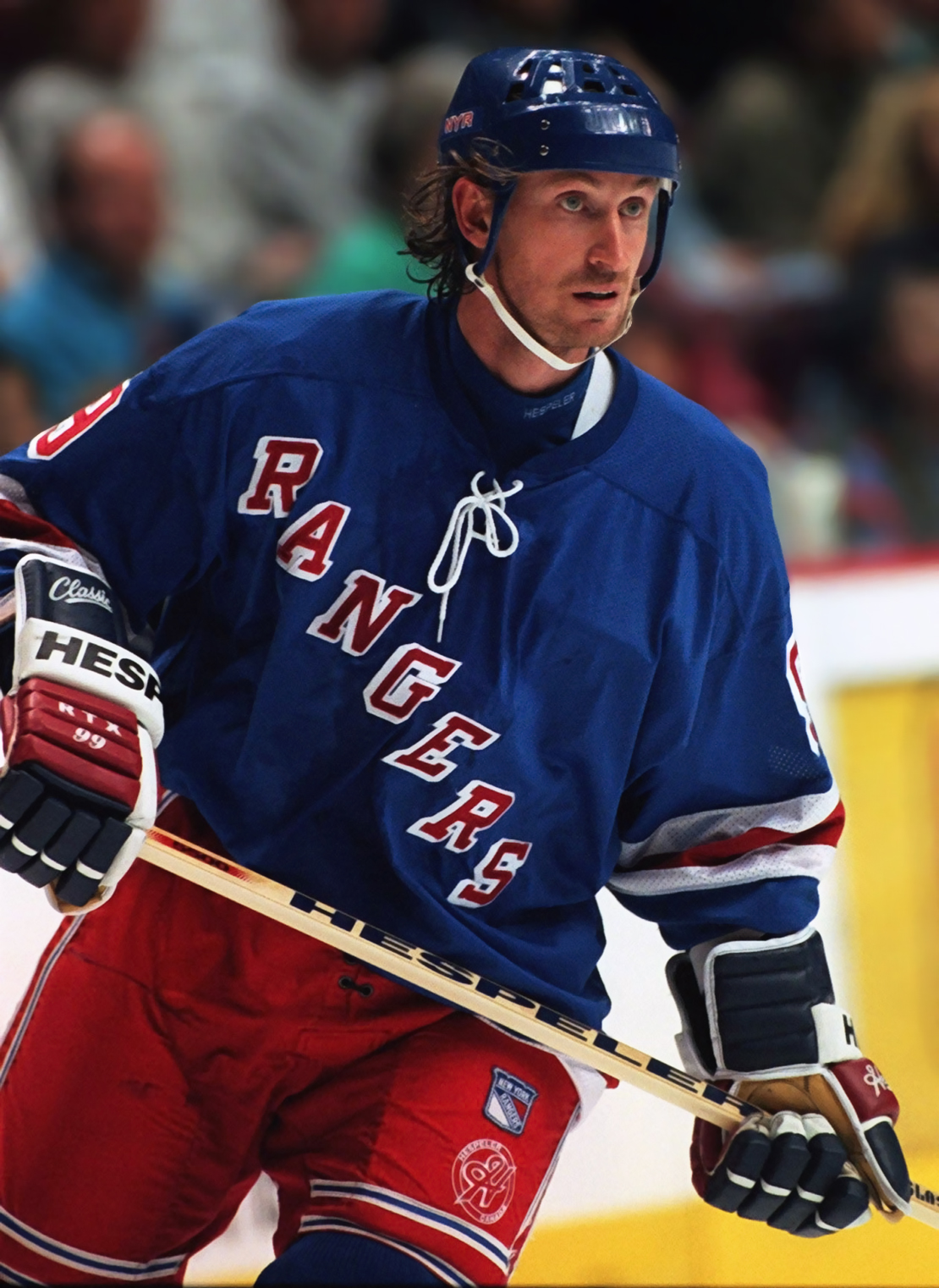
Wayne Gretzky, the NHL's all-time record holder for points, played in 1,487 games, 27th all-time (and fourth when he retired).

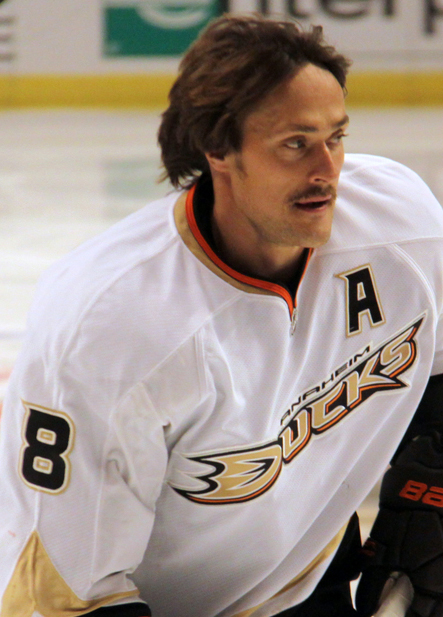
Teemu Selanne played in 1,451 games, 32nd all-time.

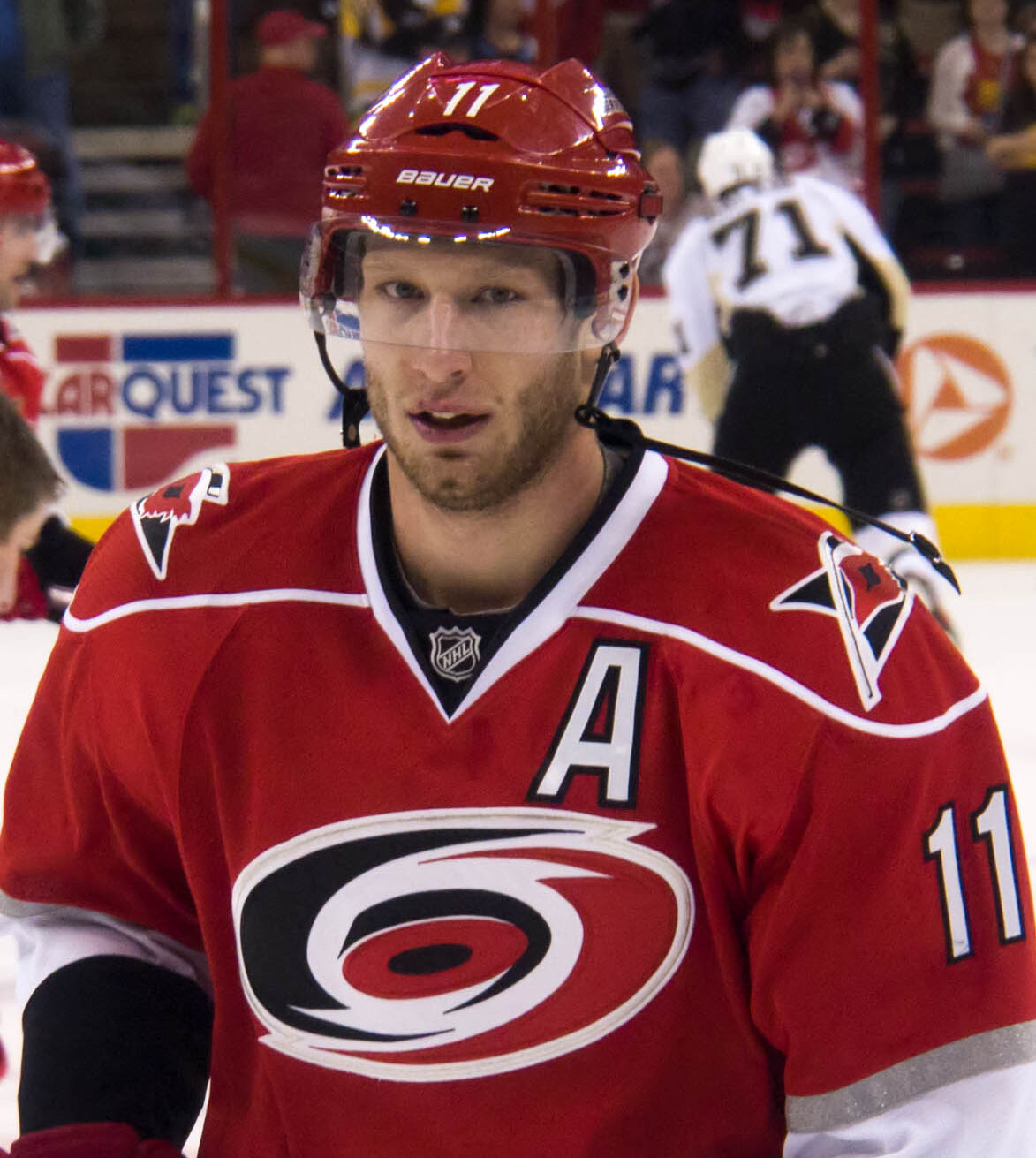
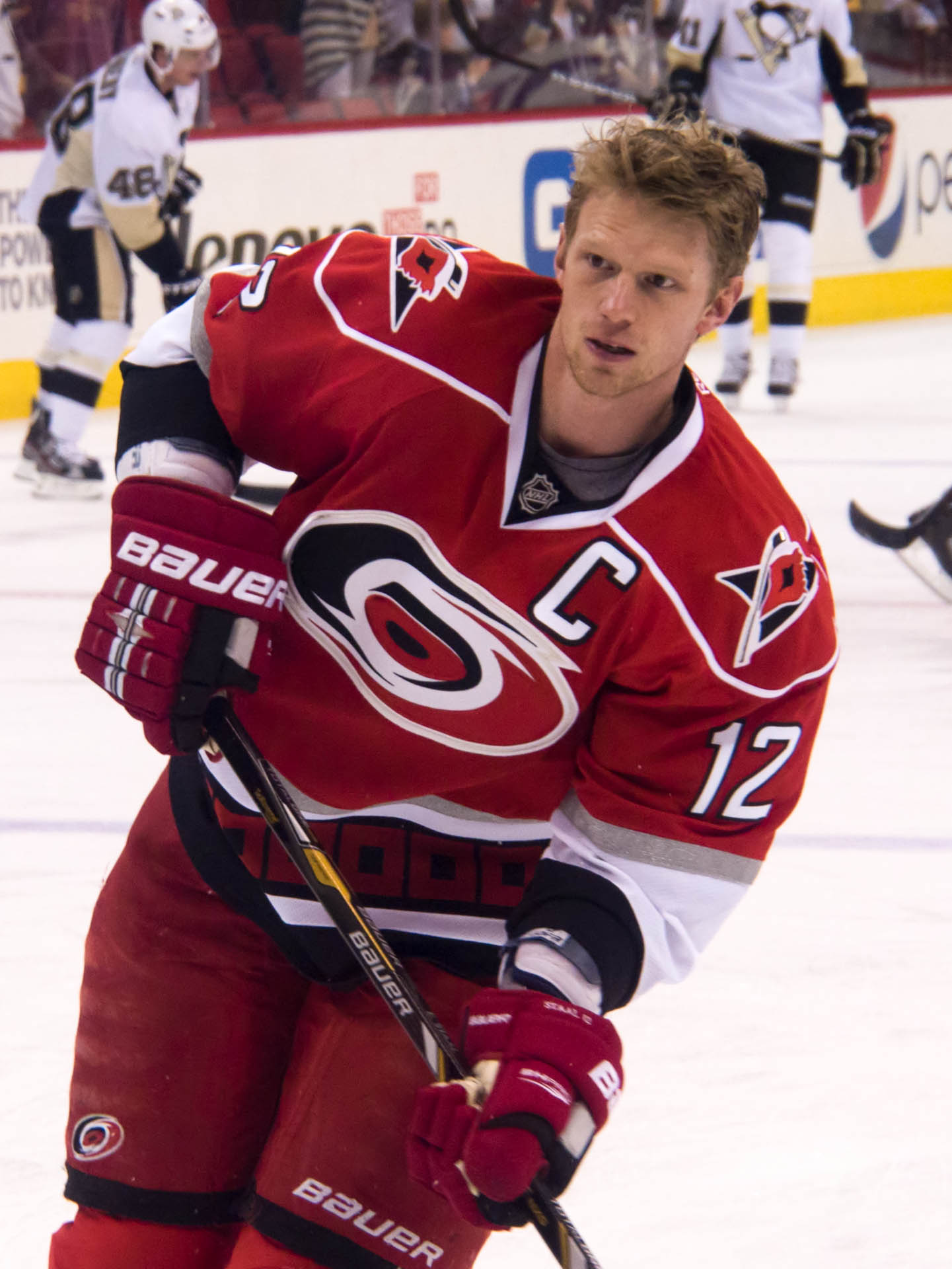
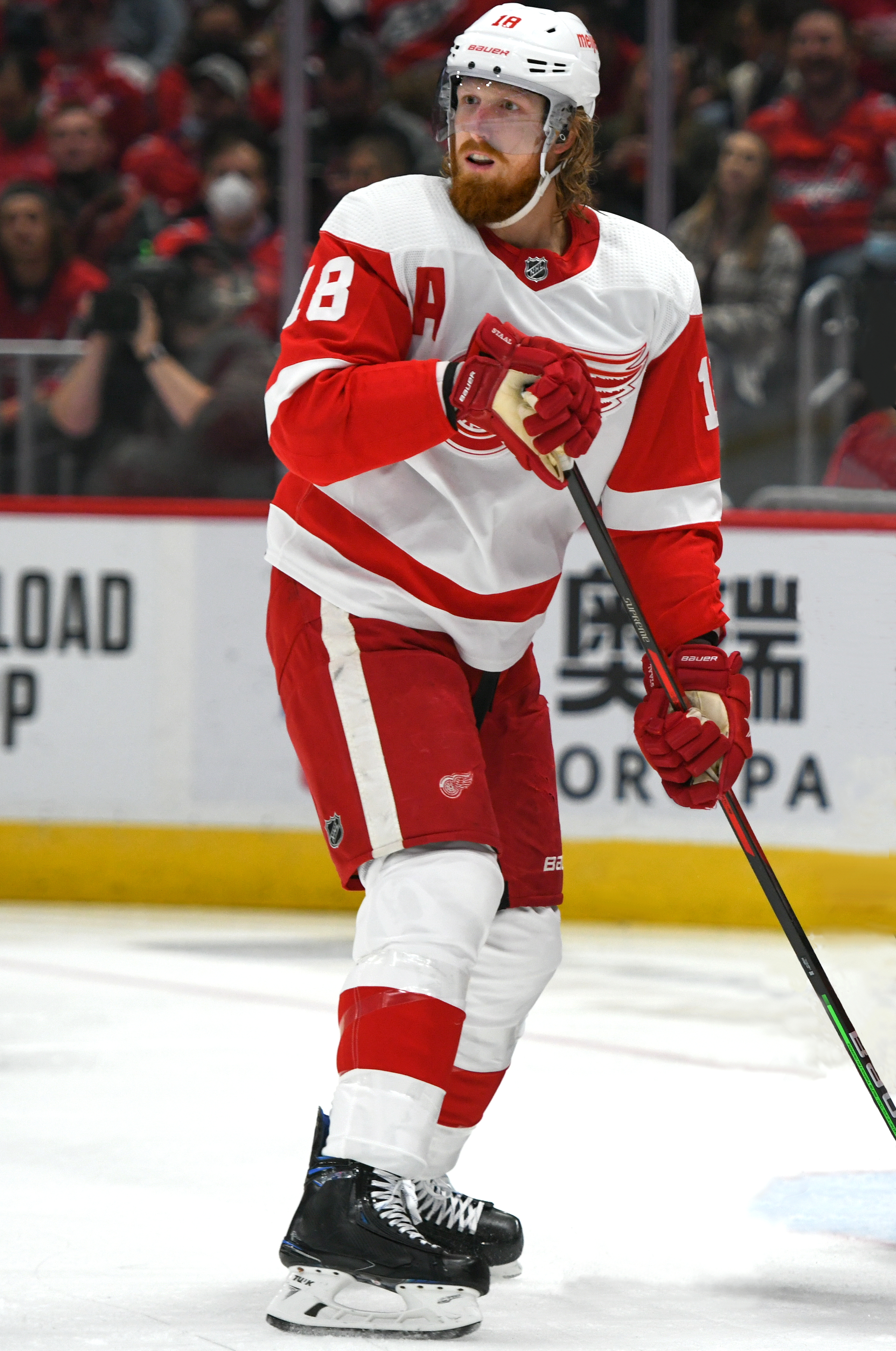
The Staal brothers – Jordan (left), Eric (center), and Marc (right) – are the only trio of brothers to each record 1,000 games played.

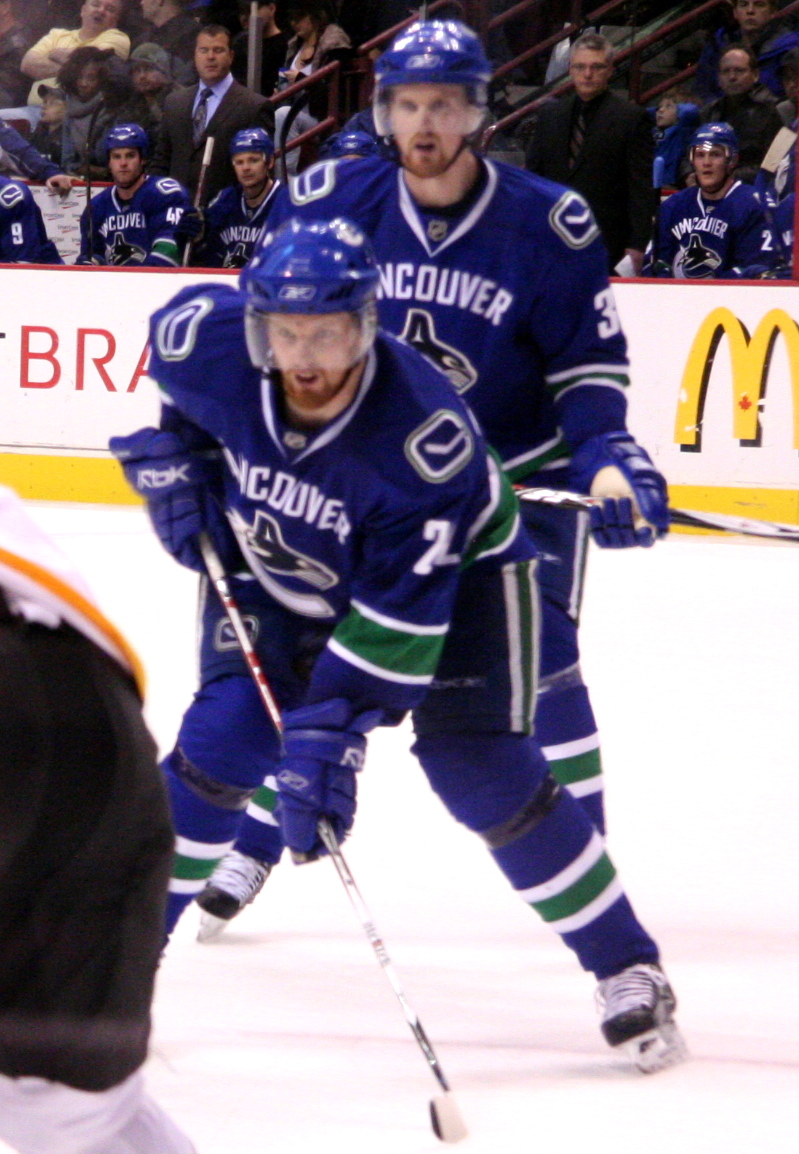
Twins Daniel Sedin (front, 1,306 games) and Henrik Sedin (1,330 games) are the only pair of brothers to play all their 1,000 games with one team.

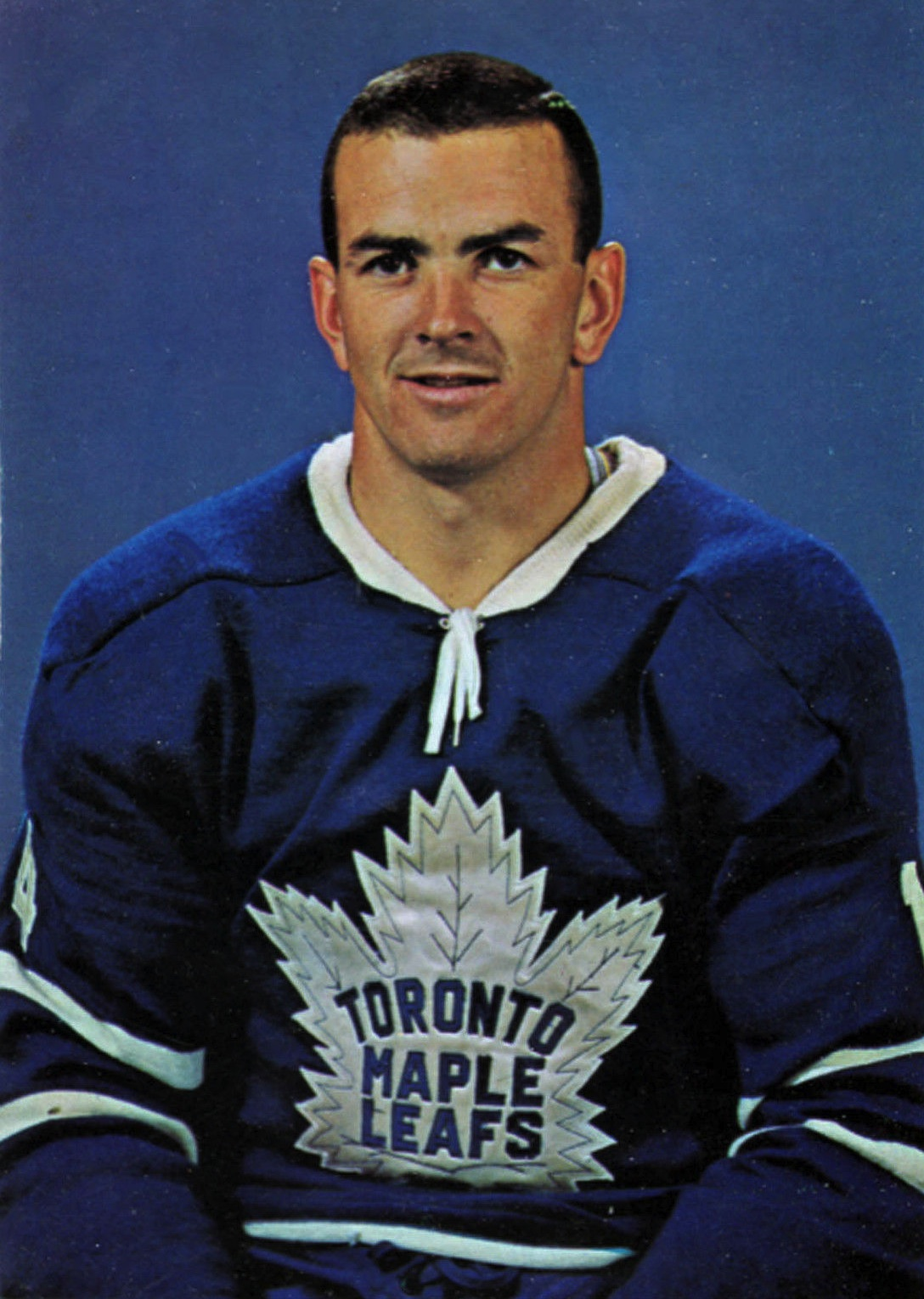
Dave Keon amassed 1,296 games in his career, and was one of the first players to reach the 1,000-game milestone.

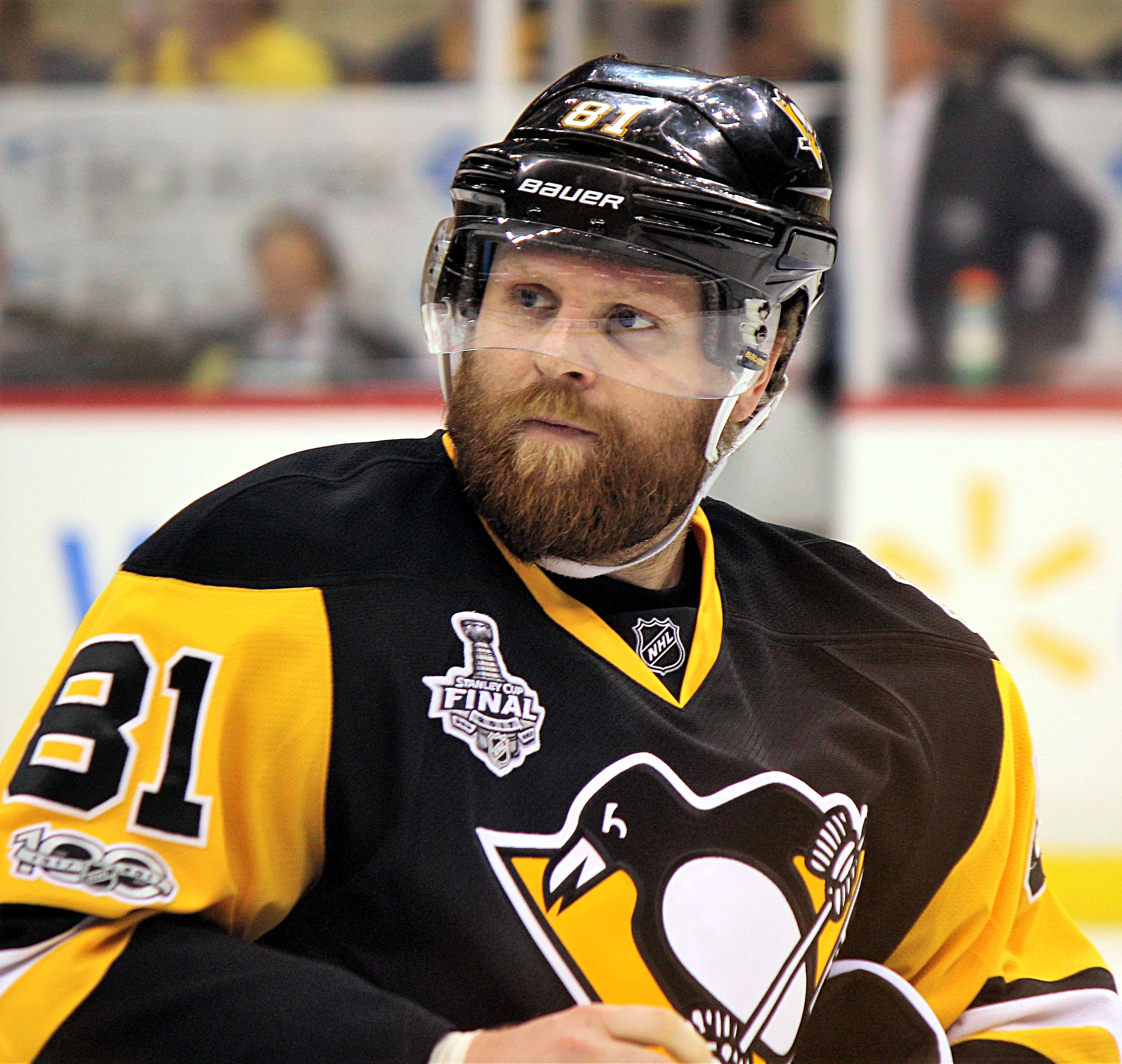
Phil Kessel, the NHL's leader in consecutive games played, appeared in 1,286 games.

Players with 1,250–1,499 games played
Rank	Player	Team(s)	Seasons	Games played	Ref(s)
26	Mike Modano†	Minnesota North Stars/Dallas, Detroit	21	1,499	
27	Phil Housley†	Buffalo, Winnipeg, St. Louis, Calgary, New Jersey, Washington, Chicago, Toronto	21	1,495	
28	Wayne Gretzky†	Edmonton, Los Angeles, St. Louis, N.Y. Rangers	20	1,487	
29	Rod Brind'Amour	St. Louis, Philadelphia, Carolina	21	1,484	
30	Doug Gilmour†	St. Louis, Calgary, Toronto, New Jersey, Chicago, Buffalo, Montreal	20	1,474	
31	Corey Perry↑	Anaheim, Dallas, Montreal, Tampa Bay, Chicago, Edmonton, **Los Angeles**	21	1,464	
32	Glen Wesley	Boston, Hartford/Carolina, Toronto	20	1,457	
33	Teemu Selanne†	Winnipeg, Anaheim, San Jose, Colorado Avalanche	21	1,451	
34	Tim Horton†	Toronto, N.Y. Rangers, Pittsburgh, Buffalo	24	1,445	
35	Mike Gartner†	Washington, Minnesota North Stars, N.Y. Rangers, Toronto, Phoenix	19	1,432	
T-36	Scott Mellanby	Philadelphia, Edmonton, Florida, St. Louis, Atlanta Thrashers	20	1,431	
T-36	Luc Robitaille†	Los Angeles, Pittsburgh, N.Y. Rangers, Detroit	19	1,431	
38	Pat Verbeek	New Jersey, Hartford, N.Y. Rangers, Dallas, Detroit	20	1,424	
39	Sidney Crosby↑	**Pittsburgh**	21	1,420	
40	Luke Richardson	Toronto, Edmonton, Philadelphia, Columbus, Tampa Bay, Ottawa	21	1,417	
41	Al MacInnis†	Calgary, St. Louis	23	1,416	
42	Harry Howell†	N.Y. Rangers, California/Oakland, Los Angeles	21	1,411	
43	Norm Ullman†	Detroit, Toronto	20	1,410	
44	Paul Coffey†	Edmonton, Pittsburgh, Los Angeles, Detroit, Hartford, Philadelphia, Chicago, Carolina, Boston	21	1,409	
45	Dale Hunter	Quebec, Washington, Colorado Avalanche	19	1,407	
46	Jordan Staal↑	Pittsburgh, **Carolina**	20	1,403	
47	Stan Mikita†	Chicago	22	1,396	
48	Roman Hamrlik	Tampa Bay, Edmonton, N.Y. Islanders, Calgary, Montreal, Washington, N.Y. Rangers	20	1,395	
49	Doug Mohns	Boston, Chicago, Minnesota North Stars, Atlanta Flames, Washington	22	1,391	
50	Larry Robinson†	Montreal, Los Angeles	20	1,384	
51	Trevor Linden	Vancouver, N.Y. Islanders, Montreal, Washington	19	1,382	
T-52	Vincent Damphousse	Toronto, Edmonton, Montreal, San Jose	18	1,378	
T-52	Dean Prentice	N.Y. Rangers, Boston, Detroit, Pittsburgh, Minnesota North Stars	22	1,378	
T-52	Joe Sakic†	Quebec/Colorado Avalanche	20	1,378	
55	Teppo Numminen	Winnipeg, Phoenix, Dallas, Buffalo	20	1,372	
56	Patrick Kane↑	**Chicago**, N.Y. Rangers, Detroit	19	1,369	
57	Eric Staal	Carolina, N.Y. Rangers, Minnesota Wild, Buffalo, Montreal, Florida	18	1,365	
58	Jeremy Roenick†	Chicago, Phoenix, Philadelphia, Los Angeles, San Jose	20	1,363	
59	Ron Stewart	Toronto, Boston, St. Louis, N.Y. Rangers, Vancouver, N.Y. Islanders	21	1,353	
60	Kirk Muller	New Jersey, Montreal, N.Y. Islanders, Toronto, Florida, Dallas	19	1,349	
61	Marcel Dionne†	Detroit, Los Angeles, N.Y. Rangers	18	1,348	
62	Mats Sundin†	Quebec, Toronto, Vancouver	18	1,346	
63	Claude Giroux↑	Philadelphia, Florida, **Ottawa**	19	1,345	
64	Adam Oates†	Detroit, St. Louis, Boston, Washington, Philadelphia, Anaheim, Edmonton	19	1,337	
65	Joe Pavelski	San Jose, Dallas	18	1,332	
T-66	Henrik Sedin†	Vancouver	17	1,330	
T-66	Ray Whitney	San Jose, Edmonton, Florida, Columbus, Detroit, Carolina, Phoenix, Dallas	22	1,330	
68	Marc-Edouard Vlasic↑	San Jose	19	1,323	
69	Jeff Carter	Philadelphia, Columbus, Los Angeles, Pittsburgh	19	1,321	
70	Guy Carbonneau†	Montreal, St. Louis, Dallas	19	1,318	
T-71	Red Kelly†	Detroit, Toronto	20	1,316	
T-71	Alexei Kovalev	N.Y. Rangers, Pittsburgh, Montreal, Ottawa, Florida	19	1,316	
73	Bobby Holik	Hartford, New Jersey, N.Y. Rangers, Atlanta Thrashers	18	1,314	
74	Marian Hossa†	Ottawa, Atlanta Thrashers, Pittsburgh, Detroit, Chicago	19	1,309	
75	Daniel Sedin†	Vancouver	17	1,306	
76	Sergei Gonchar	Washington, Boston, Pittsburgh, Ottawa, Dallas, Montreal	20	1,301	
T-77	Dustin Brown	Los Angeles	18	1,296	
T-77	Dave Keon†	Toronto, Hartford	18	1,296	
T-79	Patrice Bergeron†	Boston	19	1,294	
T-79	Andrew Cogliano	Edmonton, Anaheim, Dallas, San Jose, Colorado Avalanche	17	1,294	
T-79	Pierre Turgeon†	Buffalo, N.Y. Islanders, Montreal, St. Louis, Dallas, Colorado Avalanche	19	1,294	
82	Dainius Zubrus	Philadelphia, Montreal, Washington, Buffalo, New Jersey, San Jose	18	1,293	
83	Darryl Sydor	Los Angeles, Dallas, Columbus, Tampa Bay, Pittsburgh, St. Louis	18	1,291	
84	Mathieu Schneider	Montreal, N.Y. Islanders, Toronto, N.Y. Rangers, Los Angeles, Detroit, Anaheim, Atlanta Thrashers, Vancouver, Phoenix	21	1,289	
85	Nick Foligno↑	Ottawa, Columbus, Toronto, Boston, Chicago, **Minnesota Wild**	19	1,287	
86	Phil Kessel↑	Boston, Toronto, Pittsburgh, Arizona, Vegas	17	1,286	
87	Ken Daneyko	New Jersey	20	1,283	
88	Phil Esposito†	Chicago, Boston, N.Y. Rangers	18	1,282	
T-89	James Patrick	N.Y. Rangers, Hartford, Calgary, Buffalo	21	1,280	
T-89	Jean Ratelle†	N.Y. Rangers, Boston	21	1,280	
T-91	Drew Doughty↑	**Los Angeles**	18	1,279	
T-91	Bryan Trottier†	N.Y. Islanders, Pittsburgh	18	1,279	
93	Martin Gelinas	Edmonton, Quebec, Vancouver, Carolina, Calgary, Florida, Nashville	19	1,273	
T-94	Rob Blake†	Los Angeles, Colorado Avalanche, San Jose	21	1,270	
T-94	Ryan Smyth	Edmonton, N.Y. Islanders, Colorado Avalanche, Los Angeles	19	1,270	
T-96	Brett Hull†	Calgary, St. Louis, Dallas, Detroit, Phoenix	20	1,269	
T-96	Evgeni Malkin↑	**Pittsburgh**	20	1,269	
98	John Tavares↑	N.Y. Islanders, **Toronto**	17	1,266	
99	Martin Brodeur†	New Jersey, St. Louis	22	1,266	
100	Justin Williams	Philadelphia, Carolina, Los Angeles, Washington	19	1,264	
T-101	Bill Guerin	New Jersey, Edmonton, Boston, Dallas, St. Louis, San Jose, N.Y. Islanders, Pittsburgh	18	1,263	
T-101	Scott Niedermayer†	New Jersey, Anaheim	18	1,263	
103	Radek Dvorak	Florida, N.Y. Rangers, Edmonton, St. Louis, Atlanta Thrashers, Dallas, Anaheim, Carolina	18	1,260	
T-104	Ray Ferraro	Hartford, N.Y. Islanders, N.Y. Rangers, Los Angeles, Atlanta Thrashers, St. Louis	18	1,258	
T-104	Henri Richard†	Montreal	20	1,258	
106	Joe Nieuwendyk†	Calgary, Dallas, New Jersey, Toronto, Florida	20	1,257	
T-107	Duncan Keith†	Chicago, Edmonton	17	1,256	
T-107	Craig Ludwig	Montreal, N.Y. Islanders, Minnesota North Stars/Dallas	17	1,256	
T-107	Brian Rolston	New Jersey, Boston, Colorado Avalanche, Minnesota Wild, N.Y. Islanders	17	1,256	
T-110	Kevin Lowe†	Edmonton, N.Y. Rangers	19	1,254	
T-110	Zach Parise	New Jersey, Minnesota Wild, N.Y. Islanders, Colorado Avalanche	19	1,254	
112	Jamie Benn↑	**Dallas**	17	1,252	
113	Jari Kurri†	Edmonton, Los Angeles, N.Y. Rangers, Anaheim, Colorado Avalanche	17	1,251	

== 1,100–1,249 games played ==
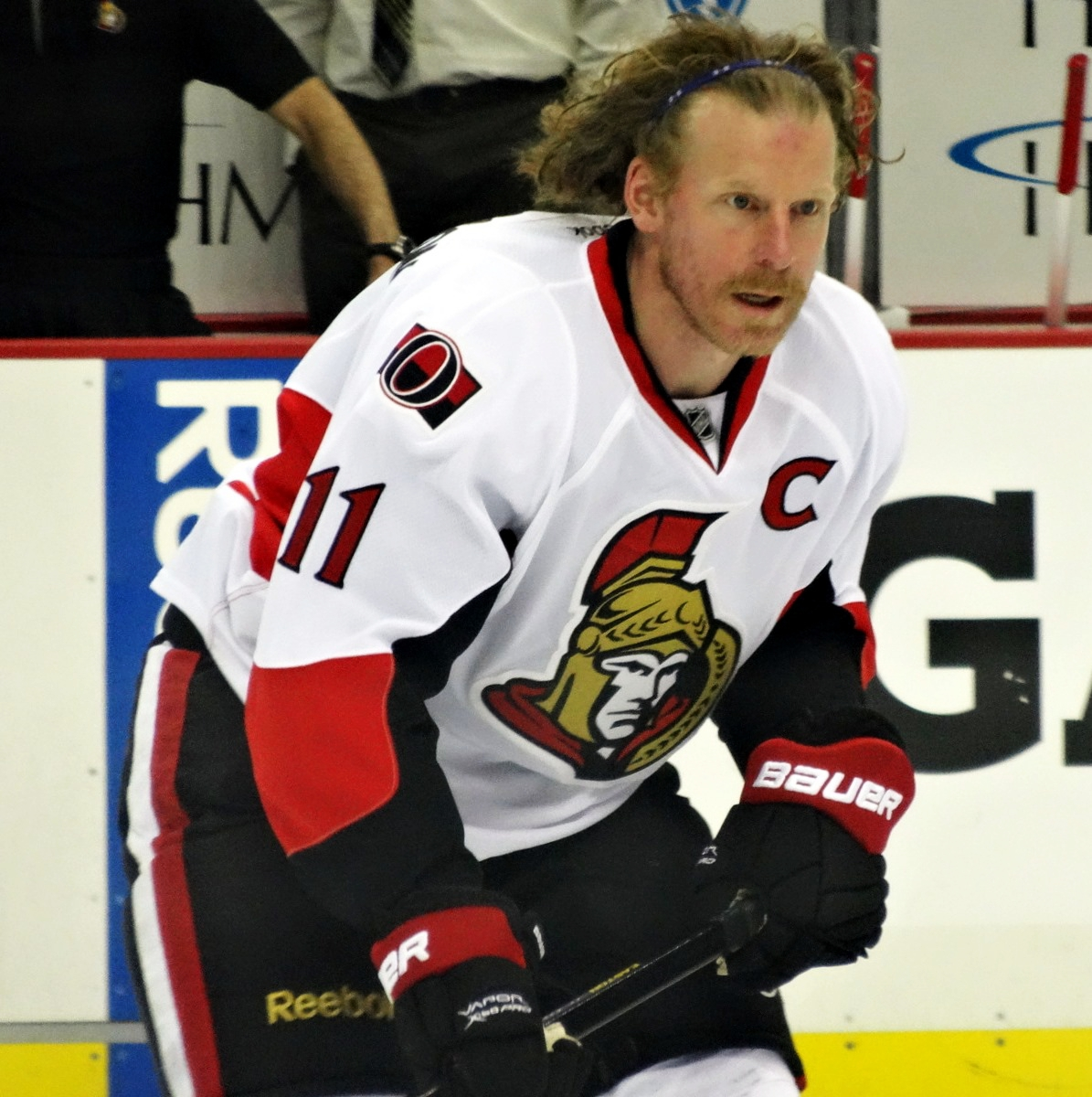
Daniel Alfredsson played in 1,246 NHL games.

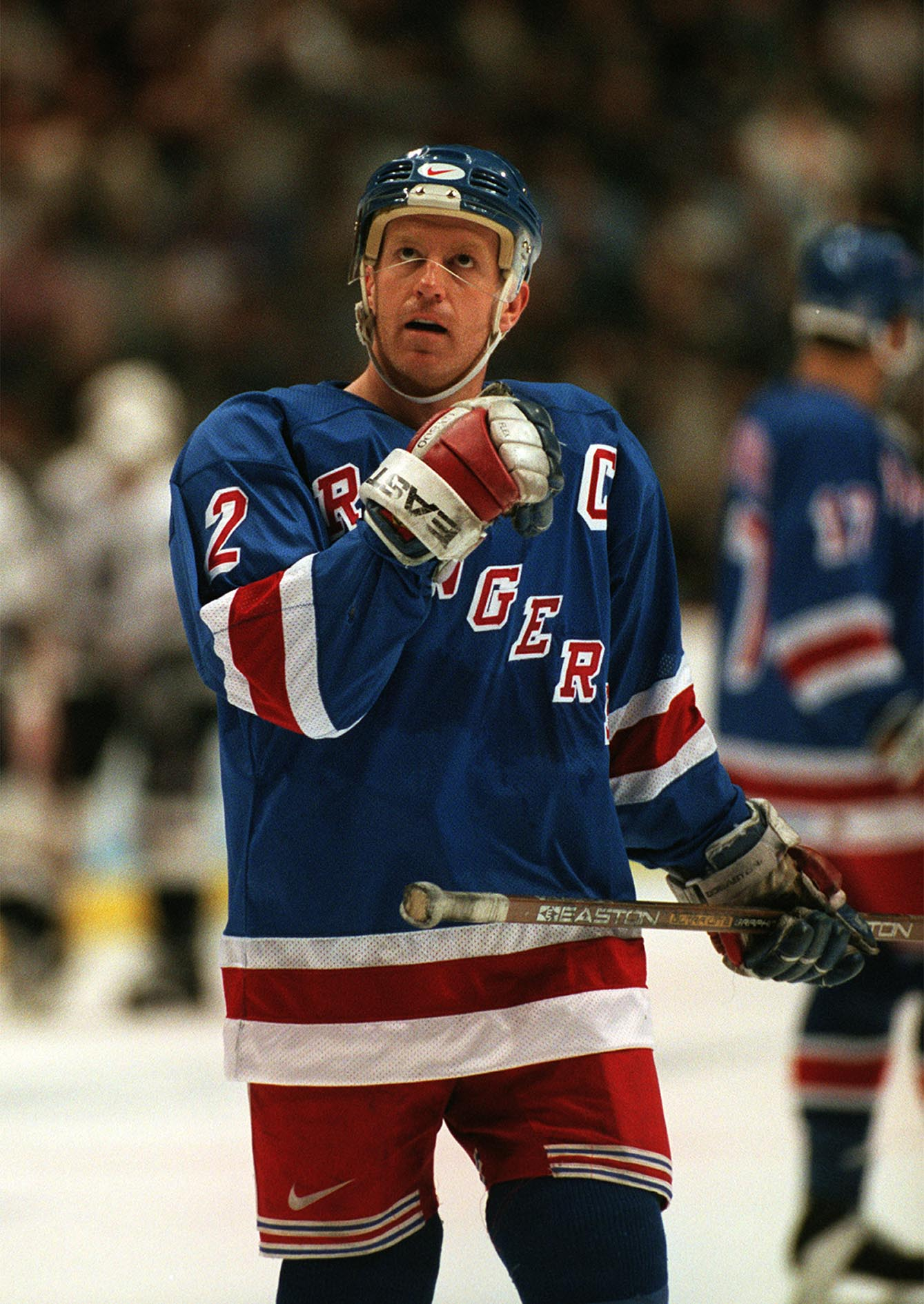
Brian Leetch played in 1,205 NHL games

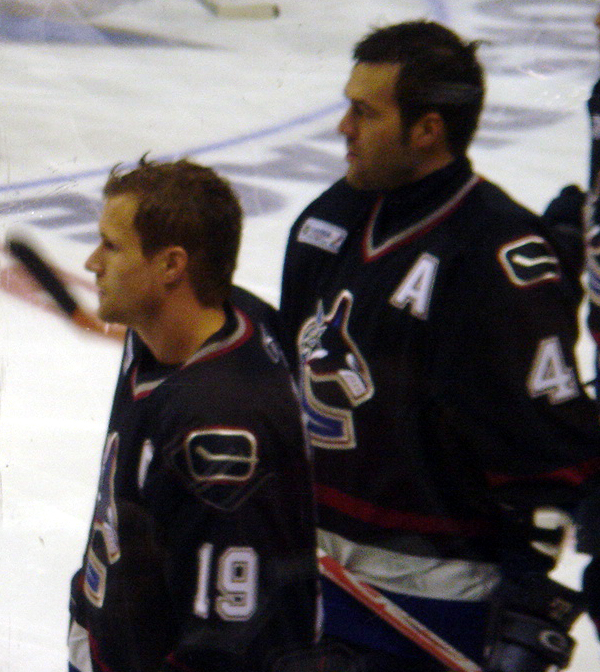
Markus Naslund (left) appeared in 1,117 NHL games, while his Canucks teammate Todd Bertuzzi appeared in 1,159 NHL games.

Players with 1,100–1,249 games played
Rank	Player	Team(s)	Seasons	Games played	Ref(s)
114	Scott Hartnell	Nashville, Philadelphia, Columbus	17	1,249	
T-115	Sergei Fedorov†	Detroit, Anaheim, Columbus, Washington	18	1,248	
T-115	Bill Gadsby†	Chicago, N.Y. Rangers, Detroit	20	1,248	
T-115	Jason Spezza	Ottawa, Dallas, Toronto	19	1,248	
T-118	Daniel Alfredsson†	Ottawa, Detroit	18	1,246	
T-118	Steven Stamkos↑	Tampa Bay, **Nashville**	19	1,246	
T-120	Jason Arnott	Edmonton, New Jersey, Dallas, Nashville, Washington, St. Louis	18	1,244	
T-120	Allan Stanley†	N.Y. Rangers, Chicago, Boston, Toronto, Philadelphia	21	1,244	
T-122	Jay Bouwmeester	Florida, Calgary, St. Louis	17	1,240	
T-122	Patrik Elias	New Jersey	20	1,240	
124	David Perron↑	St. Louis, Edmonton, Pittsburgh, Anaheim, Vegas, Detroit, Ottawa, **Dallas**	19	1,239	
125	Doug Weight	N.Y. Rangers, Edmonton, St. Louis, Carolina, Anaheim, N.Y. Islanders	19	1,238	
T-126	Kris Letang↑	**Pittsburgh**	20	1,235	
T-126	Steve Thomas	Toronto, Chicago, N.Y. Islanders, New Jersey, Anaheim, Detroit	20	1,235	
128	Ryan O'Reilly↑	Colorado Avalanche, Buffalo, St. Louis, Toronto, **Nashville**	17	1,233	
129	Dino Ciccarelli†	Minnesota North Stars, Washington, Detroit, Tampa Bay, Florida	19	1,232	
130	Olli Jokinen	Los Angeles, N.Y. Islanders, Florida, Phoenix, Calgary, N.Y. Rangers, Winnipeg, Nashville, Toronto, St. Louis	17	1,231	
131	Jack Johnson	Los Angeles, Columbus, Pittsburgh, N.Y. Rangers, Colorado Avalanche, Chicago	19	1,228	
132	Ed Westfall	Boston, N.Y. Islanders	18	1,226	
T-133	Sean O'Donnell	Los Angeles, New Jersey, Minnesota Wild, Boston, Phoenix, Anaheim, Los Angeles, Philadelphia, Chicago	17	1,224	
T-133	Gary Roberts	Calgary, Carolina, Toronto, Florida, Pittsburgh, Tampa Bay	21	1,224	
135	Brad McCrimmon	Boston, Philadelphia, Calgary, Detroit, Hartford, Phoenix	18	1,222	
136	Eric Nesterenko	Toronto, Chicago	21	1,219	
137	Claude Lemieux	Montreal, New Jersey, Colorado Avalanche, Phoenix, Dallas, San Jose	21	1,215	
138	Vincent Lecavalier	Tampa Bay, Philadelphia, Los Angeles	17	1,212	
139	Marcel Pronovost†	Detroit, Toronto	21	1,206	
140	Brian Leetch†	N.Y. Rangers, Toronto, Boston	18	1,205	
141	Keith Tkachuk†	Winnipeg, Phoenix, St. Louis, Atlanta Thrashers	18	1,201	
142	Owen Nolan	Quebec/Colorado Avalanche, San Jose, Toronto, Phoenix, Calgary, Minnesota Wild	18	1,200	
143	Denis Savard†	Chicago, Montreal, Tampa Bay	17	1,196	
T-144	Dave Babych	Winnipeg, Hartford, Vancouver, Philadelphia, Los Angeles	19	1,195	
T-144	Matt Duchene↑	Colorado Avalanche, Ottawa, Columbus, Nashville, **Dallas**	17	1,195	
T-144	Todd Marchant	N.Y. Rangers, Edmonton, Columbus, Anaheim	17	1,195	
147	John MacLean	New Jersey, San Jose, N.Y. Rangers, Dallas	18	1,194	
T-148	Marc Bergevin	Chicago, N.Y. Islanders, Hartford, Tampa Bay, Detroit, St. Louis, Pittsburgh, Vancouver	20	1,191	
T-148	Gilbert Perreault†	Buffalo	17	1,191	
T-150	George Armstrong†	Toronto	21	1,188	
T-150	Brian Bellows	Minnesota North Stars, Montreal, Tampa Bay, Anaheim, Washington	17	1,188	
T-150	Kevin Dineen	Hartford, Philadelphia, Carolina, Ottawa, Columbus	19	1,188	
T-150	Dale Hawerchuk†	Winnipeg, Buffalo, St. Louis, Philadelphia	16	1,188	
154	Lars Eller↑	St. Louis, Montreal, Washington, Colorado Avalanche, Pittsburgh, Ottawa, **Florida**	17	1,184	
T-155	Kelly Buchberger	Edmonton, Atlanta Thrashers, Los Angeles, Phoenix, Pittsburgh	18	1,182	
T-155	Vyacheslav Kozlov	Detroit, Buffalo, Atlanta Thrashers	18	1,182	
T-157	Frank Mahovlich†	Toronto, Detroit, Montreal	18	1,181	
T-157	Scott Young	Hartford, Pittsburgh, Quebec/Colorado Avalanche, Anaheim, St. Louis, Dallas	17	1,181	
159	Chris Phillips	Ottawa	17	1,179	
160	Bobby Carpenter	Washington, N.Y. Rangers, Los Angeles, Boston, New Jersey	19	1,178	
161	Milan Lucic	Boston, Los Angeles, Edmonton, Calgary	17	1,177	
162	Donnie Marshall	Montreal, N.Y. Rangers, Buffalo, Toronto	19	1,176	
163	Tony Amonte	N.Y. Rangers, Chicago, Phoenix, Philadelphia, Calgary	16	1,174	
164	Blake Wheeler	Boston, Atlanta Thrashers/Winnipeg, N.Y. Rangers	16	1,172	
165	Sylvain Cote	Hartford, Washington, Toronto, Chicago, Dallas	19	1,171	
166	Chris Pronger†	Hartford, St. Louis, Edmonton, Anaheim, Philadelphia	18	1,167	
167	Victor Hedman↑	**Tampa Bay**	17	1,164	
168	Mike Keane	Montreal, Colorado Avalanche, N.Y. Rangers, Dallas, St. Louis, Vancouver	16	1,161	
169	Bob Gainey†	Montreal	16	1,160	
T-170	Todd Bertuzzi	N.Y. Islanders, Vancouver, Florida, Detroit, Anaheim, Calgary	18	1,159	
T-170	John Carlson↑	Washington, Anaheim, **Tampa Bay**	17	1,159	
T-170	Erik Karlsson↑	Ottawa, San Jose, **Pittsburgh**	17	1,159	
T-173	Kris Draper	Winnipeg, Detroit	20	1,157	
T-173	Ryan Getzlaf	Anaheim	17	1,157	
T-173	Kevin Hatcher	Washington, Dallas, Pittsburgh, N.Y. Rangers, Carolina	17	1,157	
T-173	Eric Weinrich	New Jersey, Hartford, Chicago, Montreal, Boston, Philadelphia, St. Louis, Vancouver	17	1,157	
177	Shayne Corson	Montreal, Edmonton, St. Louis, Toronto, Dallas	19	1,156	
T-178	Adam Foote	Quebec/Colorado Avalanche, Columbus	19	1,154	
T-178	James van Riemsdyk↑	Philadelphia, Toronto, Boston, Columbus, Detroit	17	1,154	
180	Rob Niedermayer	Florida, Calgary, Anaheim, New Jersey, Buffalo	17	1,153	
T-181	Adam Graves	Detroit, Edmonton, N.Y. Rangers, San Jose	16	1,152	
T-181	Brad Marchand↑	Boston, **Florida**	17	1,152	
183	Leo Boivin†	Toronto, Boston, Detroit, Pittsburgh, Minnesota North Stars	19	1,150	
T-184	Garry Galley	Los Angeles, Washington, Boston, Philadelphia, Buffalo, N.Y. Islanders	17	1,149	
T-184	Jonathan Toews	Chicago, Winnipeg	16	1,149	
T-186	Mikael Backlund↑	**Calgary**	18	1,148	
T-186	Mark Giordano	Calgary, Seattle, Toronto	18	1,148	
T-186	Dan Hamhuis	Nashville, Vancouver, Dallas	16	1,148	
T-186	Borje Salming†	Toronto, Detroit	17	1,148	
T-190	Paul Stastny	Colorado Avalanche, St. Louis, Winnipeg, Vegas, Carolina	17	1,145	
T-190	Gary Suter	Calgary, Chicago, San Jose	17	1,145	
T-192	Bobby Clarke†	Philadelphia	15	1,144	
T-192	Rick Tocchet	Philadelphia, Pittsburgh, Los Angeles, Boston, Washington, Phoenix	18	1,144	
194	Eric Desjardins	Montreal, Philadelphia	17	1,143	
195	Jordan Eberle↑	Edmonton, N.Y. Islanders, **Seattle**	15	1,140	
196	Tyler Myers↑	Buffalo, Winnipeg, Vancouver, **Dallas**	17	1,139	
T-197	Oliver Ekman-Larsson↑	Phoenix/Arizona, Vancouver, Florida, **Toronto**	16	1,137	
T-197	Cliff Ronning	St. Louis, Vancouver, Phoenix, Nashville, Los Angeles, Minnesota Wild, N.Y Islanders	18	1,137	
T-199	Stu Barnes	Winnipeg, Florida, Pittsburgh, Buffalo, Dallas	16	1,136	
T-199	David Legwand	Nashville, Detroit, Ottawa, Buffalo	17	1,136	
T-199	Marc Staal	N.Y. Rangers, Detroit, Florida, Philadelphia	17	1,136	
202	Bryan McCabe	N.Y. Islanders, Vancouver, Chicago, Toronto, Florida, N.Y. Rangers	15	1,135	
203	Martin St. Louis†	Calgary, Tampa Bay, N.Y. Rangers	16	1,134	
204	Ron Hainsey	Montreal, Columbus, Atlanta Thrashers/Winnipeg, Carolina, Pittsburgh, Toronto, Ottawa	17	1,132	
T-205	Glenn Anderson†	Edmonton, Toronto, N.Y. Rangers, St. Louis	16	1,129	
T-205	David Ellett	Winnipeg, Toronto, New Jersey, Boston, San Jose	16	1,129	
T-207	Ed Jovanovski	Florida, Vancouver, Phoenix	18	1,128	
T-207	Jamie Macoun	Calgary, Toronto, Detroit	16	1,128	
T-207	Bob Nevin	Toronto, N.Y. Rangers, Minnesota North Stars, Los Angeles	18	1,128	
T-210	Bernie Nicholls	Los Angeles, N.Y. Rangers, Edmonton, New Jersey, Chicago, San Jose	18	1,127	
T-210	Murray Oliver	Detroit, Boston, Toronto, Minnesota North Stars	17	1,127	
T-212	Guy Lafleur†	Montreal, N.Y. Rangers, Quebec	17	1,126	
T-212	Brad Richards	Tampa Bay, Dallas, N.Y. Rangers, Chicago, Detroit	15	1,126	
214	Jean Beliveau†	Montreal	20	1,125	
T-215	Cam Fowler↑	Anaheim, **St. Louis**	16	1,124	
T-215	Saku Koivu	Montreal, Anaheim	18	1,124	
217	Luke Schenn↑	Toronto, Philadelphia, Los Angeles, Arizona, Anaheim, **Vancouver**, Tampa Bay, Nashville, Winnipeg, Buffalo	18	1,122	
218	Markus Naslund	Pittsburgh, Vancouver, N.Y. Rangers	15	1,117	
219	Don Sweeney	Boston, Dallas	16	1,115	
220	Brent Seabrook	Chicago	15	1,114	
T-221	Steve Duchesne	Los Angeles, Philadelphia, Quebec, St. Louis, Ottawa, Detroit	16	1,113	
T-221	Doug Harvey†	Montreal, N.Y. Rangers, Detroit, St. Louis	20	1,113	
T-221	Brad Park†	N.Y. Rangers, Boston, Detroit	17	1,113	
T-224	Lanny McDonald†	Toronto, Colorado Rockies, Calgary	16	1,111	
T-224	Brent Sutter	N.Y. Islanders, Chicago	18	1,111	
T-224	Dave Taylor	Los Angeles	17	1,111	
T-227	Andrew Brunette	Washington, Nashville, Atlanta Thrashers, Minnesota Wild, Colorado Avalanche, Chicago	16	1,110	
T-227	Jeff Skinner#	Carolina, Buffalo, Edmonton, San Jose	16	1,110	
T-229	Calle Johansson	Buffalo, Washington, Toronto	17	1,109	
T-229	Jamie Langenbrunner	Dallas, New Jersey, St. Louis	18	1,109	
T-229	Keith Yandle	Phoenix/Arizona, N.Y. Rangers, Florida, Philadelphia	16	1,109	
T-232	Adrian Aucoin	Vancouver, Tampa Bay, N.Y. Islanders, Chicago, Calgary, Phoenix, Columbus	18	1,108	
T-232	Hal Gill	Boston, Toronto, Pittsburgh, Montreal, Nashville, Philadelphia	16	1,108	
T-232	Vaclav Prospal	Philadelphia, Ottawa, Tampa Bay, Anaheim, N.Y. Rangers, Columbus	16	1,108	
T-232	Kimmo Timonen	Nashville, Philadelphia, Chicago	16	1,108	
T-236	Jason Chimera	Edmonton, Columbus, Washington, N.Y. Islanders, Anaheim	17	1,107	
T-236	Butch Goring	Los Angeles, N.Y. Islanders, Boston	16	1,107	
T-236	Derek Morris	Calgary, Colorado Avalanche, Phoenix, N.Y. Rangers, Boston	16	1,107	
T-239	Garry Unger	Toronto, Detroit, St. Louis, Atlanta Flames, Los Angeles, Edmonton	16	1,105	
T-239	Nicklas Backstrom#	Washington	17	1,105	
T-241	Mike Fisher	Ottawa, Nashville	18	1,104	
T-241	Geoff Sanderson	Hartford/Carolina, Vancouver, Buffalo, Columbus, Phoenix, Philadelphia, Edmonton, N.Y. Islanders	17	1,104	
243	Dave Manson	Chicago, Edmonton, Winnipeg, Phoenix, Montreal, Dallas, Toronto	16	1,103	
244	Brayden Schenn↑	Los Angeles, Philadelphia, St. Louis, **N.Y. Islanders**	17	1,102	
245	Pit Martin	Detroit, Boston, Chicago, Vancouver	17	1,101	

== 1,050–1,099 games played ==
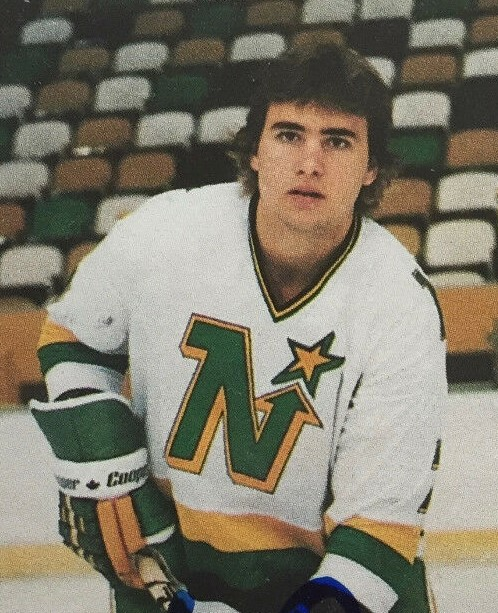
Neal Broten played in 1,099 games

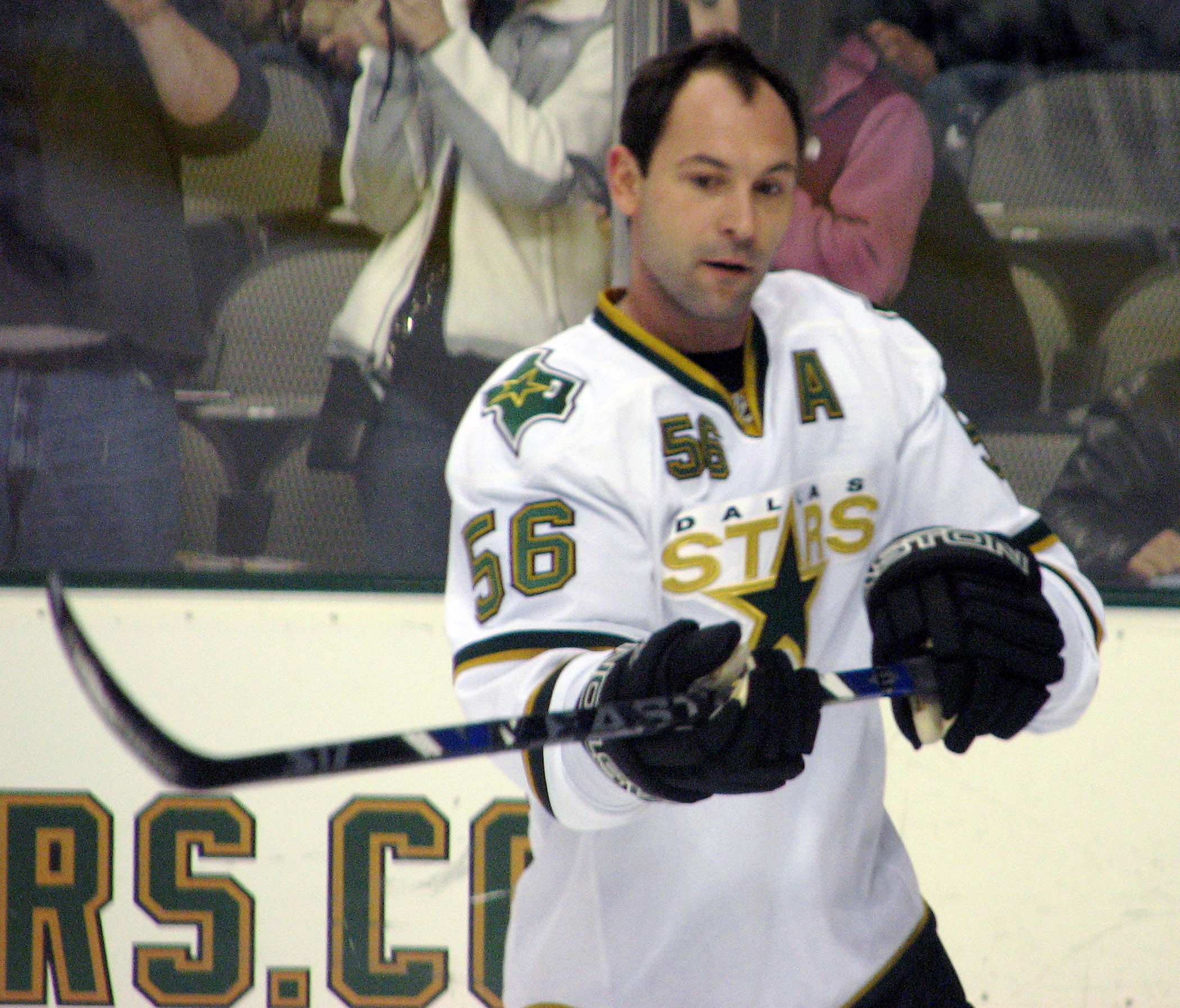
Sergei Zubov played in 1,068 games

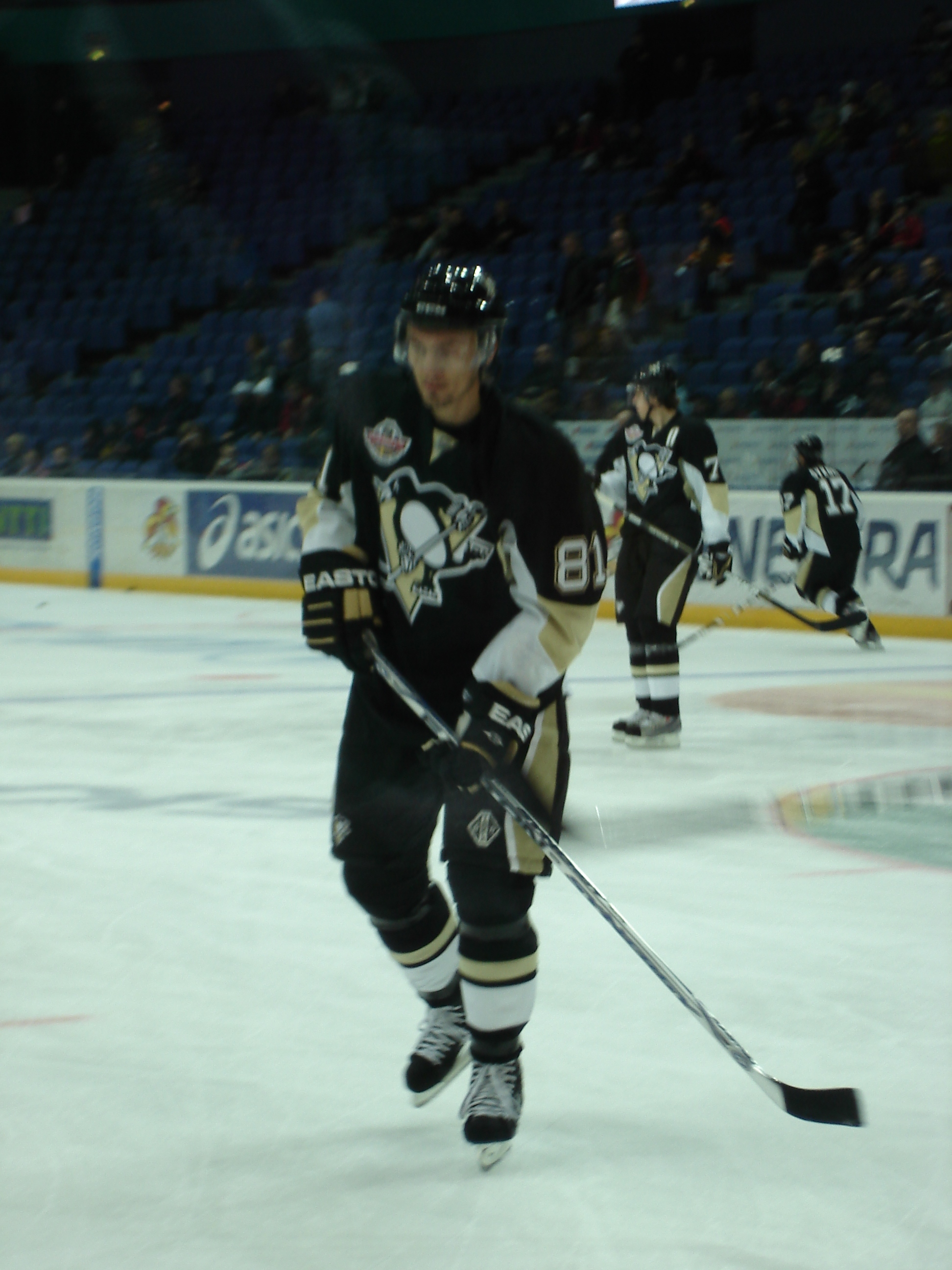
Miroslav Satan played in 1,050 games

Players with 1,050–1,099 games played
Rank	Player	Team(s)	Seasons	Games played	Ref(s)
T-246	Neal Broten	Minnesota North Stars/Dallas, New Jersey, Los Angeles	17	1,099	
T-246	Mike Ricci	Philadelphia, Quebec/Colorado Avalanche, San Jose, Phoenix	16	1,099	
248	Jay Wells	Los Angeles, Philadelphia, Buffalo, N.Y. Rangers, St. Louis, Tampa Bay	18	1,098	
T-249	Tom Fitzgerald	N.Y. Islanders, Florida, Colorado Avalanche, Nashville, Chicago, Toronto, Boston	17	1,097	
T-249	Gordie Roberts	Hartford, Minnesota North Stars, Philadelphia, St. Louis, Pittsburgh, Boston	15	1,097	
251	Darryl Sittler†	Toronto, Philadelphia, Detroit	15	1,096	
T-252	Dan Boyle	Florida, Tampa Bay, San Jose, N.Y. Rangers	17	1,093	
T-252	Craig MacTavish	Boston, Edmonton, N.Y. Rangers, Philadelphia, St. Louis	17	1,093	
T-252	Ron Sutter	Philadelphia, St. Louis, Quebec, N.Y. Islanders, Boston, San Jose, Calgary	19	1,093	
255	Chris Gratton	Tampa Bay, Philadelphia, Buffalo, Phoenix, Colorado Avalanche, Florida, Columbus	15	1,092	
256	Daymond Langkow	Tampa Bay, Philadelphia, Phoenix, Calgary	16	1,090	
T-257	Michel Goulet†	Quebec, Chicago	15	1,089	
T-257	Robyn Regehr	Calgary, Buffalo, Los Angeles	15	1,089	
259	Alex Tanguay	Colorado Avalanche, Calgary, Montreal, Tampa Bay, Arizona	16	1,088	
T-260	Alex Pietrangelo↑	St. Louis, **Vegas**	17	1,087	
T-260	Carol Vadnais	Montreal, Oakland, Calgary, Boston, N.Y. Rangers, New Jersey	17	1,087	
262	Brad Marsh	Atlanta Flames/Calgary, Philadelphia, Toronto, Detroit, Ottawa	15	1,086	
263	Alexei Zhitnik	Los Angeles, Buffalo, N.Y. Islanders, Philadelphia, Atlanta Thrashers	15	1,085	
T-264	Theoren Fleury	Calgary, Colorado Avalanche, N.Y. Rangers, Chicago	15	1,084	
T-264	Dave Lowry	Vancouver, St. Louis, Florida, San Jose, Calgary	19	1,084	
266	Ian Laperriere	St. Louis, Los Angeles, N.Y. Rangers, Colorado Avalanche, Philadelphia	16	1,083	
T-267	Brian Campbell	Buffalo, San Jose, Chicago, Florida	17	1,082	
T-267	Henrik Zetterberg	Detroit	15	1,082	
269	Peter Bondra	Washington, Ottawa, Atlanta Thrashers, Chicago	16	1,081	
270	Ulf Samuelsson	Hartford, Pittsburgh, N.Y. Rangers, Detroit, Philadelphia	16	1,080	
T-271	Scott Gomez	New Jersey, N.Y. Rangers, Montreal, San Jose, Florida, St. Louis, Ottawa	16	1,079	
T-271	Bob Pulford†	Toronto, Los Angeles	16	1,079	
273	Alex Goligoski	Pittsburgh, Dallas, Arizona, Minnesota Wild	17	1,078	
274	Bobby Smith	Minnesota North Stars, Montreal	15	1,077	
T-275	Nick Leddy↑	Chicago, N.Y. Islanders, Detroit, St. Louis, San Jose	16	1,074	
T-275	Mike Ribeiro	Montreal, Dallas, Washington, Phoenix, Nashville	17	1,074	
277	Kirk Maltby	Edmonton, Detroit	16	1,072	
T-278	Doug Bodger	Pittsburgh, Buffalo, San Jose, New Jersey, Los Angeles, Vancouver	16	1,071	
T-278	Murray Craven	Detroit, Philadelphia, Hartford, Vancouver, Chicago, San Jose	18	1,071	
T-280	Craig Ramsay	Buffalo	14	1,070	
T-280	Mike Ramsey	Buffalo, Pittsburgh, Detroit	14	1,070	
T-282	Andy Bathgate†	N.Y. Rangers, Toronto, Detroit, Pittsburgh	17	1,069	
T-282	Nick Schultz	Minnesota Wild, Edmonton, Columbus, Philadelphia	15	1,069	
T-284	Mike Knuble	Detroit, N.Y. Rangers, Boston, Philadelphia, Washington	16	1,068	
T-284	Ted Lindsay†	Detroit, Chicago	17	1,068	
T-284	Sergei Zubov†	N.Y. Rangers, Pittsburgh, Dallas	16	1,068	
T-287	Terry Harper	Montreal, Los Angeles, Detroit, St. Louis, Colorado Rockies	19	1,066	
T-287	Jean-Guy Talbot	Montreal, Minnesota North Stars, Detroit, St. Louis, Buffalo	17	1,066	
289	Rod Gilbert†	N.Y. Rangers	18	1,065	
290	Cal Clutterbuck	Minnesota Wild, N.Y. Islanders	17	1,064	
291	Bobby Hull†	Chicago, Winnipeg, Hartford	16	1,063	
T-292	Nazem Kadri↑	Toronto, **Colorado Avalanche**, Calgary	17	1,062	
T-292	Joe Mullen†	St. Louis, Calgary, Pittsburgh, Boston	17	1,062	
294	Bob Rouse	Minnesota North Stars, Washington, Toronto, Detroit, San Jose	17	1,061	
T-295	Mike Grier	Edmonton, Washington, Buffalo, San Jose	14	1,060	
T-295	Rick Nash	Columbus, N.Y. Rangers, Boston	15	1,060	
T-295	Jason Pominville	Buffalo, Minnesota Wild	16	1,060	
T-295	Denis Potvin†	N.Y. Islanders	15	1,060	
T-299	Trevor Daley	Dallas, Chicago, Pittsburgh, Detroit	16	1,058	
T-299	Justin Faulk↑	Carolina, St. Louis, **Detroit**	15	1,058	
T-299	Adam Henrique↑	New Jersey, Anaheim, Edmonton	16	1,058	
T-299	Marcus Johansson#	Washington, New Jersey, Boston, Buffalo, Minnesota Wild, Seattle	16	1,058	
T-299	Ryan McDonagh↑	N.Y. Rangers, **Tampa Bay**, Nashville	16	1,058	
T-299	Jakub Voracek	Columbus, Philadelphia	15	1,058	
T-305	Josh Bailey	N.Y. Islanders	15	1,057	
T-305	Andy Greene	New Jersey, N.Y. Islanders	16	1,057	
T-305	Kelly Miller	N.Y. Rangers, Washington	16	1,057	
T-305	Radim Vrbata	Colorado Avalanche, Carolina, Chicago, Phoenix/Arizona, Tampa Bay, Vancouver, Florida	16	1,057	
T-309	Greg Adams	New Jersey, Vancouver, Dallas, Phoenix, Florida	17	1,056	
T-309	Brenden Dillon↑	Dallas, San Jose, Washington, Winnipeg, **New Jersey**	15	1,056	
T-309	Valtteri Filppula	Detroit, Tampa Bay, Philadelphia, N.Y. Islanders	16	1,056	
T-309	Lyle Odelein	Montreal, New Jersey, Phoenix, Columbus, Chicago, Dallas, Florida, Pittsburgh	16	1,056	
T-309	Bryan Smolinski	Boston, Pittsburgh, N.Y. Islanders, Los Angeles, Ottawa, Chicago, Vancouver, Montreal	15	1,056	
T-309	Brad Stuart	San Jose, Boston, Calgary, Los Angeles, Detroit, Colorado Avalanche	16	1,056	
T-315	Randy Carlyle	Toronto, Pittsburgh, Winnipeg	18	1,055	
T-315	Scott Hannan	San Jose, Colorado Avalanche, Calgary, Washington, Nashville	16	1,055	
T-317	Craig Berube	Philadelphia, Toronto, Calgary, Washington, N.Y. Islanders	17	1,054	
T-317	Stephane Richer	Montreal, New Jersey, Tampa Bay, St. Louis, Pittsburgh	17	1,054	
319	Ivan Boldirev	Boston, California Golden Seals, Chicago, Atlanta Flames, Vancouver, Detroit	15	1,052	
T-320	Kyle Okposo	N.Y. Islanders, Buffalo, Florida	17	1,051	
T-320	Marc-Andre Fleury	Pittsburgh, Vegas, Chicago, Minnesota Wild	21	1,051	
T-322	Loui Eriksson	Dallas, Boston, Vancouver, Arizona	16	1,050	
T-322	Miroslav Satan	Edmonton, Buffalo, N.Y. Islanders, Pittsburgh, Boston	14	1,050	

== 1,000–1,049 games played ==
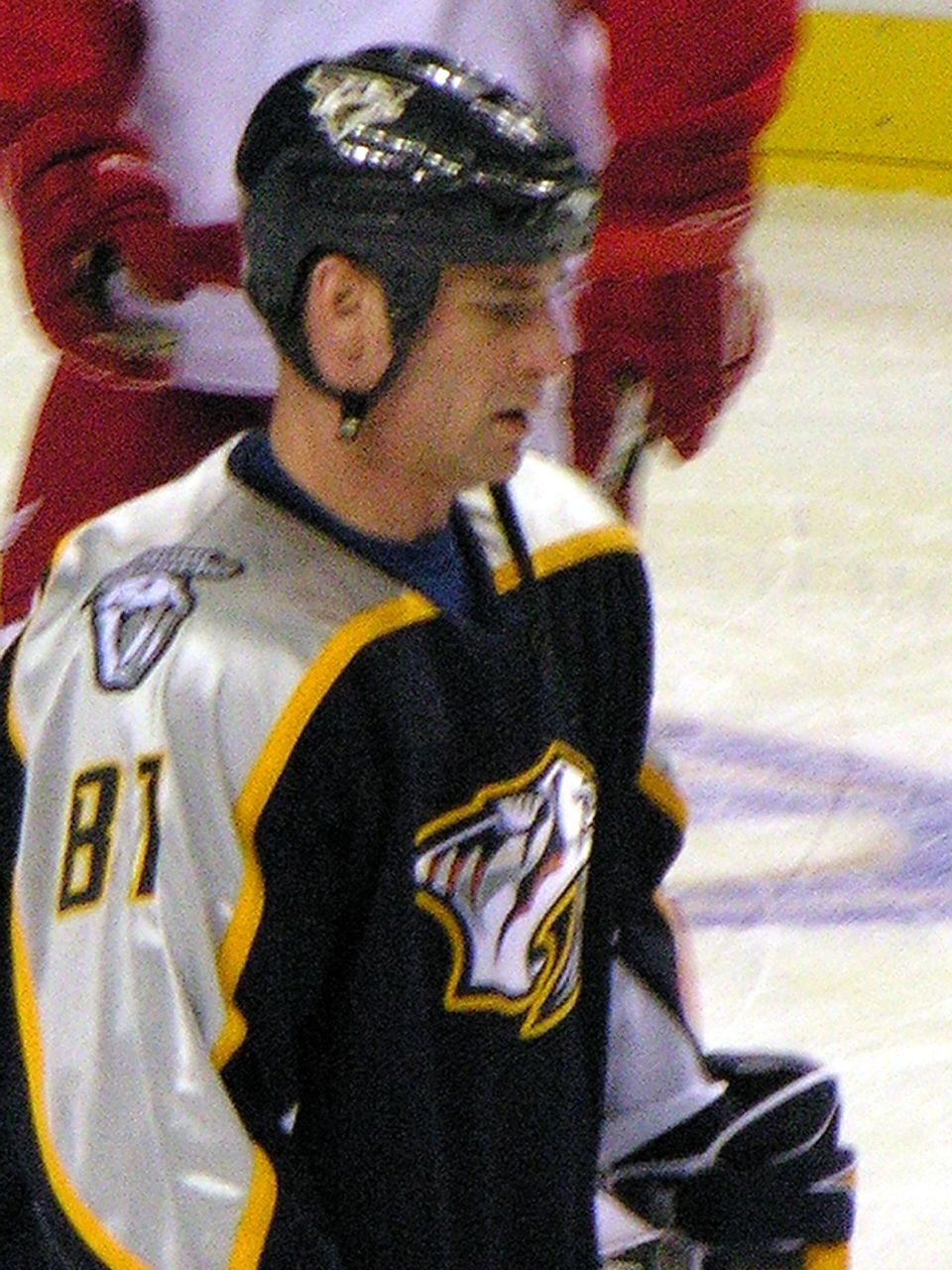
Mike Sillinger played for an NHL-record 12 franchises during his 1,049 games.

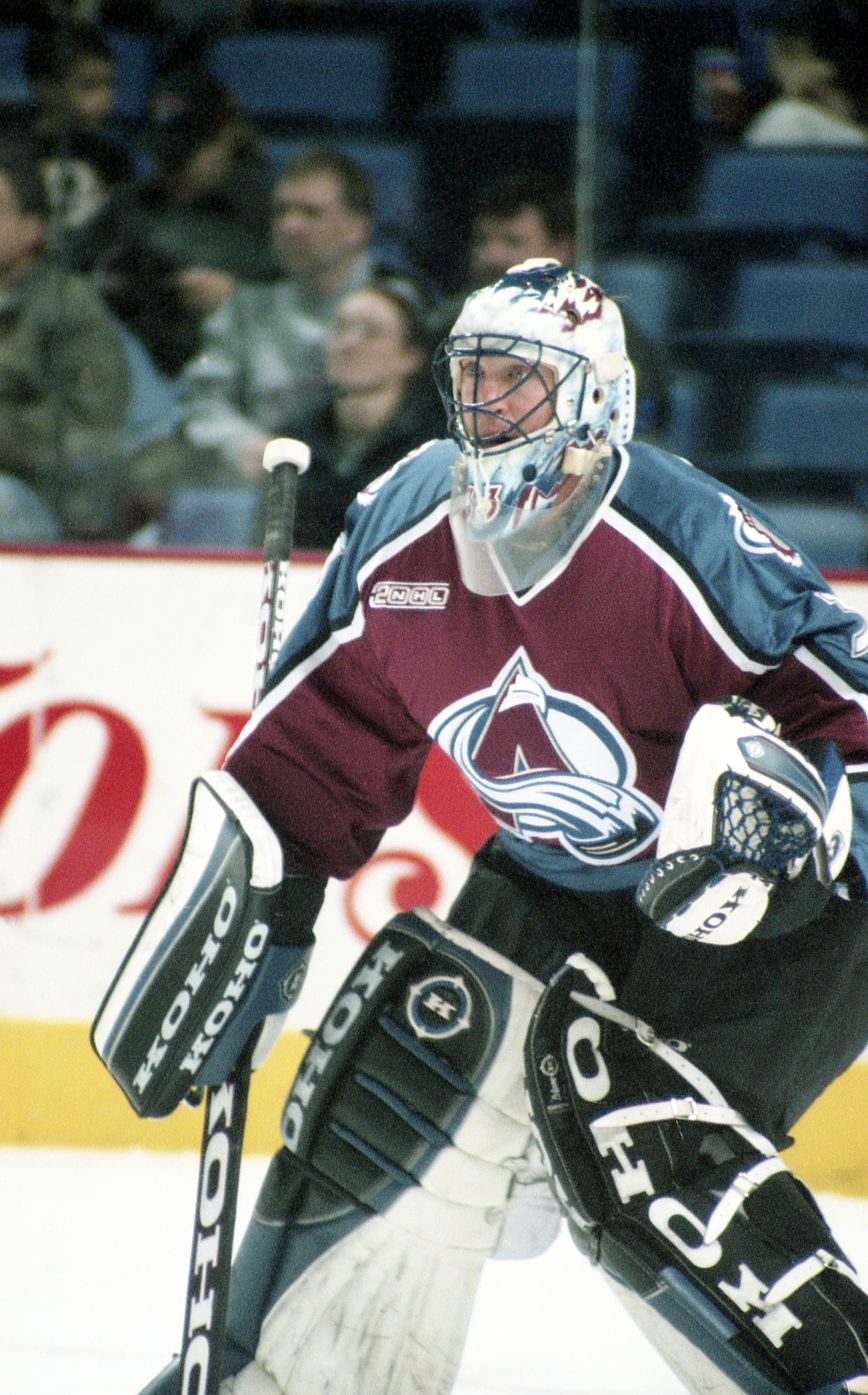
Patrick Roy became the first goaltender to play 1,000 games, finishing his career with 1,029.

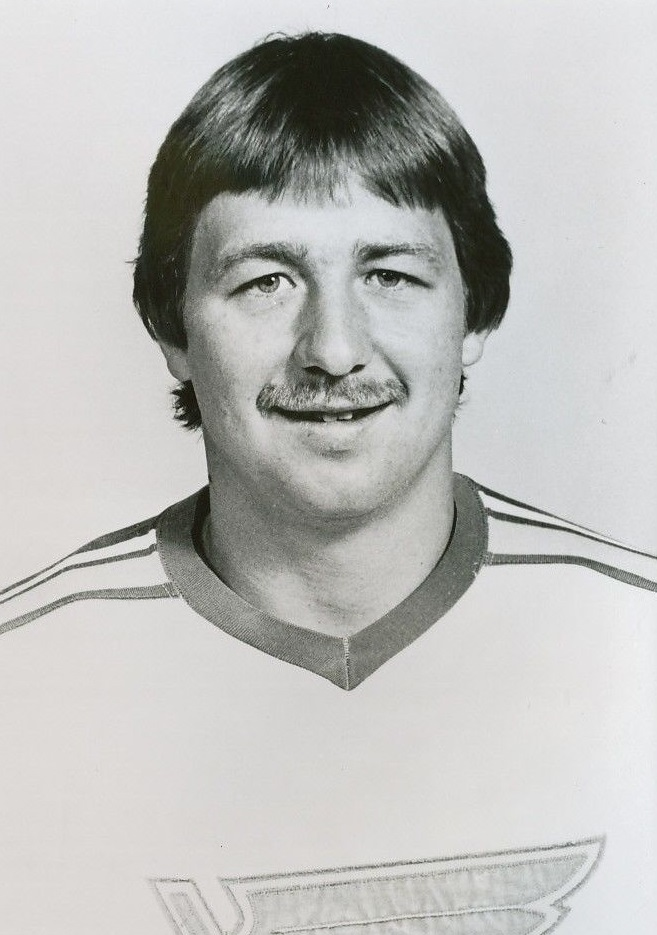
Bernie Federko, the only NHL player to play exactly 1,000 games.

Players with 1,000–1,049 games played
Rank	Player	Team(s)	Seasons	Games played	Ref(s)
324	Mike Sillinger	Detroit, Anaheim, Vancouver, Philadelphia, Tampa Bay, Florida, Ottawa, Columbus, Phoenix, St. Louis, Nashville, N.Y. Islanders	18	1,049	
T-325	Geoff Courtnall	Boston, Edmonton, Washington, St. Louis, Vancouver	17	1,048	
T-325	Jeff Petry↑	Edmonton, Montreal, Pittsburgh, Detroit, Florida, Minnesota Wild	16	1,048	
T-325	Dion Phaneuf	Calgary, Toronto, Ottawa, Los Angeles	14	1,048	
328	Eddie Shack	N.Y. Rangers, Toronto, Boston, Los Angeles, Buffalo, Pittsburgh	17	1,047	
T-329	Matt Cooke	Vancouver, Washington, Pittsburgh, Minnesota Wild	16	1,046	
T-329	Antoine Vermette	Ottawa, Columbus, Phoenix/Arizona, Chicago, Anaheim	14	1,046	
331	Derian Hatcher	Minnesota North Stars/Dallas, Detroit, Philadelphia	15	1,045	
T-332	Roberto Luongo†	N.Y. Islanders, Florida, Vancouver	19	1,044	
T-332	Rob Ramage	Colorado Rockies, St. Louis, Calgary, Toronto, Minnesota North Stars, Tampa Bay, Montreal, Philadelphia	15	1,044	
334	Sam Gagner	Edmonton, Arizona, Philadelphia, Columbus, Vancouver, Detroit, Winnipeg	17	1,043	
335	Brad May	Buffalo, Vancouver, Phoenix, Colorado Avalanche, Anaheim, Toronto, Detroit	18	1,041	
336	Serge Savard†	Montreal, Winnipeg	17	1,040	
337	Bret Hedican	St. Louis, Vancouver, Florida, Carolina, Anaheim	17	1,039	
338	Shea Weber†	Nashville, Montreal	16	1,038	
T-339	Dmitry Kulikov↑	**Florida**, Buffalo, Winnipeg, New Jersey, Edmonton, Minnesota Wild, Anaheim, Pittsburgh	17	1,037	
T-339	Stephane Quintal	Boston, St. Louis, Winnipeg, Montreal, N.Y. Rangers, Chicago	16	1,037	
T-339	Wayne Simmonds	Los Angeles, Philadelphia, Nashville, New Jersey, Buffalo, Toronto	15	1,037	
T-339	Travis Zajac	New Jersey, N.Y. Islanders	15	1,037	
T-343	Marian Gaborik	Minnesota Wild, N.Y. Rangers, Columbus, Los Angeles, Ottawa	17	1,035	
T-343	Mikko Koivu	Minnesota Wild, Columbus	16	1,035	
T-343	Brooks Orpik	Pittsburgh, Washington	16	1,035	
T-346	Ron Ellis	Toronto	16	1,034	
T-346	Trevor Lewis	Los Angeles, Winnipeg, Calgary	17	1,034	
T-348	Curtis Leschyshyn	Quebec/Colorado Avalanche, Washington, Hartford/Carolina, Minnesota Wild, Ottawa	16	1,033	
T-348	Harold Snepsts	Vancouver, Minnesota North Stars, Detroit, St. Louis	17	1,033	
T-350	Ralph Backstrom	Montreal, Los Angeles, Chicago	17	1,032	
T-350	Charlie Coyle↑	Minnesota Wild, Boston, Colorado Avalanche, **Columbus**	14	1,032	
T-350	Alex Killorn↑	Tampa Bay, **Anaheim**	14	1,032	
T-350	David Krejci	Boston	16	1,032	
T-354	Ryan Nugent-Hopkins↑	**Edmonton**	15	1,031	
T-354	Eddie Olczyk	Chicago, Toronto, Winnipeg, N.Y. Rangers, Los Angeles, Pittsburgh	16	1,031	
T-356	Dick Duff†	Toronto, N.Y. Rangers, Montreal, Los Angeles, Buffalo	18	1,030	
T-356	Alexander Edler	Vancouver, Los Angeles	17	1,030	
T-356	Roman Josi↑	**Nashville**	15	1,030	
T-356	Nino Niederreiter↑	N.Y. Islanders, Minnesota Wild, Carolina, Nashville, **Winnipeg**	15	1,030	
T-360	Russ Courtnall	Toronto, Montreal, Minnesota North Stars/Dallas, Vancouver, N.Y. Rangers, Los Angeles	16	1,029	
T-360	Patrick Roy†	Montreal, Colorado Avalanche	19	1,029	
T-360	Thomas Vanek	Buffalo, N.Y. Islanders, Montreal, Minnesota Wild, Detroit, Florida, Vancouver, Columbus	14	1,029	
T-363	Gaetan Duchesne	Washington, Quebec, Minnesota North Stars, San Jose, Florida	14	1,028	
T-363	Grant Ledyard	N.Y. Rangers, Los Angeles, Washington, Buffalo, Dallas, Vancouver, Boston, Ottawa, Tampa Bay	18	1,028	
T-363	Petr Svoboda	Montreal, Buffalo, Philadelphia, Tampa Bay	17	1,028	
T-363	John Tonelli	N.Y. Islanders, Calgary, Los Angeles, Chicago, Quebec	14	1,028	
367	Wayne Cashman	Boston	17	1,027	
T-368	Brian Gionta	New Jersey, Montreal, Buffalo, Boston	16	1,026	
T-368	Tomas Holmstrom	Detroit	15	1,026	
T-368	Chris Neil	Ottawa	15	1,026	
T-371	Donald Brashear	Montreal, Vancouver, Philadelphia, Washington, N.Y. Rangers	16	1,025	
T-371	Cory Stillman	Calgary, St. Louis, Tampa Bay, Carolina, Ottawa, Florida	16	1,025	
T-373	Jim Neilson	N.Y. Rangers, California/Cleveland	16	1,024	
T-373	Doug Wilson†	Chicago, San Jose	16	1,024	
T-375	Keith Acton	Montreal, Minnesota North Stars, Edmonton, Philadelphia, Washington, N.Y. Islanders	15	1,023	
T-375	Erik Johnson	St. Louis, Colorado Avalanche, Buffalo, Philadelphia	17	1,023	
T-375	Wade Redden	Ottawa, N. Y. Rangers, St. Louis, Boston	14	1,023	
T-378	Chris Kunitz	Anaheim, Atlanta Thrashers, Pittsburgh, Tampa Bay, Chicago	15	1,022	
T-378	Fredrik Olausson	Winnipeg, Edmonton, Pittsburgh, Detroit, Anaheim	18	1,022	
T-380	Tie Domi	Toronto, N.Y. Rangers, Winnipeg	15	1,020	
T-380	Milan Hejduk	Colorado Avalanche	14	1,020	
T-380	Don Lever	Vancouver, Atlanta Flames/Calgary, Colorado Rockies/New Jersey, Buffalo	15	1,020	
T-383	Keith Carney	Buffalo, Chicago, Phoenix, Anaheim, Vancouver, Minnesota Wild	16	1,018	
T-383	Mike Foligno	Detroit, Buffalo, Toronto, Florida	15	1,018	
T-383	Alexander Steen	Toronto, St. Louis	15	1,018	
T-386	Charlie Huddy	Edmonton, Los Angeles, Buffalo, St. Louis	17	1,017	
T-386	Petr Sykora	New Jersey, Anaheim, N.Y. Rangers, Edmonton, Pittsburgh, Minnesota Wild	15	1,017	
T-388	Brian Propp	Philadelphia, Boston, Minnesota North Stars, Hartford	15	1,016	
T-388	Phil Russell	Chicago, Atlanta Flames/Calgary, New Jersey, Buffalo	15	1,016	
T-388	Tyler Seguin↑	Boston, **Dallas**	16	1,016	
391	Andrew Cassels	Montreal, Hartford, Calgary, Vancouver, Columbus, Washington	16	1,015	
T-392	Derick Brassard	Columbus, N.Y. Rangers, Ottawa, Pittsburgh, Florida, Colorado Avalanche, N.Y. Islanders, Arizona, Philadelphia, Edmonton	16	1,013	
T-392	Paul Ranheim	Calgary, Hartford/Carolina, Philadelphia, Phoenix	15	1,013	
T-394	Adam Larsson↑	New Jersey, Edmonton, **Seattle**	15	1,012	
T-394	Jared Spurgeon↑	**Minnesota Wild**	16	1,012	
T-396	Steve Sullivan	New Jersey, Toronto, Chicago, Nashville, Pittsburgh, Phoenix	16	1,011	
T-396	Mika Zibanejad↑	Ottawa, **N.Y. Rangers**	15	1,011	
398	T. J. Oshie	St. Louis, Washington	16	1,010	
T-399	Laurie Boschman	Toronto, Edmonton, Winnipeg, New Jersey, Ottawa	14	1,009	
T-399	Eric Brewer	N.Y. Islanders, Edmonton, St. Louis, Tampa Bay, Anaheim, Toronto	16	1,009	
T-399	Patrice Brisebois	Montreal, Colorado Avalanche	18	1,009	
T-399	Dave Christian	Winnipeg, Washington, Boston, St. Louis, Chicago	15	1,009	
T-399	Craig Conroy	Montreal, St. Louis, Calgary, Los Angeles	16	1,009	
T-399	Dallas Drake	Winnipeg, Phoenix, St. Louis, Detroit	15	1,009	
T-399	Michal Handzus	St. Louis, Phoenix, Philadelphia, Chicago, Los Angeles, San Jose	14	1,009	
T-399	Glen Murray	Boston, Pittsburgh, Los Angeles	16	1,009	
T-407	Shawn Horcoff	Edmonton, Dallas, Anaheim	15	1,008	
T-407	Dave Lewis	N.Y. Islanders, Los Angeles, New Jersey, Detroit	15	1,008	
T-407	Bob Murray	Chicago	15	1,008	
T-407	Jason Smith	New Jersey, Toronto, Edmonton, Philadelphia, Ottawa	15	1,008	
411	Todd Gill	Toronto, San Jose, St. Louis, Detroit, Phoenix, Colorado Avalanche, Chicago	18	1,007	
T-412	Steve Larmer	Chicago, N.Y. Rangers	15	1,006	
T-412	Jim Roberts	Montreal, St. Louis	15	1,006	
T-414	Rick Middleton	N.Y. Rangers, Boston	14	1,005	
T-414	Claude Provost	Montreal	15	1,005	
416	Vic Hadfield	N.Y. Rangers, Pittsburgh	16	1,004	
T-417	Matt Stajan	Toronto, Calgary	15	1,003	
T-417	Ryan Walter	Washington, Montreal, Vancouver	15	1,003	
T-419	Evander Kane#	Atlanta Thrashers/Winnipeg, Buffalo, San Jose, Edmonton, Vancouver	17	1,001	
T-419	Ryan Kesler	Vancouver, Anaheim	15	1,001	
T-419	Andrew Ladd	Carolina, Chicago, Atlanta Thrashers/Winnipeg, N.Y. Islanders, Arizona	16	1,001	
T-419	Brock Nelson↑	N.Y. Islanders, **Colorado Avalanche**	13	1,001	
T-419	Tomas Plekanec	Montreal, Toronto	15	1,001	
T-419	Steve Staios	Boston, Vancouver, Atlanta Thrashers, Edmonton, Calgary, N.Y. Islanders	16	1,001	
425	Bernie Federko†	St. Louis, Detroit	14	1,000	

== 1,000th game played during the 2026–27 NHL season ==
Players with 1,000th NHL game in the 2026–27 NHL season
Player	Team(s)	Seasons	Date of 1,000th game	Ref(s)
Ian Cole↑	St. Louis, Pittsburgh, Columbus, Colorado Avalanche, Minnesota Wild, Carolina, Tampa Bay, Vancouver, Utah, **Chicago**	17	October 23, 2026	
Taylor Hall↑	Edmonton, New Jersey, Arizona, Buffalo, Boston, Chicago, **Carolina**	17	November 12, 2026	
Casey Cizikas↑	**N.Y. Islanders**	16	November 21, 2026	

== Players with 1,000 games played by franchise ==
The following is an index of players who have played at least 1,000 games with a single NHL franchise, as of the conclusion of the 2025–26 NHL season.

Key of colors and symbols
Color/symbol	Explanation
†	Inducted into the Hockey Hall of Fame
↑	Active with current team
	Active in NHL but not with the team
#	Active outside of NHL

=== Anaheim Ducks ===
Anaheim Ducks players with 1,000 or more NHL games played
Player	Seasons played with team	Games played	Notes	Ref(s)
Ryan Getzlaf	17	1,157	Played entire career with the team (2005–2022)	

The Ducks' active leader in games played is Troy Terry, who has played 488 games with the team.

=== Arizona Coyotes ===
The Coyotes franchise suspended operations at the conclusion of the 2023–24 NHL season, making it the only defunct franchise with a 1,000-game player. The franchise was previously known as the Phoenix Coyotes from 1996 to 2014.

Arizona Coyotes players with 1,000 or more NHL games played
Player	Seasons played with team	Games played	Notes	Ref(s)
Shane Doan	20	1,466	(1996–2017)	

=== Boston Bruins ===
Boston Bruins players with 1,000 or more NHL games played
Player	Seasons played with team	Games played	Notes	Ref(s)
Ray Bourque†	21	1,518	(1979–2000)	
Johnny Bucyk†	21	1,436	(1957–1978)	
Patrice Bergeron†	19	1,294	Played entire career with the team (2003–2023)	
Brad Marchand	16	1,090	(2009–2025)	
Don Sweeney	15	1,052	(1988–2003)	
David Krejci	16	1,032	Played entire career with the team (2006–2021, 2022–2023); Played overseas during the 2021–22 NHL season	
Wayne Cashman	17	1,027	Played entire career with the team (1964–1965, 1967–1983)	
Zdeno Chara†	14	1,023	(2006–2020)	

The Bruins' active leader in games played is David Pastrnak, who has played 833 games with the team.

=== Buffalo Sabres ===
Buffalo Sabres players with 1,000 or more NHL games played
Player	Seasons played with team	Games played	Notes	Ref(s)
Gilbert Perreault†	17	1,191	Played entire career with the team (1970–1987)	
Craig Ramsay	14	1,070	Played entire career with the team (1971–1985)	

The Sabres' active leader in games played is Rasmus Dahlin, who has played 586 games with the team.

=== Calgary Flames ===
Calgary Flames players with 1,000 or more NHL games played
Player	Seasons played with team	Games played	Notes	Ref(s)
Jarome Iginla †	16	1,219	Debuted during the 1996 Stanley Cup playoffs First regular season game came in the 1996–97 season (1996–2013)	
Mikael Backlund↑	18	1,148	Played entire career with the team (2009–present)	

The franchise was originally known as the Atlanta Flames from 1972 to 1980.

=== Carolina Hurricanes ===
Carolina Hurricanes players with 1,000 or more NHL games played
Player	Seasons played with team	Games played	Notes	Ref(s)
Ron Francis†	16	1,186	Hartford (1981–1991); Carolina (1998–2004)	

The Hurricanes' active leader in games played is Jordan Staal, who has played 972 games with the team. The franchise was originally known as the Hartford Whalers from 1979 to 1997.

=== Chicago Blackhawks ===
Chicago Blackhawks players with 1,000 or more NHL games played
Player	Seasons played with team	Games played	Notes	Ref(s)
Stan Mikita†	22	1,396	Played entire career with the team (1958–1980)	
Duncan Keith†	16	1,192	(2005–2021)	
Patrick Kane↑	16	1,161	Played with the team on two separate occasions (2007–2023, 2026–present)	
Brent Seabrook	15	1,114	Played entire career with the team (2005–2020)	
Jonathan Toews	15	1,067	(2007–2023); Missed the entire 2020–21 season due to illness.	
Bobby Hull†	15	1,036	(1957–1972)	
Eric Nesterenko	16	1,013	(1956–1972)	
Bob Murray	15	1,008	Played entire career with the team (1975–1990)	

=== Colorado Avalanche ===
Colorado Avalanche players with 1,000 or more NHL games played
Player	Seasons played with team	Games played	Notes	Ref(s)
Joe Sakic†	20	1,378	Quebec (1988–1995); Colorado (1995–2009); Played entire career with the team	
Milan Hejduk	14	1,020	Played entire career with the team (1998–2013)	

The Avalanche's active leader in games played is Nathan MacKinnon, who has played 950 games with the team. The franchise was originally known as the Quebec Nordiques from 1979 to 1995.

=== Columbus Blue Jackets ===
No player has played 1,000 games with the franchise. The Blue Jackets' current leader in games played is Boone Jenner, who played 808 games with the team. The Blue Jackets' active leader in games played is Zach Werenski, who has played 642 games with the team.

=== Dallas Stars ===
Dallas Stars players with 1,000 or more NHL games played
Player	Seasons played with team	Games played	Notes	Ref(s)
Mike Modano†	20	1,459	Minnesota North Stars (1989–1993); Dallas (1993–2010); Debuted during the 1989 Stanley Cup playoffs First regular season game came in the 1989–90 season	
Jamie Benn↑	17	1,252	Played entire career with the team (2009–present)	

The franchise was originally known as the Minnesota North Stars from 1967 to 1993, and additionally merged with the Cleveland Barons (themselves originally known as the California/Oakland (Golden) Seals from 1967 to 1976) in 1978.

=== Detroit Red Wings ===
Detroit Red Wings players with 1,000 or more NHL games played
Player	Seasons played with team	Games played	Notes	Ref(s)
Gordie Howe†	25	1,687	Most games played with one franchise (1946–1971)	
Nicklas Lidstrom†	20	1,564	Played entire career with the team (1991–2012)	
Alex Delvecchio†	24	1,549	Played entire career with the team (1950–1974)	
Steve Yzerman†	22	1,514	Played entire career with the team (1983–2006)	
Kris Draper	17	1,137	(1993–2011)	
Henrik Zetterberg	15	1,082	Played entire career with the team (2002–2018)	
Tomas Holmstrom	15	1,026	Played entire career with the team (1996–2012)	

The Red Wings' active leader in games played is Dylan Larkin, who has played 808 games with the team.

=== Edmonton Oilers ===
Edmonton Oilers players with 1,000 or more NHL games played
Player	Seasons played with team	Games played	Notes	Ref(s)
Kevin Lowe†	15	1,037	Played with the team on two separate occasions (1979–1992, 1996–1998)	
Ryan Nugent-Hopkins↑	15	1,031	Played entire career with the team (2011–present)	

=== Florida Panthers ===
No player has played 1,000 games with the franchise. The Panthers' all-time and active leaders in games played are Aleksander Barkov and Aaron Ekblad, who have both played 804 games with the team.

=== Los Angeles Kings ===
Los Angeles Kings players with 1,000 or more NHL games played
Player	Seasons played with team	Games played	Notes	Ref(s)
Anze Kopitar	20	1,521	Played entire career with the team (2006–2026)	
Dustin Brown	18	1,296	Played entire career with the team (2003–2022)	
Drew Doughty↑	18	1,279	Played entire career with the team (2008–present)	
Dave Taylor	17	1,111	Played entire career with the team (1977–1994)	
Luc Robitaille†	14	1,077	Played with the team on three separate occasions (1986–1994, 1997–2001, 2003–2006)	

=== Minnesota Wild ===
Minnesota Wild players with 1,000 or more NHL games played
Player	Seasons played with team	Games played	Notes	Ref(s)
Mikko Koivu	15	1,028	(2005–2020)	
Jared Spurgeon↑	16	1,012	Played entire career with the team (2010–present)	

=== Montreal Canadiens ===
Montreal Canadiens players with 1,000 or more NHL games played
Player	Seasons played with team	Games played	Notes	Ref(s)
Henri Richard†	20	1,258	Played entire career with the team (1955–1975)	
Larry Robinson†	17	1,202	(1972–1989)	
Bob Gainey†	16	1,160	Played entire career with the team (1973–1989)	
Jean Beliveau†	20	1,125	Played entire career with the team (1950–51, 1952–1971)	
Claude Provost	15	1,005	Played entire career with the team (1955–1970)	

The Canadiens' active leader in games played is Nick Suzuki, who has played 537 games with the team.

=== Nashville Predators ===
Nashville Predators players with 1,000 or more NHL games played
Player	Seasons played with team	Games played	Notes	Ref(s)
Roman Josi↑	15	1,030	Played entire career with the team (2011–present)	

=== New Jersey Devils ===
New Jersey Devils players with 1,000 or more NHL games played
Player	Seasons played with team	Games played	Notes	Ref(s)
Ken Daneyko	20	1,283	Played entire career with the team (1983–2003)	
Martin Brodeur†	21	1,259	(1991–2014)	
Patrik Elias	20	1,240	Played entire career with the team (1995–2016)	
Travis Zajac	15	1,024	(2005–2020)	

The Devils' active leader in games played is Jesper Bratt, who has played 634 games with the team. The franchise was previously known as the Colorado Rockies from 1976 to 1982, and the Kansas City Scouts from 1974 to 1976.

=== New York Islanders ===
New York Islanders players with 1,000 or more NHL games played
Player	Seasons played with team	Games played	Notes	Ref(s)
Bryan Trottier†	15	1,123	(1975–1990)	
Denis Potvin†	15	1,060	Played entire career with the team (1973–1988)	
Josh Bailey	15	1,057	Played entire career with the team (2008–2023)	

The Islanders' active leader in games played is Casey Cizikas, who has played 978 games with the team.

=== New York Rangers ===
New York Rangers players with 1,000 or more NHL games played
Player	Seasons played with team	Games played	Notes	Ref(s)
Harry Howell†	17	1,160	(1952–1969)	
Brian Leetch†	17	1,129	(1987–2004)	
Rod Gilbert†	18	1,065	Played entire career with the team (1960–1978)	

The Rangers' active leader in games played is Mika Zibanejad, who has played 730 games with the team.

=== Ottawa Senators ===
Ottawa Senators players with 1,000 or more NHL games played
Player	Seasons played with team	Games played	Notes	Ref(s)
Chris Phillips	17	1,179	Played entire career with the team (1997–2015)	
Daniel Alfredsson†	17	1,178	(1995–2013)	
Chris Neil	15	1,026	Played entire career with the team (2001–2017)	

The Senators' active leader in games played is Thomas Chabot, who has played 569 games with the team.

=== Philadelphia Flyers ===
Philadelphia Flyers players with 1,000 or more NHL games played
Player	Seasons played with team	Games played	Notes	Ref(s)
Bobby Clarke†	15	1,144	Played entire career with the team (1969–1984)	
Claude Giroux	15	1,000	(2007–2022)	

The Flyers' active leader in games played is Sean Couturier, who has played 952 games with the team.

=== Pittsburgh Penguins ===
Pittsburgh Penguins players with 1,000 or more NHL games played
Player	Seasons played with team	Games played	Notes	Ref(s)
Sidney Crosby↑	21	1,420	Played entire career with the team (2005–present)	
Evgeni Malkin↑	20	1,269	Played entire career with the team (2006–present)	
Kris Letang↑	20	1,235	Played entire career with the team (2006–present)	

=== San Jose Sharks ===
San Jose Sharks players with 1,000 or more NHL games played
Player	Seasons played with team	Games played	Notes	Ref(s)
Patrick Marleau	21	1,607	Played with the team on three separate occasions (1997–2017, 2019–2020, 2021)	
Marc-Edouard Vlasic	19	1,323	(2006–2025)	
Joe Thornton†	15	1,104	(2005–2020)	

The Sharks' active leader in games played is Barclay Goodrow, who has played 427 games with the team.

=== Seattle Kraken ===
Added to the NHL for the 2021–22 season, the Kraken have not yet existed for 1,000 games. The Kraken's active and all-time leader in games played is Adam Larsson, who has played 409 games with the team.

=== St. Louis Blues ===
No player has played 1,000 games with the franchise. The Blues' current leader in games played is Bernie Federko, who played 927 games with the team. The Blues' active leader in games played is Colton Parayko, who has played 800 games with the team.

=== Tampa Bay Lightning ===
Tampa Bay Lightning players with 1,000 or more NHL games played
Player	Seasons played with team	Games played	Notes	Ref(s)
Victor Hedman↑	17	1,164	Played entire career with the team (2009–present)	
Steven Stamkos	15	1,082	(2008–2024)	
Vincent Lecavalier	14	1,037	(1998–2013)	

=== Toronto Maple Leafs ===
Toronto Maple Leafs players with 1,000 or more NHL games played
Player	Seasons played with team	Games played	Notes	Ref(s)
George Armstrong†	21	1,188	Played entire career with the team (1949–50, 1951–1971)	
Tim Horton†	20	1,184	(1949–1970)	
Borje Salming†	16	1,099	(1973–1989)	
Dave Keon†	15	1,062	(1960–1975)	
Ron Ellis	16	1,034	Played entire career with the team (1963–1975,1977–1981)	

The Maple Leafs' active leader in games played is Morgan Rielly, who has played 951 games with the team.

=== Utah Mammoth ===
Added to the NHL for the 2024–25 season, the Utah Mammoth have not yet existed for 1,000 games. The Mammoth's all-time leaders in games played are Ian Cole and Nick Schmaltz, who have both played 164 games with the team; Schmaltz is also the active leader.

=== Vancouver Canucks ===
Vancouver Canucks players with 1,000 or more NHL games played
Player	Seasons played with team	Games played	Notes	Ref(s)
Henrik Sedin†	17	1,330	Played entire career with the team (2000–2018)	
Daniel Sedin†	17	1,306	Played entire career with the team (2000–2018)	
Trevor Linden	16	1,140	Played with the team on two separate occasions (1988–1998, 2001–2008)	

The Canucks' active leader in games played is Brock Boeser, who has played 629 games with the team.

=== Vegas Golden Knights ===
Added to the NHL for the 2017–18 season, the Golden Knights have not yet existed for 1,000 games. The Golden Knights' all-time and active leader in games played is Brayden McNabb, who has played 647 games with the team.

=== Washington Capitals ===
Washington Capitals players with 1,000 or more NHL games played
Player	Seasons played with team	Games played	Notes	Ref(s)
Alexander Ovechkin↑	21	1,573	Played entire career with the team (2005–present); Most games played of any single-franchise career	
John Carlson	17	1,143	(2009–2026)	
Nicklas Backstrom#	16	1,105	Played entire NHL career with the team (2007–2023)	

=== Winnipeg Jets ===
No player has played 1,000 games with the franchise. The Jets' all-time and active leader in games played is Mark Scheifele, who has played 961 games with the team. The franchise was inactive from 1996 to 1999 and was reactivated as the Atlanta Thrashers from 1999 to 2011.

== See also ==
- List of NHL players with the most games played by franchise
- List of NHL players who spent their entire career with one franchise
