= Alexander Edler =

Swedish ice hockey player (born 1986)

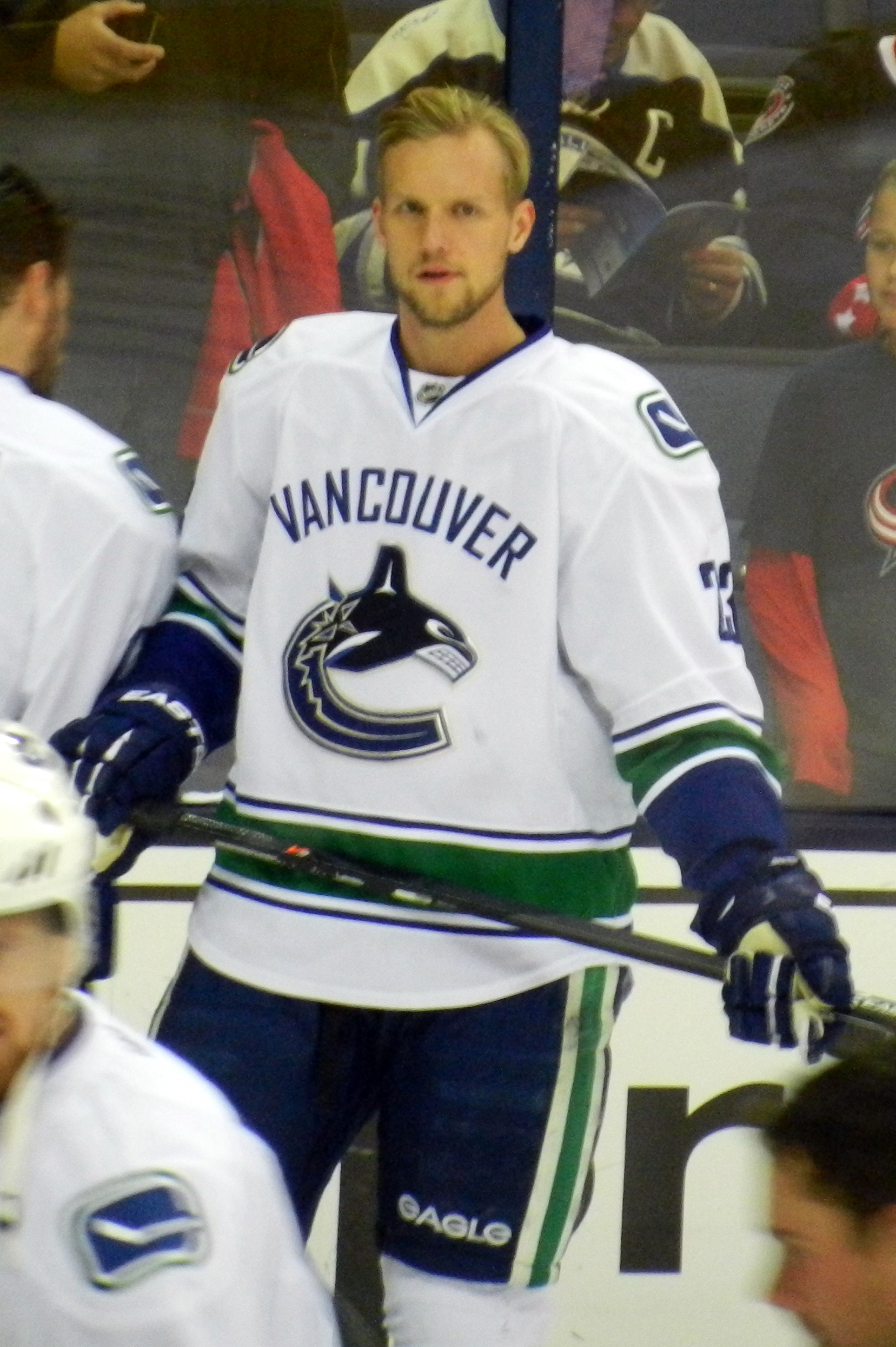
- Edler with the Vancouver Canucks in 2013
- Born: 21 April 1986 (age 40) Östersund, Sweden
- Height: 6 ft 3 in (191 cm)
- Weight: 205 lb (93 kg; 14 st 9 lb)
- Position: Defence
- Shot: Left
- Played for: Vancouver Canucks; Los Angeles Kings
- National team: Sweden
- NHL draft: 91st overall, 2004; Vancouver Canucks
- Playing career: 2003–2023

Ulf Niklas Alexander Edler (born 21 April 1986) is a Swedish former professional ice hockey player who was a defenceman for 17 seasons in the National Hockey League (NHL) for the Vancouver Canucks and the Los Angeles Kings. He was drafted out of Sweden's third-tier ice hockey league by the Canucks in the third round, 91st overall, in the 2004 NHL entry draft, and played junior ice hockey with Modo Hockey of the J20 SuperElit and the Kelowna Rockets of the Western Hockey League (WHL).

Edler turned professional in North America with the Canucks' American Hockey League (AHL) affiliate, the Manitoba Moose, in 2006–07, seeing some time in the NHL over the course of the season. He became a full-time member of the Canucks the following season, and has since been named to one NHL All-Star Game (2012). Having played in games for the Canucks in 2006–07, he was the longest tenured player on the team's lineup following the retirement of Daniel and Henrik Sedin, until the Kings acquired him in 2021.

Internationally, Edler has competed for Sweden on four occasions: at the 2006 World Junior Championships, the 2008 and 2013 IIHF World Championships (winning gold) and the 2014 Winter Olympics (winning silver). Edler was an offensive defenceman noted for his calm on-ice demeanor and strong slapshot.

Edler is regarded as one of the best Canucks defencemen of all time, holding the franchise records for most goals scored by a defenceman.

== Playing career ==
=== Sweden and junior (2001–2006) ===
Edler played at the under-17 level with his hometown district team of Jämtland in 2001 and 2002, competing at TV-pucken, a national Swedish tournament. In 2003–04, he joined the professional Jämtlands HF. He played with the club in Sweden's third-tier league, recording three goals and nine points in 24 games, while also appearing in six games for Jämtlands HF's junior team.

Edler was largely unknown during his NHL entry draft year, unranked by the NHL Central Scouting Bureau the entire season. He was brought to the attention of the Vancouver Canucks by the team's head scout in Sweden, Thomas Gradin, who saw Edler playing with Jämtlands HF. Although Gradin would refer to the team's level of play as little more than "beer-league-calibre", he was impressed with Edler and encouraged Canucks management to draft him. The Canucks traded up in the 2004 NHL entry draft to acquire the Dallas Stars' third-round draft pick in exchange for their own third-round pick in the 2005 NHL entry draft, and used the pick to select Edler 91st overall. The deal was made with the Stars in lieu of speculation that the Detroit Red Wings had a high interest in Edler and wanted to draft him in the third round as well. Detroit had discovered Edler in Sweden through their European scout Håkan Andersson, who was responsible for such previous Red Wings late-round picks as Henrik Zetterberg and Pavel Datsyuk. At the time of his draft, Canucks general manager Dave Nonis described Edler as a "smooth skater and a big guy". Nonis added, "He needs some time [to develop], but in terms of raw skill, he's got quite a bit of it."

After being selected by the Canucks, Gradin brokered a move for Edler to play with Modo Hockey's junior club of the J20 SuperElit. Edler had previously tried-out for Modo's youth program, but was cut. Future Canucks teammates Markus Näslund, Henrik Sedin, and Daniel Sedin had also played in the Modo system before joining the NHL. In Edler's lone season with Modo, he recorded 8 goals and 23 points over 33 games in 2004–05. He ranked second in point-scoring among league defencemen to Modo teammate Tommy Enström, who recorded 33.

On 29 June 2005, Edler's major junior rights were obtained by the Kelowna Rockets of the Western Hockey League (WHL); he was chosen by Kelowna in the first round, 58th overall, of the Canadian Hockey League Import Draft. The Canucks encouraged Edler to move from Sweden to play junior in North America. After reporting to training camp with the Canucks' American Hockey League (AHL) affiliate, the Manitoba Moose, in September 2005, he was assigned to junior with the Rockets. In his lone WHL season, Edler recorded 13 goals and 53 points over 62 games in 2005–06, ranking fifth among WHL defencemen and fourth among all rookies in scoring. He went on to help Kelowna to the second round of the WHL playoffs, where they were eliminated by the Everett Silvertips. In 12 postseason games, Edler added eight points.

=== Vancouver Canucks (2006–2021) ===
The following off-season, Edler was signed to an entry-level contract by the Canucks on 24 July 2006. Reporting to the Canucks' training camp in September 2006, his play had the Canucks slotting him in as the team's seventh defenceman. However, a hip injury saw him assigned to the Manitoba Moose. Following an injury to Canucks defenceman Sami Salo, he was called up to the NHL on 3 November 2006, two games into his AHL season. He made his NHL debut the following day against the Colorado Avalanche. Eleven days later, he was reassigned to the Moose, only to be recalled on 24 November. He scored his first NHL goal on 30 November, a slap shot that beat Anaheim Ducks goaltender Jean-Sébastien Giguère in a 2–1 loss. Edler was reassigned between Manitoba and Vancouver on several more occasions over the course of the 2006–07 season. He appeared in 22 games total for the Canucks, recording a goal and two assists. With the Moose, he scored five goals and 21 assists for 26 points over 49 games and was named Manitoba's Rookie of the Year.

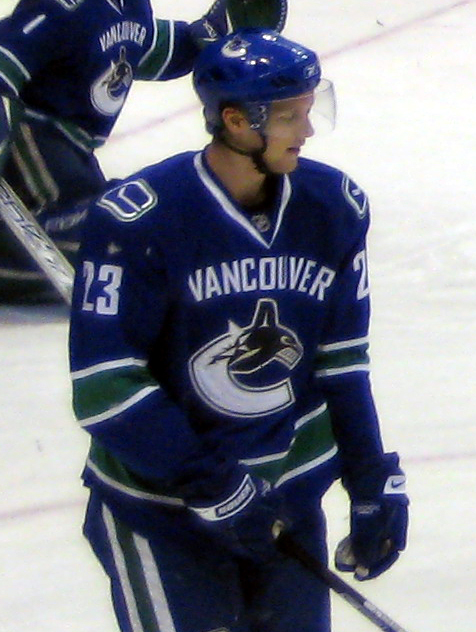
Edler with the Canucks in January 2008

Playing in his rookie season with the Canucks the following season, (Note: He still qualified as a rookie during the 2007–08 season because he did not play at least 25 NHL games the previous season.) Edler was chosen to compete in the 2008 NHL YoungStars Game. Representing the Western Conference, his team was defeated 7–6 by the Eastern Conference. Playing amidst numerous injuries on the Canucks' blueline, Edler appeared in the most games among team defencemen with 75. With all the injuries to his teammates, he was given additional time on the power play and penalty kill. His eight goals ranked second among rookie defencemen in the NHL, while his 20 points was fifth overall.

On 9 October 2008, at the start of the 2008–09 season, Edler signed a new four-year, $13 million contract with Vancouver. The contract, a raise from his 2008–09 salary of $550,000, took effect for the 2009–10 season. The following month, he missed two games sidelined with the flu. Later in the season, he recorded a personal best four-point game (one goal and three assists) in a game against the Chicago Blackhawks on 7 February 2009. He finished with 37 points, including a career-high ten goals. In the 2009 Stanley Cup playoffs, Edler led all Canucks defencemen with seven points in ten games as the Canucks were eliminated in the second round by Chicago. In his first few seasons in the NHL, Edler was often paired with veteran blueliner and countryman Mattias Öhlund, who he considered a mentor for him.

The following campaign, 2009–10, Edler improved to career-highs of 37 assists, first among team defencemen, and 42 points, second to Christian Ehrhoff. He missed six games near the midpoint of the campaign due to a left arm injury, sustained in December 2009. In the 2010 playoffs, he added six points in 12 games as the Canucks were eliminated in the second round, again by the Blackhawks. Edler was injured in the sixth and deciding game of the series after opposing forward Dustin Byfuglien stepped on his right ankle after hitting him along the boards. Requiring a walking cast for five weeks, he rehabilitated his ankle during the off-season.

Recovering in time for the 2010–11 season, Edler continued to improve and was on pace to record new career-highs in goals, assists and points until he suffered a back injury on 24 January 2011 in a 7–1 win against the Dallas Stars after an open-ice hit against Dallas Stars forward Jamie Benn. Canucks general manager Mike Gillis told reporters that Edler had been experiencing tightness in his back at several times earlier in the season, but the hit from Benn was the breaking point. Edler underwent microdiscectomy surgery to relieve pressure on a herniated disk and was sidelined for 2 1/2 months, returning for the second-last game of the regular season. Finishing the season with eight goals and 33 points over 51 games, he ranked second among team defencemen in scoring, behind Ehrhoff. His 24 minutes and 17 seconds of average ice time per game also led the Canucks. As the Canucks won the Presidents' Trophy for the first time in franchise history, the team entered the 2011 playoffs with the first seed in the West. Eliminating the Chicago Blackhawks, Nashville Predators and San Jose Sharks, the Canucks advanced to the Stanley Cup Finals for the first time in 17 years. Facing the Boston Bruins, the team lost the series in seven games. Following their defeat, it was revealed that several Canucks players had been playing with injuries, including Edler, who played Game 7 with two broken fingers that was initially suffered in game six two days prior. In the playoffs, he ranked second among Canucks defencemen and third in the league overall with 11 points (two goals and nine assists) in all 25 games.

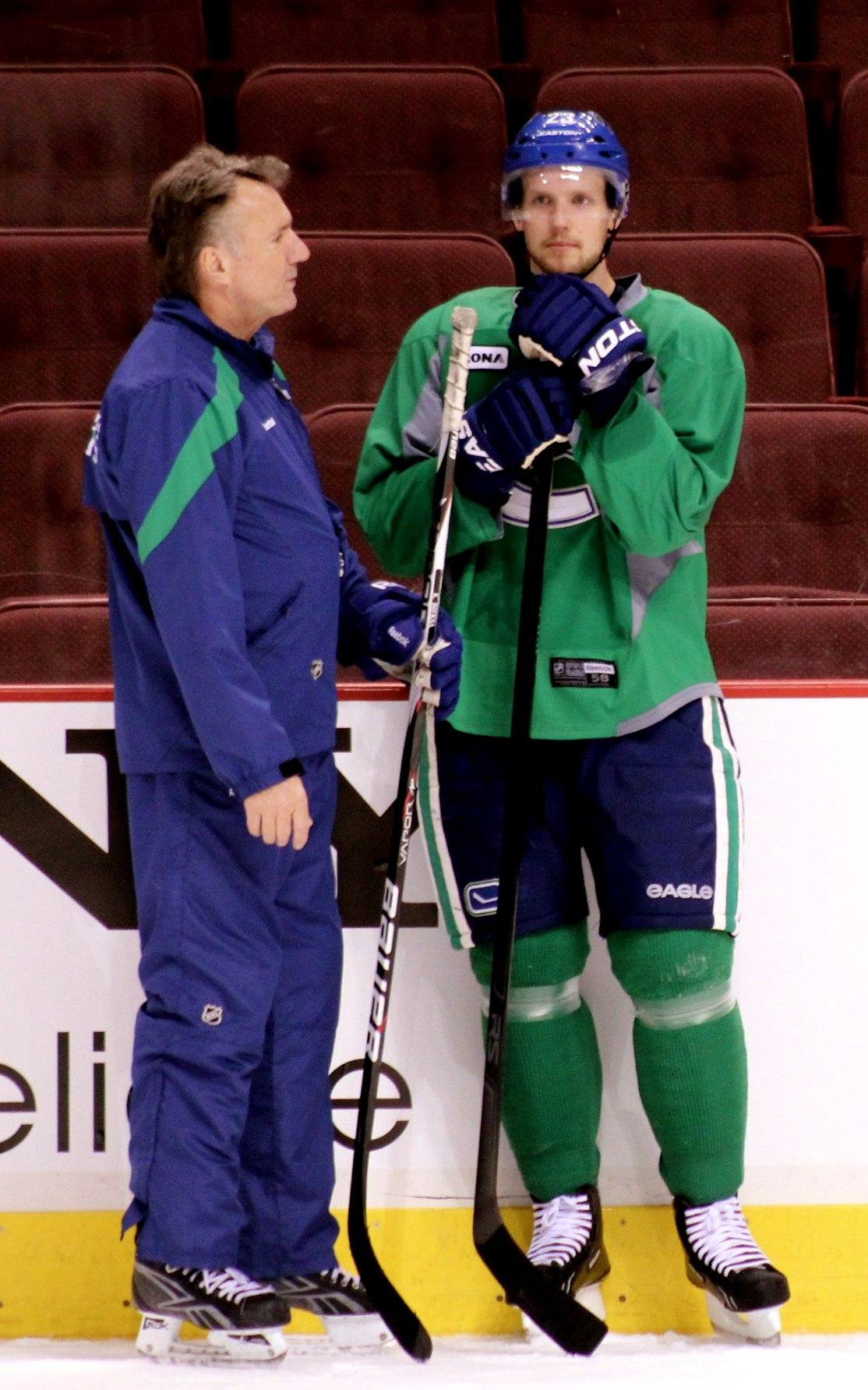
Edler (right) talking with Canucks assistant coach Rick Bowness during a Canucks practice in March 2012

With the departure of Christian Ehrhoff, the Canucks' leading defensive scorer from the previous two seasons, to the Buffalo Sabres in the off-season, Edler assumed a larger role on the team's blueline in the 2011–12 season. By mid-January 2012, Edler was ranked fourth among NHL defenceman in scoring with 7 goals and 24 points. That month, he was selected to his first NHL All-Star Game. He was selected to the competition alongside Canucks teammates Daniel and Henrik Sedin, as well as Cody Hodgson, who was named to the rookie squad. Playing for Team Alfredsson, Edler logged 21 minutes of ice time in a 12–9 loss to Team Chara. Edler finished the campaign having played all 82 games for the first time in his career. He recorded personal bests and team-highs among defencemen in all major statistical categories with 11 goals, 38 assists and 49 points. League-wide, he ranked seventh among defencemen in point-scoring. Out of eight attempts, his four shootout goals was first among NHL defencemen. His efforts helped the Canucks to a second consecutive Presidents' Trophy. Individually, he earned four fifth-place votes for the James Norris Memorial Trophy to rank 15th overall. Defending their Clarence S. Campbell Bowl as Western Conference champions from the previous year, the Canucks lost in the first round of the 2012 playoffs to the eighth-seeded and eventual Stanley Cup champion Los Angeles Kings. Edler recorded two goals in the five-game series.

On 18 January 2013, Edler signed a new six-year, $30 million contract to remain with the Canucks, which took effect for the 2013–14 season and concluding after the 2018–19 season. During the summer, Edler was the talk of trade rumours at the trade deadline. The Detroit Red Wings were the team most interested in Edler, and general manager Mike Gills tried to move Edler before the no-trade clause in his contract took effect on 1 July 2013. Ultimately, no deal was reached.

On 2 March 2018, Edler recorded two assists and surpassed Mattias Öhlund's franchise record of points by a Canucks defenceman.

On 22 December 2018, Edler overtook Ohlund's record for most games played by a Canucks defenceman. With the 2019 NHL trade deadline approaching, the Canucks entertained trading Edler, but ultimately didn't, as the defenceman refused to waive his no-trade clause. On 28 March, Edler scored his 94th career goal with the Canucks, surpassing Ohlund's record of most goals by a Canucks defenceman. Despite the injuries, which kept Edler to just 56 games, his 10 goals were his first double-digit total since 2011–12, and his 34 points in this abbreviated season represented his best per game pace since the same 2011–12 season.

On 20 June 2019, Edler signed a new two-year, $12 million contract with Vancouver for the 2019–20 and 2020–21 seasons worth $6 million annually. On 16 January 2020, Edler overtook the record for most assists by a Canucks defenceman, previously held by Dennis Kearns.

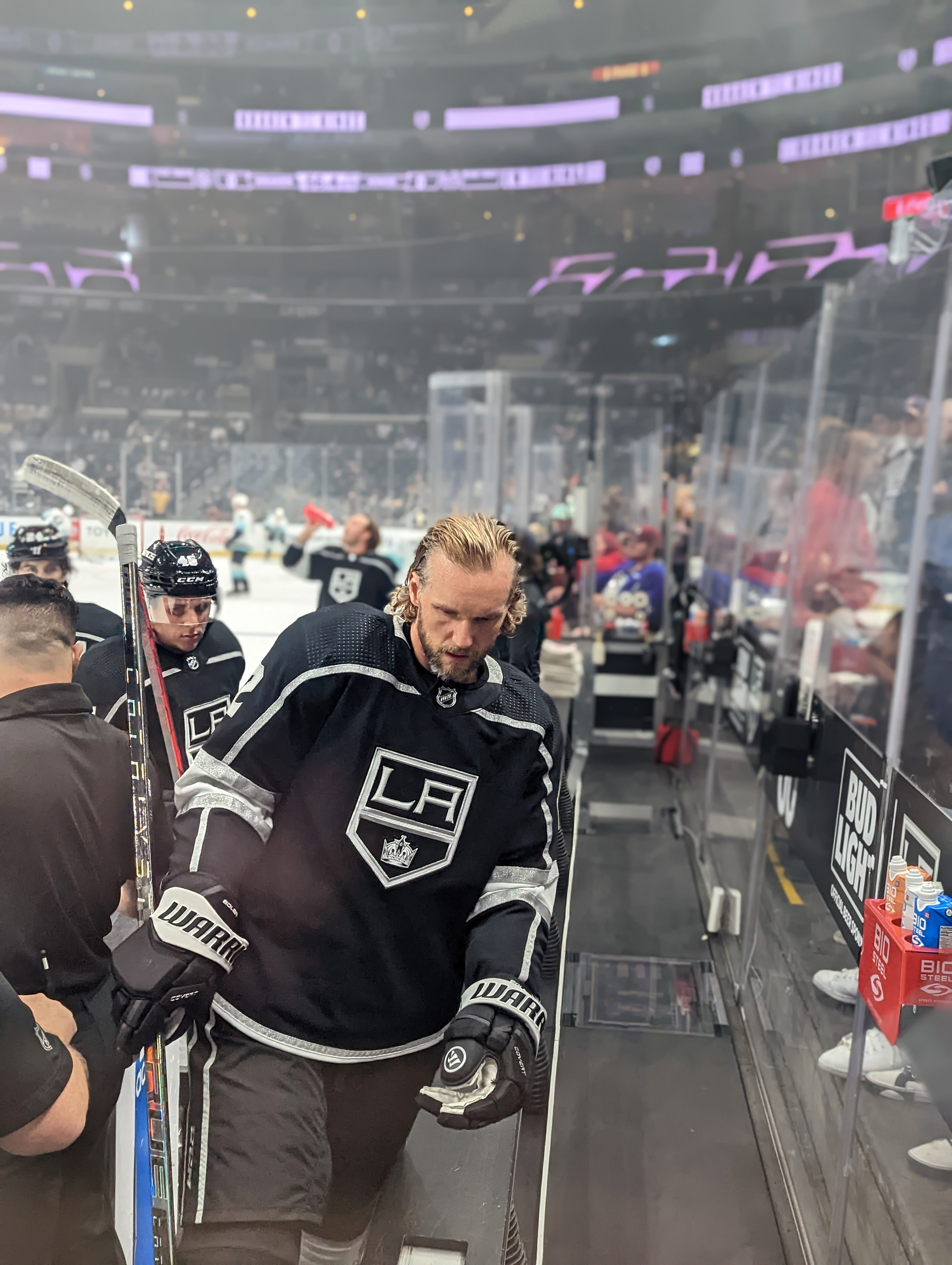
Edler with the Los Angeles Kings in October 2022

With fellow long-time Canuck Christopher Tanev's departure on 9 October 2020, Edler would become the last remaining player from the 2010–11 Vancouver Canucks that played in the Stanley Cup Finals.

=== Los Angeles Kings (2021–2023) ===
On 28 July 2021, Edler left the Canucks, having spent the entirety of his 15-year career with Vancouver, to sign as a free agent on a one-year, $3.5 million contract with the Los Angeles Kings.

Edler recorded his first point for Los Angeles on 23 October 2021, an assist in a 7–3 loss to the St. Louis Blues. On 2 December 2021, Edler scored his 100th career NHL goal in a 3–2 loss against the Calgary Flames. It was also his first goal as a member of the Kings. On 11 December 2021, Edler injured his leg and was placed on the injured reserve list. He missed 36 games as a result. He would be activated off the injured reserve list on 22 March 2022.

On 12 July 2022, Edler signed a one-year, $750k contract extension with the Kings. He played his 1,000th NHL game on 31 December 2022 in a game against the Philadelphia Flyers.

=== Retirement ===
On 17 September 2024, the Canucks announced that Edler would sign a one-day contract to officially retire as a member of the franchise, with the ceremony taking place on 11 October during their second regular season game against the Philadelphia Flyers.

== International play ==
Medal record

Representing Sweden

Ice hockey

Winter Olympics
Silver medal – second place	2014 Sochi	

World Championships
Gold medal – first place	2017 Germany/France	
Gold medal – first place	2013 Sweden/Finland	

Edler made his first appearance for Sweden at the under-20 level, competing in the 2006 World Junior Championships in British Columbia. He notched his lone point of the tournament, an assist, in a 10–2 round-robin win against Latvia. Sweden went on to finish in fifth place, having lost their quarterfinal game to Finland. Two years later, Edler debuted with Sweden's men's team at the 2008 IIHF World Championships in Halifax and Quebec City. He scored his first international goal on the powerplay against French goaltender Fabrice Lhenry in a 9–0 round-robin win. Sweden went on to the bronze medal game, where they were defeated by Canada 5–4. Edler finished with a goal and two assists in eight games. His 19:02 minutes of average ice time per game ranked third among team defencemen.

Edler was responsible for a knee-on-knee hit to Carolina Hurricanes captain Eric Staal in the quarterfinals of the 2013 IIHF World Championship, and was suspended for the final two games of the championship. Sweden went on to win the gold medal, and Edler was awarded a medal even though he did not play in the gold medal game. On 29 July 2013, the IIHF extended the suspension to cover Sweden's first two games of the 2014 Winter Olympics in Sochi. Edler later joined team Sweden during the Olympics after his two-game suspension. He recorded a goal and two assists in the tournament, helping Sweden earn the silver medal.

== Playing style ==
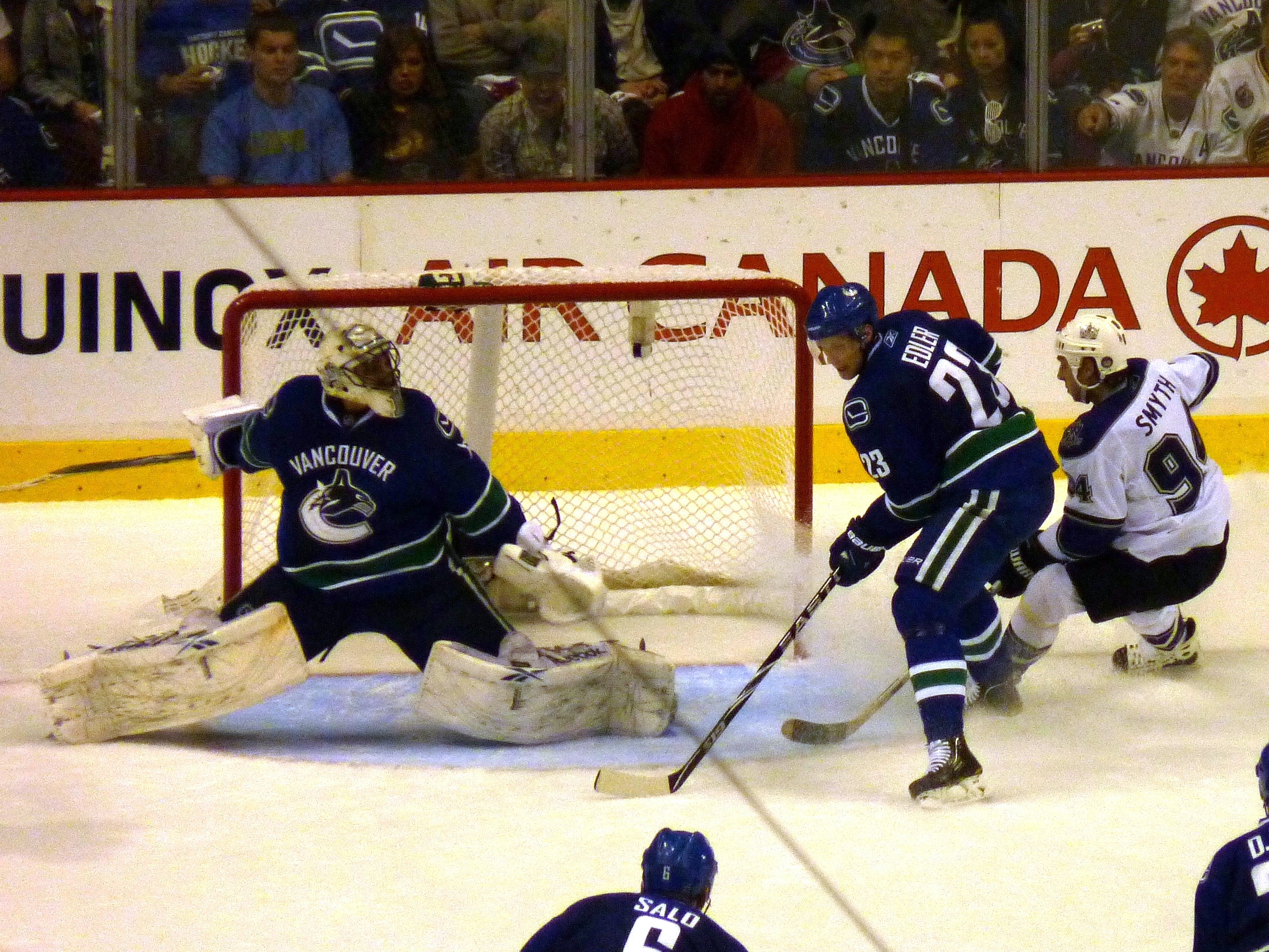
Edler (centre) keeps Ryan Smyth (right) away from Roberto Luongo (left) and the Canucks' net in April 2010.

Edler plays in the style of an offensive defenceman. One of his strongest offensive assets is his slapshot. At the Canucks' 2008 SuperSkills event, he beat the team's reigning hardest shooter, Sami Salo, with a 99.3 mile-per-hour shot and has gone on to win the competition in 2009 and 2010, as well. He is also known for his poise and confidence with the puck, allowing him to make strong first passes out of the defensive zone to forwards. Many within the Canucks organization, such as assistant coach Rick Bowness, have asserted this as a reflection of his calm off-ice demeanor.

Despite Edler's imposing physical characteristics, he was not known to be an aggressive defender early in his NHL career. However, he has gradually shown a capability for physicality and to hit opposing players hard. Looking back on his transition to North American hockey with the Kelowna Rockets, Edler noted the most difficult adjustment was the physical aspect of the game, which was more pronounced than in Sweden. During the Canucks' 2011 playoff run, teammate Kevin Bieksa compared him to Edler's former defensive partner, Mattias Öhlund, commenting, "He [Edler] was like Bambi when he first came into the league but now he realized how big and strong he is. When he hits guys, he hurts them."

== Personal life ==
Edler was born in Östersund, Sweden. He has a brother, Jens, and a sister, Katarina. He began playing hockey at the age of six. Edler has a permanent home in Vancouver, where he met his wife Aman and where his daughters Emme and River were born.

== Career statistics ==
=== Regular season and playoffs ===
			Regular season					Playoffs
Season	Team	League	GP	G	A	Pts	PIM	GP	G	A	Pts	PIM
2001–02	Jämtland	TVp	8	0	1	1	2	—	—	—	—	—
2002–03	Jämtland	TVp	8	2	1	3	0	—	—	—	—	—
2003–04	Jämtlands HF	SWE.2 U20	6	0	3	3	6	—	—	—	—	—
2003–04	Jämtlands HF	SWE.3	24	3	6	9	20	—	—	—	—	—
2004–05	Modo Hockey	J20	33	8	15	23	40	5	1	0	1	6
2005–06	Kelowna Rockets	WHL	62	13	40	53	44	12	3	5	8	12
2006–07	Manitoba Moose	AHL	47	5	21	26	16	—	—	—	—	—
2006–07	Vancouver Canucks	NHL	22	1	2	3	6	3	0	0	0	2
2007–08	Vancouver Canucks	NHL	75	8	12	20	42	—	—	—	—	—
2008–09	Vancouver Canucks	NHL	80	10	27	37	54	10	1	7	8	6
2009–10	Vancouver Canucks	NHL	76	5	37	42	40	12	2	4	6	10
2010–11	Vancouver Canucks	NHL	51	8	25	33	24	25	2	9	11	8
2011–12	Vancouver Canucks	NHL	82	11	38	49	34	5	2	0	2	8
2012–13	Vancouver Canucks	NHL	45	8	14	22	37	4	1	0	1	2
2013–14	Vancouver Canucks	NHL	63	7	15	22	50	—	—	—	—	—
2014–15	Vancouver Canucks	NHL	74	8	23	31	54	6	0	3	3	4
2015–16	Vancouver Canucks	NHL	52	6	14	20	46	—	—	—	—	—
2016–17	Vancouver Canucks	NHL	68	6	15	21	36	—	—	—	—	—
2017–18	Vancouver Canucks	NHL	70	6	28	34	68	—	—	—	—	—
2018–19	Vancouver Canucks	NHL	56	10	24	34	54	—	—	—	—	—
2019–20	Vancouver Canucks	NHL	59	5	28	33	62	17	0	7	7	20
2020–21	Vancouver Canucks	NHL	52	0	8	8	58	—	—	—	—	—
2021–22	Los Angeles Kings	NHL	41	3	16	19	34	7	0	2	2	14
2022–23	Los Angeles Kings	NHL	64	2	9	11	34	4	0	0	0	4
NHL totals			1,030	104	335	439	733	93	8	32	40	78

=== International ===
Year	Team	Event	Result	GP	G	A	Pts	PIM
2006	Sweden	WJC	5th	6	0	1	1	6
2008	Sweden	WC	4th	8	1	2	3	12
2013	Sweden	WC	1st place, gold medalist(s)	2	0	1	1	25
2014	Sweden	OG	2nd place, silver medalist(s)	4	1	1	2	0
2017	Sweden	WC	1st place, gold medalist(s)	10	2	2	4	4
Junior totals				6	0	1	1	6
Senior totals				24	4	6	10	41

== Awards and honors ==
Award	Year
NHL
YoungStars Game	2008
NHL All-Star Game	2012
Vancouver Canucks
Babe Pratt Trophy	2012, 2018, 2019
Daniel & Henrik Sedin Award	2020
