= Daniel & Henrik Sedin Award =

Ice hockey award

The Daniel and Henrik Sedin Award is an annual award of the Vancouver Canucks of the National Hockey League (NHL) that is presented to the player who best exemplifies community leadership. The most recent recipient is Brock Boeser, who has won it in the 2025–26 season.

== List of winners ==
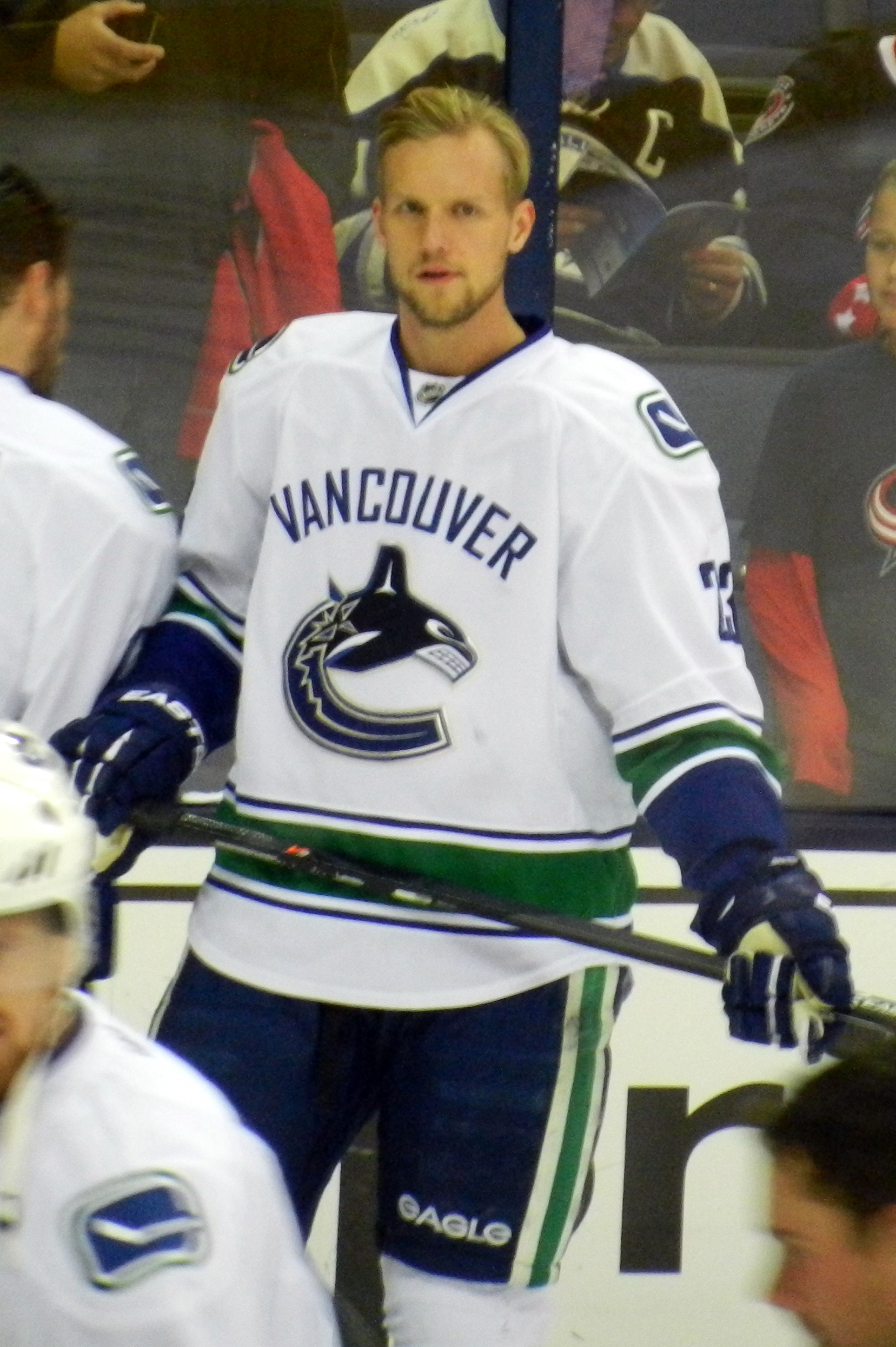
Alex Edler was the inaugural winner of the award

Positions key
C	Centre	LW	Left wing	D	Defence	RW	Right wing	G	Goaltender

player is still active with the Canucks.

Season	Winner	Position	Ref
2019–20	Alex Edler	D	
2020–21	Tyler Motte	LW	
2021–22	Brandon Sutter	C	
2022–23	Brock Boeser	RW	
2023–24	Quinn Hughes	D	
2024–25	Quinn Hughes	D	
2025–26	Brock Boeser	RW	

== See also ==
- Babe Pratt Trophy
- Cyrus H. McLean Trophy
- Fred J. Hume Award
- Pavel Bure Most Exciting Player Award
