= Defenceman =

Position in ice hockey

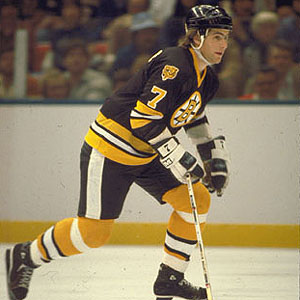
Ray Bourque, the highest-scoring defenceman in NHL history

Defenceman or defense (in American English) in ice hockey is a player position that is primarily responsible for preventing the opposing team from scoring. They are often referred to as defencemen, D, D-men, defenders or blueliners (the last a reference to the blue line in ice hockey which represents the boundary of the offensive zone; defencemen generally position themselves along the line to keep the puck in the zone). They were once called cover-point.

In regular play, two defencemen complement three forwards and a goaltender on the ice. Exceptions include overtime during the regular season and when a team is short-handed (i.e. has been assessed a penalty), in which two defencemen are typically joined by only two forwards and a goaltender; when a team is on the power play (i.e. the opponent has been assessed a penalty), teams will often play only one defenceman, joined by four forwards and a goaltender. In the National Hockey League's regular season play in overtime, effective with the 2015–16 season, teams usually have only three position players and a goaltender on the ice, and may use either two forwards and one defenceman, or in rare cases – two defencemen and one forward.

== Historical designations ==
Organized play of ice hockey originates from the first indoor game in Montreal in 1875. In subsequent years, the number of players per side was reduced to seven. Positions were standardized, and two correspond to the two defencemen of current six-man rules. These were designated as cover point and point, although they lined up behind the centre and the rover, unlike today. Decades later, defencemen were standardized into playing left and right sides of the ice.

=== Point ===
According to one of the earliest known books on ice hockey, Farrell's Hockey: Canada's Royal Winter Game (1899), Mike Grant of the Montreal Victorias, describes the point as "essentially defensive. He should not stray too far from his place, because oftentimes he is practically a second goal-minder ... although he should remain close to his goal-keeper, he should never obstruct that man's view of the puck. He should, as a rule, avoid rushing up the ice, but if he has a good opening for such a play he should give the puck to one of the forwards on the first opportunity and then hasten back to his position, which has been occupied, in the interim, by the cover-point."

=== Cover-point ===
Also in Farrell's 1899 book, Hugh Baird, then captain and cover-point of the Montreal Hockey Club, describes the cover-point as "a combination of a defence man and a forward, and is allowed, in virtue of this fact, more latitude with respect to leaving his position, than any man on the team, except the rover. In his capacity of a defence player, he should linger around his goals as long as the puck is near... When the play is at the other end of the rink, the cover-point should advance to about the middle, so that when the puck is lifted down, he may return it without loss of time, in order to keep the game centred around his opponents' goals, and to save his forwards the trouble of skating up to him so that they may again 'get in to play.' It is by playing far up under these circumstances that a clever cover-point can chine to the advantage of his team. If he has a good opening he should shoot well for the goals, but if he has not, he should, as I have said, return the puck instantaneously."

== Distinguished defencemen ==
After a finished season the NHL, the premier ice hockey league in the world, presents the James Norris Memorial Trophy to the best defenceman in the league. Bobby Orr of the Boston Bruins – an eight-time Norris Trophy recipient – is often considered to be the greatest defenceman in NHL and ice hockey history. In addition to his Norris Trophy honours, he is the only defenceman in NHL history to capture the Art Ross Trophy as the league's leading scorer. In 1998, Orr was selected as the best defenceman of all time (second overall player behind Wayne Gretzky) in The Hockey News' Top 100 NHL Players of all time.

Conversely, according to the IIHF Centennial All-Star Team (also chosen by The Hockey News), the greatest defencemen to play in IIHF-sanctioned international competition are Vyacheslav Fetisov and Börje Salming.

== 'Stay-at-home' and 'offensive' defence ==
Defence players are often described by how much time they participate in offence. The extreme of non-participation in offence is a "stay-at-home" defender, who plays a conservative, risk-averse game and does not score much, instead focusing on defensive assignments towards the opposing team. A good example is Rod Langway, who won the 1983 Norris Trophy after having scored only three goals that season, as the award winners before and after him were primarily offensive defencemen such as Bobby Orr, Denis Potvin, and Paul Coffey. Other examples of stay-at-home defencemen include Leo Boivin, Chris Chelios, Tim Horton, Harry Howell, Tom Johnson, Jacques Laperrière, Kevin Lowe, Brad McCrimmon, Bill Quackenbush, and Scott Stevens.

The other extreme of participation is an offensive defenceman, who gets aggressively involved in the team's offence. To accomplish this, the offensive defence player often "pinches in" to keep the play from going offside and moves towards the halfboards and high-slot area for scoring opportunities. This makes it difficult for the opposing team to protect their net from being scored upon if the team can maintain control of the puck. However, this can lead to more odd-man rushes and breakaway opportunities for the opposing team if the defender does not succeed. Bobby Orr's end-to-end rushing allowed him to defend effectively as well as attack, helping his teams win two Stanley Cup Championships. By contrast, Paul Coffey enjoyed high offensive production but his defensive play was considered mediocre for most of his career; he helped his teams win four Stanley Cup Championships, often paired with a "stay-at-home" defender.

=== Defensive zone play ===
When in the defensive zone, the defence player is responsible for keeping the opposing forwards' opportunities to a minimum when they are on a rush, forcing them to the corners and blocking both passing and shooting lanes. The primary responsibility is to cover areas of the defensive zone that would otherwise pose a clear goalscoring threat from the opposing offence.

When the opposing offence is putting pressure on the defence's team, the defence skater usually plays closer to the net, attempting again to block shooting lanes but also ensure that the goalie is not screened (prevented from being able to see the puck at all times). It is especially critical for the defenceman to keep opposing forwards from being able to move effectively in front of the net, which is why defencemen are frequently tasked with playing physical hockey in front of their own net. If a shot on net is made, an unguarded forward can often redirect it too quickly for the goalie to adjust or else score on a rebound. Another important duty is clearing rebounds away from the goal, and preferably to the defenceman's teammates, before opposing forwards can get to them. Often, defence players end up covering the opposing team's wingers while in the defensive zone, while their centre will cover the opposing team's centre.

=== Neutral zone play ===
In the neutral zone, the defence hangs back towards their own blue line, usually playing the puck up to other teammates. According to Jay Leach, who writes for NHL.com's "learn to play hockey" section, the defence must "Move the puck hard and quick to the open man. Join the rush, [but] do not lead it." Because of this responsibility, defencemen must read the other team's defensive strategy effectively in order to make an effective first pass that furthers the offensive momentum without leaving the defenceman out of position should their team lose control of the puck. In certain situations the best option could be to skate the puck into the zone to maintain offensive speed as well as preventing an offside.

=== Offensive zone play ===
In the offensive zone, the defence skaters usually "play the blue line". It is their duty to keep the puck in the offensive zone by stopping it from crossing the blue line that demarcates where the offensive zone begins. Should the puck cross this line, the offence cannot touch the puck in their opponent's zone without stopping play (see offside). Defencemen must be quick to pass the puck around, helping their forwards to open up shooting lanes, or taking open shots themselves when they become available. The defence must also be able to skate quickly to cut off any breakaways, moving themselves back into the defensive zone ahead of the onrushing opponent.

Essentially in all three zones of the rink, the defence is the backstop for the puck. It should never go behind the defence, unless the player intentionally lets it for strategic reasons. The defence keeps the momentum of play squarely directed towards the opposing goal, or at least away from their own.

Because defencemen are often expected to shoot on the opposing net from long range, these players often develop the hardest and most accurate slapshots. This is because taking a more stationary position on the blue line rewards pure accuracy and patience, rather than the adept hand–eye coordination attributed to forwards. Al MacInnis, who was seven times decorated with "Hardest Shot" in NHL skills competitions, was able to score frequently from the blue line because his slapshot was simply too fast to block effectively.

When a team is on a power play, a defence player can set up plays in the offensive zone, and distribute the puck to the teammate that he or she feels is in the best position to score, similar to a point guard in basketball, a playmaker in soccer, and a quarterback in American football and Canadian football. For this reason, a defenceman will often be described as the power play "quarterback", in particular if an umbrella power play formation is used (where a single defenceman is occupying the point, in the middle of the ice). This is also referred to as "playing the point" (this term derives not from the basketball position, but from an older name for the defence position in hockey itself).

== Faceoffs ==
During faceoffs in the defensive zone, most teams have their defence players pair up with opposing wingers to tie them up while leaving their team's forwards open to move the puck, though this is at the discretion of the individual coach. In the offensive zone, the defence player acts in their usual role, keeping control of the puck as the forwards fight for position.

In the first organized ice hockey league (see Amateur Hockey Association of Canada), defencemen used to line up in an "I" formation behind the rover (defunct) as point and cover point. Defence is still referred to as "playing the point", though this term now refers mostly to the role of defencemen on the power-play.

== Skating ==
Defencemen must possess excellent skating abilities, specifically in speed, constant foot movement and quick transitioning from forward to backward and vice versa. With regard to skating backwards, defencemen must acquire a higher skill level than offensive players. This allows them to face their offensive opponents as they rush down the ice toward the defensive zone. A defenceman must be as comfortable going backwards and sideways as forwards. Defencemen must also gain confidence in quickly carrying the puck to open up the attack during a defensive zone break-out. This requires the ability to burst out of the defensive zone with speed, yet at the same time having the ability to use their vision to execute quick passes to open forwards, or gaining the neutral zone before shooting the puck into the offensive zone.
