= Playing the ball in bandy =

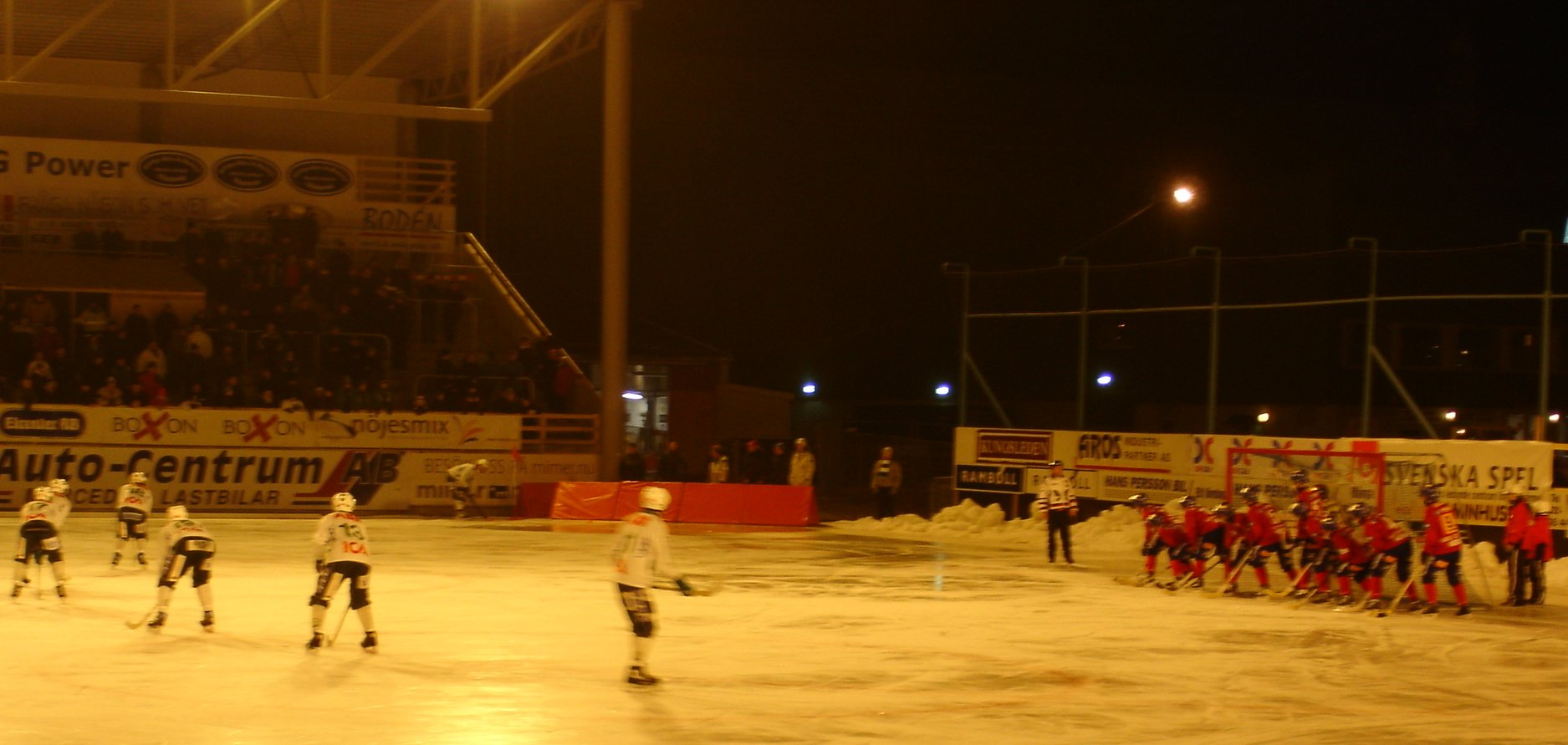
A corner is about to be taken during the Västerås SK-Edsbyn Elitserien game in Sweden in January 2007.

Playing the ball and putting the ball in play are the names of two of the rules of bandy, rule 7 and rule 10 of the Bandy Playing Rules. They are similar and thus are both dealt with in this text.

According to rule 7.1, a bandy player is allowed to hit, stop, give direction to or bring the ball with him as long as the point where his stick hits the ball is not higher than his shoulder when it is in an upright position. Even if the stick should be used, the player may direct the ball with his body or with his skates, according to rule 7.2, but not with his hand, arm or head, and if he continues playing the ball, he should use his stick and nothing else. Breaking the rules may give the other team a free stroke or a penalty stroke, according to rule 7.3.

Under rule 10 of the bandy playing rules, the two basic states of play during a game are ball in play and ball out of play. From the beginning of each playing period with a stroke-off (a set strike from the centre-spot by one team) until the end of the playing period, the ball is in play at all times, except when either the ball leaves the field of play, or play is stopped by the referee. When the ball becomes out of play, play is restarted by one of six restart methods depending on how it went out of play:

Method	Description
Stroke-off	Following a goal by the opposing team, or to begin each period of play.
Goal-throw	When the ball has wholly crossed the goal line without a goal having been scored and having last been touched by a member of the attacking team; awarded to the defending team.
Corner stroke	When the ball has wholly crossed the goal line without a goal having been scored and having last been touched by a member of the defending team; awarded to attacking team. The defending team must locate themselves behind goal line and the attacking team must be situated outside the penalty area with everyone but the executor no closer to the shortline than 5 m. As soon as the corner is shot, the attackers may enter the penalty area and the defenders may rush to try to stop the ball.
Free-stroke	Awarded to fouled team following certain listed offences, or to the opposing team upon a team causing the ball to leave the field over the side-line.
Penalty shot	Awarded to the fouled team following a foul usually punishable by a free-shot but that has occurred within their opponent's penalty area.
Face-off	Occurs when the referee has stopped play for any other reason (for example, a serious injury to a player, interference by an external party, or a ball becoming defective). This restart is uncommon in adult games.

If the time runs out while a team is preparing for a free-stroke or penalty, the strike should still be made but it must go into the goal by one shot to count as a goal. Similarly, a goal made via a corner stroke should be allowed, but it must be executed using only one shot in addition to the strike needed to put the ball in play.
