= Face-off =

Method used to begin play in ice hockey and some other sports

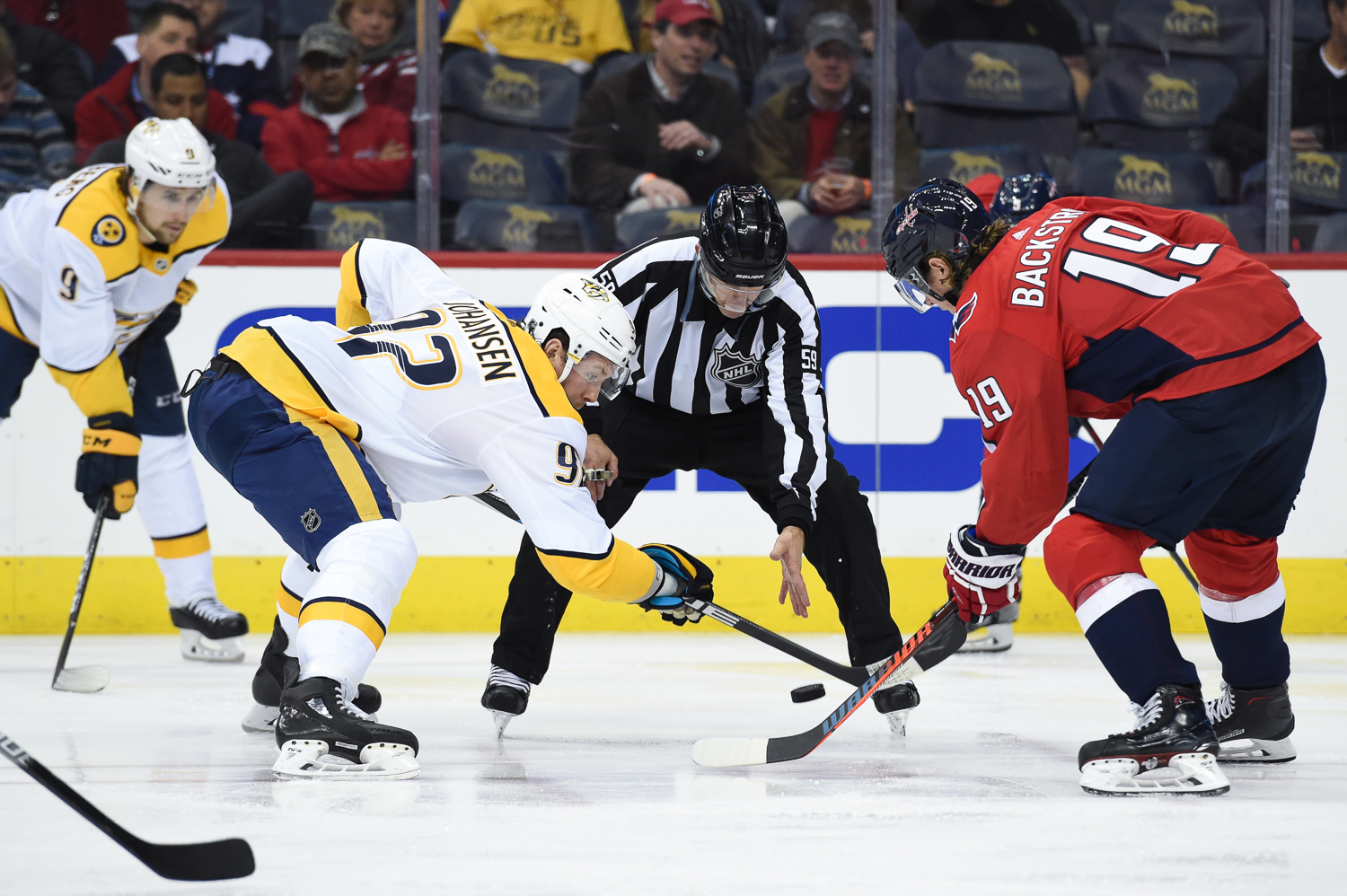
A referee (center) drops the puck between Ryan Johansen (left) and Nicklas Bäckström for a face-off during a National Hockey League game between the Nashville Predators and Washington Capitals in October 2018

A face-off is the method used to begin and restart play after goals in some sports using sticks, primarily ice hockey, inline hockey, bandy, floorball, broomball, rinkball, and lacrosse.

During a face-off, two teams line up in opposition to each other, and the opposing players attempt to gain control of the puck or ball after it is dropped or otherwise placed between their sticks by an official.

== Hockey ==
=== Ice hockey ===
Face-offs

Video of a face-off in a Swiss hockey game

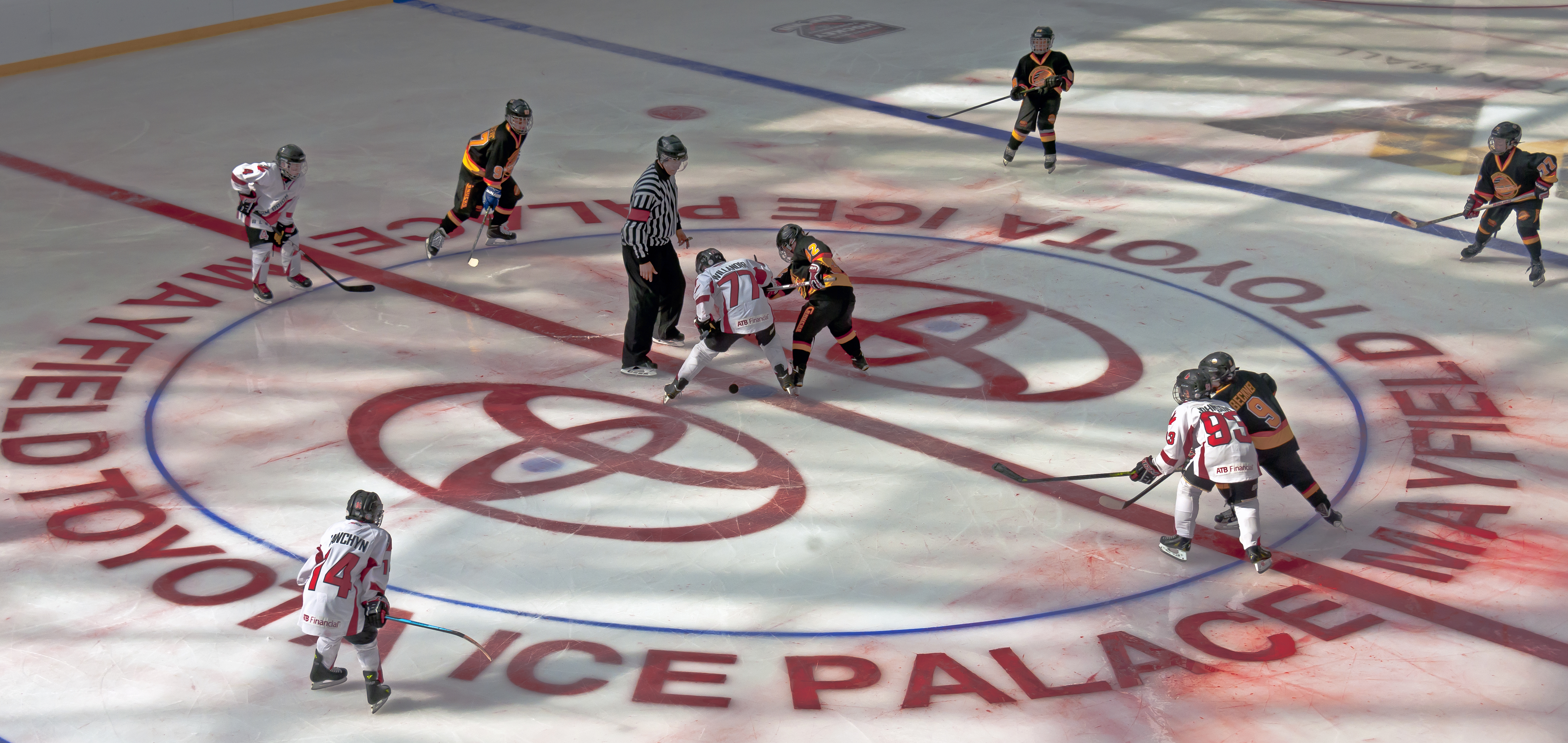
A face-off at centre ice in a youth hockey game in June 2015

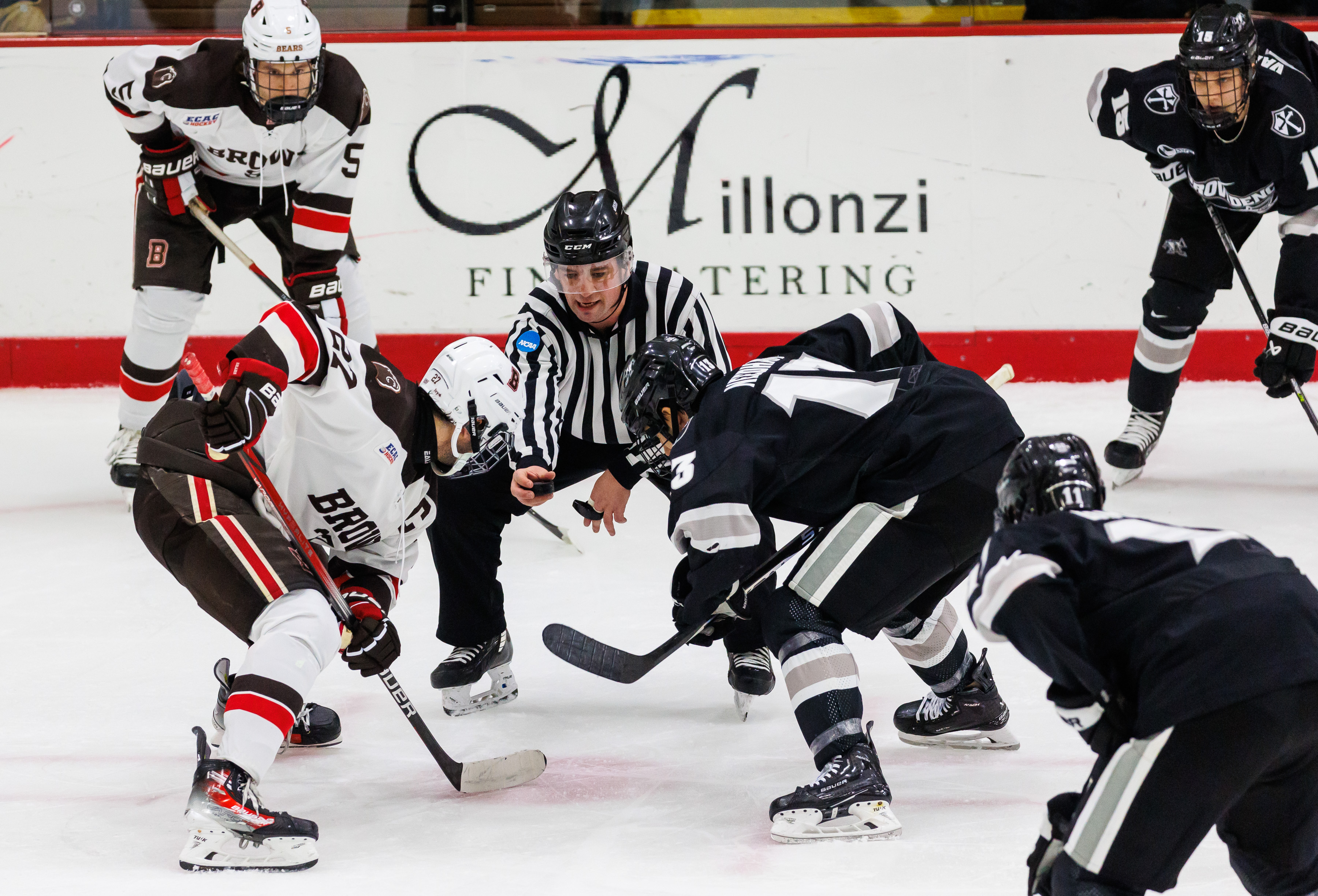
A referee prepares to drop the puck for a face-off during a December 2023 NCAA game between Brown (left) and Providence

Hockey face-offs (also called 'bully', and originally called 'puck-offs') are generally handled by centres, but are sometimes handled by wingers, and, rarely, by defensemen. One of the referees drops the puck at centre ice to start each period and following the scoring of a goal. The linesmen are responsible for all other face-offs.

One player from each team stands at the face-off spot (see below) to await the drop of the puck. All teammates must be lateral to or behind the player taking the face-off. Generally, the goal of the player taking the face-off is to draw the puck backward, toward teammates; however, they will, occasionally attempt to shoot the puck forward, past the other team, usually to kill time when shorthanded although shooting directly at the net is also possible—scoring a goal directly from a face-off, while rare, is not unheard of. However, where the face-off occurs at one of the five face-off spots that have circles marked around them, only the two opposing players responsible for taking the face-off may be in the circle. A common formation, especially at centre ice, is for a skater to take the face-off, with the wings lateral to the centre on either side, and the skater, usually a defenseman, behind the player handling the face-off, one toward each side. This is not mandatory, however, and other formations are seen—especially where the face-off is in one of the four corner face-off spots.

==== Location ====
Face-offs are typically conducted at designated places marked on the ice called face-off spots or dots. There are nine such spots: two in each attacking zone, two on each end of the neutral zone, and one in the centre of the rink. Face-offs did not always take place at the marked face-off spots. If a puck left the playing surface, for example, the face-off would take place wherever the puck was last played. On June 20, 2007, the NHL Board of Governors approved a change to NHL Rule 76.2, which governs face-off locations. The rule now requires that all face-offs take place at one of the nine face-off spots on the ice, regardless of what caused the stoppage of play. Rule 76.2 also dictates that, with some exceptions, a face-off following a penalty must occur at one of the two face-off dots of the offending team's end.

An official may remove the player taking the face-off if the player or any players from the same team attempt to gain an unfair advantage during the face-off (called a face-off violation). When a player is removed, one of the teammates not originally taking the face-off is required to take the face-off. Common face-off violations include: moving the stick before the puck is dropped, not placing the stick properly when requested to do so, not placing the body square to the face-off spot, or encroachment into the face-off circle by a teammate. In the NHL, the player from the visiting team is required to place his stick on the ice for the face-off first when it takes place at the centre-line dot. For all other face-offs, the player from the defending team must place his stick first. Before the league's 2015–16 season, the visiting player was required to place his stick first on all face-offs. A player who does faceoffs as a speciality is sometimes called or deemed a Face-Off Specialist.

Faceoff location
Event	No delayed penalty	Delayed penalty
Start of period	centre spot	
Goal	centre spot	
Hand pass	neutral spot closest to puck	
High-sticking puck	spot closest to where puck contacted high stick or was last played by offending team, whichever is closer to offending team's goal	neutral spot of attacking team
Puck in crowd	neutral spot closest to shot or deflection	neutral spot of attacking team
Icing	defending spot of attacking team	neutral spot of attacking team
Intentional Offside	defending spot of attacking team	defending spot of defending team
Offside	neutral spot of defending team (usually)	defending spot of defending team
Offside called in error	neutral spot of defending team (usually)	defending spot of defending team
Icing called in error	centre spot (except USA Hockey)	defending spot of defending team
Icing called in error	defending spot of defending team (USA Hockey)	defending spot of defending team
Goalie freezes puck	defending spot of defending team	
Penalty	defending spot of offending team	

==== History ====
In the first organized ice hockey rules (see Amateur Hockey Association of Canada, AHAC), both centres faced the centre line of the ice rink, like the wingers do today. At that time, another forward position existed, the rover, who faced forward like centres did today, but a few feet away. The opposing forwards would whack the ice on their own side of the puck three times, then strike each other's stick above the puck, and then scramble for the puck. This manoeuvre was known as 'bully'. The Winnipeg players invented what is today known as a 'face-off'. In Germany and other countries the term 'bully' is still commonly used.

=== Field hockey ===
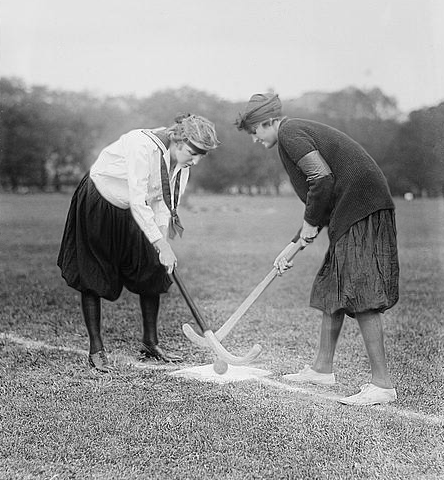
Two female field hockey players prepare to start or resume the match with a bully-off in the centre of the pitch.

A similar technique, known as a bully, is used in field hockey. The two opposing players alternately touch their sticks on the ground and against each other before attempting to strike the ball. Its use as the method of starting play was discontinued in 1981.

=== Bandy ===
In bandy, play begins with a "stroke off" with each team confined to its own half of the bandy pitch. However, the game is restarted with a face-off when the game has been temporarily interrupted. The face-off is executed on the place where the ball was situated when the game was interrupted. If the ball was inside the penalty area when the game was interrupted, the face-off is moved to the nearest free-stroke point on the penalty line.

In a face-off one player of each team place themselves opposite each other and with their backs turned to their own end-lines. The sticks are held parallel to each other and on each side of the ball. The ball must not be touched until the referee has blown his whistle. At face-off the ball may be played in any direction.

In bandy, face-offs are regulated in section 4.6 of the Bandy Playing Rules set up by the Federation of International Bandy (FIB).

=== Floorball ===
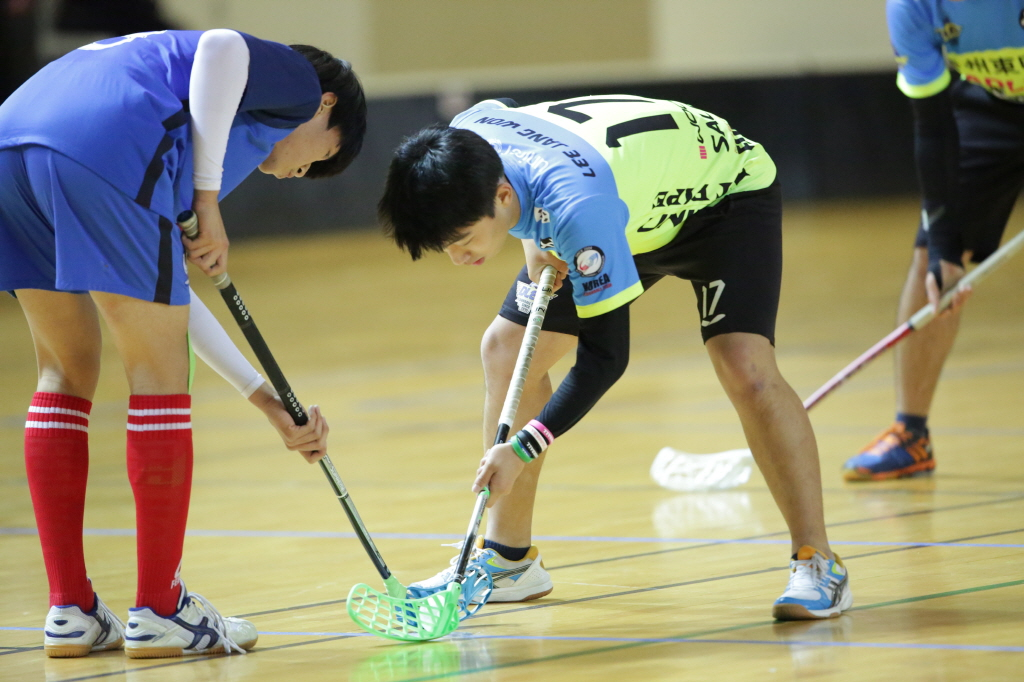
Face-off in floorball

Floorball is a type of floor hockey with five players and a goalkeeper in each team, it's played indoors with a tennis sized ball. Matches are played in three twenty-minute periods and just like ice hockey it begins with a face-off.

=== Broomball ===
Like in ice hockey, a game of broomball begins with a face-off.

=== Rinkball ===
Rinkball, a sport combining bandy and ice hockey elements, also begins with a face-off.

== Lacrosse ==
=== Field lacrosse ===
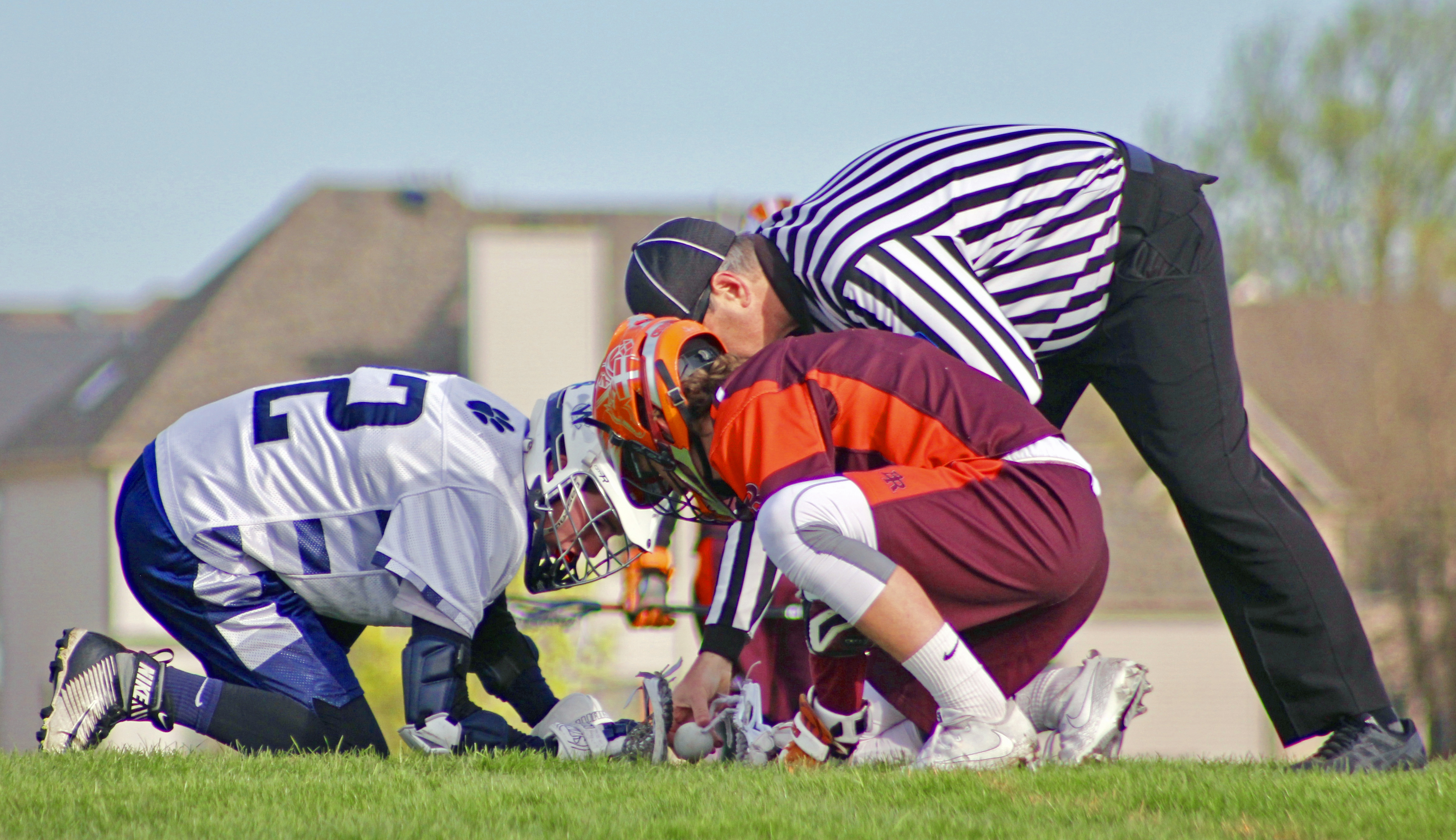
Two lacrosse players set for a face-off as the referee places the ball on the ground between the heads of their sticks.

Face-offs are used in men's field lacrosse after each goal, and to start every quarter and overtime periods, unless a team playing man-up controls the ball at the end of the previous quarter.

In the field lacrosse face-off, two players face each other at the X in the middle of the field, in a crouching position with the ball placed on the ground on the center line between the heads of their sticks, set four inches (10 cm) apart, parallel to the midline but the ends pointing in opposite directions. Two other players from each team must wait behind wing lines, 20 yards from the faceoff spot on opposite sides of the field until the whistle.

Any player except the goalkeeper, due to the much larger head on his stick, can face off; in practice face-offs are usually taken by midfielders. When a team is down a player due to a penalty, there will only be one other midfielder on the wing, or none if two or more players are serving time. When a third player, the maximum allowed by the rules before penalties are stacked, is serving time, the team thus penalized is allowed to have one of its defensemen come out and play on the wing during a faceoff.

Players facing off must rest their stick in their gloved hands on the ground and position themselves entirely to the left of their sticks' heads. They may kneel or keep both feet on the ground. Between the time they go down into position and the referee's whistle, the players facing off must remain still. A premature movement by any player will be called as a technical foul, and the other team will be awarded the ball. To ensure that they remain still, referees are instructed to time their whistle differently on every face-off.

At the whistle, each face-off player makes a move to clamp the ball under their stick head, or tries to direct the ball to their teammates on the wing. Only those six players can attempt to pick up the ball at first. The three attackmen and defensemen from either team must remain in their respective zones behind the restraining lines 20 yards (18 m) from the center line. Once possession is established, or the loose ball crosses either restraining line, the faceoff is considered to have ended and all players are allowed to leave their zones.

If the loose ball goes out of bounds on a face-off before either team can pick it up, it is awarded to the team that last touched it and all other players are released when play is restarted.

The players facing off may not step on or hold each other's sticks to prevent the other from getting the ball. Nor may they trap the ball beneath their sticks without attempting a "tennis pickup" to prevent anyone from establishing possession, an action normally penalized as withholding the ball from play, another technical foul. If they pick the ball up on the back of their stick but do not immediately flip it into the pocket, it is also considered withholding. In all these cases the face-off will be ended with the ball awarded to the opposing team at the spot of the infraction. Players facing off who deliberately handle or touch the ball in an attempt to gain possession, or use their open hand to hold the opposing face-off player's stick, receive a three-minute unreleasable penalty for unsportsmanlike conduct in addition to possession being awarded to the other team.

Under NCAA rules in college lacrosse, if a team violates rules specific to face-offs, either by false starts before them by any player at midfield or illegal actions by the players facing off, more than twice in a half, each additional violation results in a 30-second penalty assessed against the team, to be served by the designated "in-home" player.

A player who does faceoffs as a speciality is called a Face-Off Specialist. Also nicknamed a "FOGO", which stands for "face off, get off".

=== Women's lacrosse ===
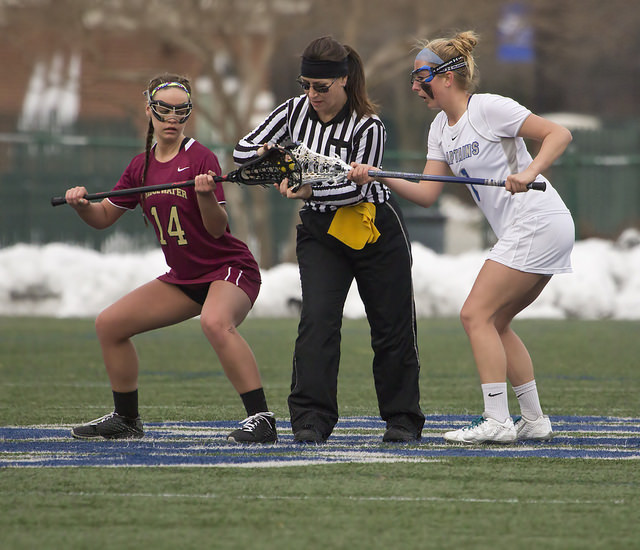
Players preparing for a draw in women's lacrosse game

In women's lacrosse, a procedure similar to a face-off is also used, although it is called a draw. The two players taking the draw stand at the center of the field, and hold their sticks together at waist level while the referee places the ball between the heads, which face each other. Four other players from each team stand on the outside of a 30-foot (9.1 m) center circle. At the whistle, the two center players both lift their sticks, tossing the ball in the air, while the players on the outside attempt to gain possession when it comes down.

== Similar rules in other sports ==
A face-off is also similar to other methods used to start or resume play in a variety of other sports. All of these involve two opposing players attempting to gain control of the ball after it is released by an official.

A jump ball in basketball, a ball-up in Australian rules football, and a throw-up in gaelic games and shinty, all involve an official throwing the ball upwards into the air after which players must play for the ball.

In water polo, the game starts with a swim-off. The ball is set in the middle of the pool, and when the whistle blows the teams race towards it to get possession. The same procedure happens after scoring.

A dropped-ball (if contested) is a method used in association football whereby an official will drop the ball rather than releasing it into the air.

=== Shinty ===
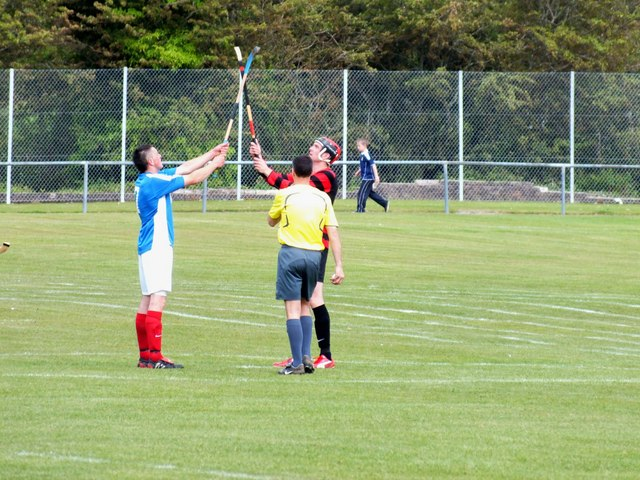
A shinty match begins with a throw-up in the centre of the shinty pitch.

A technique, known as a throw-up, is used in the stick-and-ball sport of shinty. A game of shinty begins with referee throwing the ball into the air between two opposing players whose sticks, called "camans", are raised in the air. The players must play for the ball in the air.

=== American football ===
An event similar to a face-off has been attempted in at least two leagues of American football: the 2001 instance of the XFL instituted an "opening scramble", replacing the coin toss, in which one player from each team attempted to recover a loose football after a twenty-yard dash. The team whose player recovered the ball got first choice of kicking, receiving, or defending one side of the field.

Because of an extremely high rate of injury in these events (in the league's first game, one XFL player was lost for the season after separating his shoulder in a scramble), the event has not gained mainstream popularity in most other football leagues. X-League Indoor Football nonetheless adopted a modified version opening scramble (using the name "X-Dash") when it began play in 2014, but tweaked to avoid the injuries so that each player chased after their own ball.

==== Coin toss ====
The coin toss remains the method of choice for determining possession at the beginning of an American football game.

== See also ==
- Scrum
- Staring
- Weigh-in
