= Rink bandy =

Ballgame-team sport played on ice

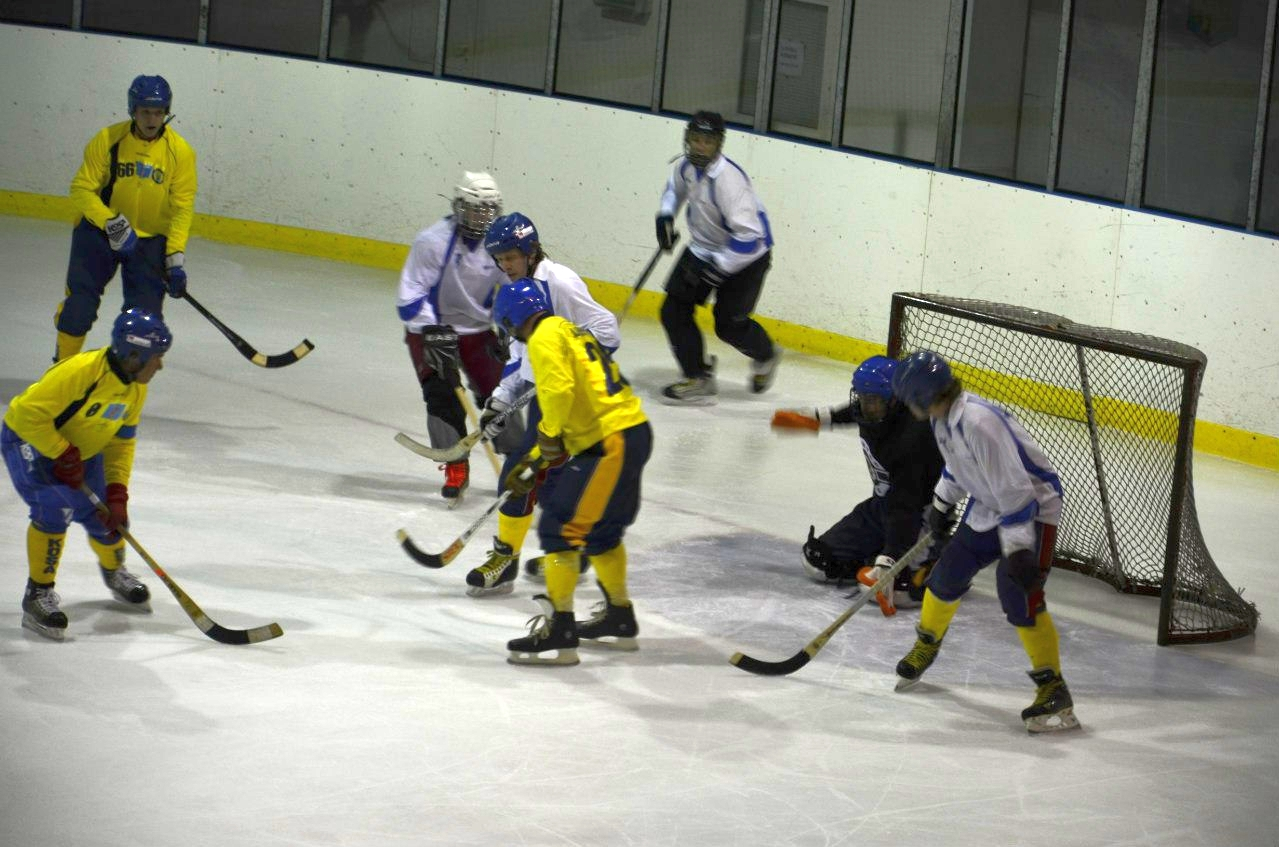
- Rink bandy being played in Dnipro, Ukraine
- Highest governing body: Federation of International Bandy
- First played: 1960's in Sweden

Characteristics
- Contact: No
- Team members: 5-6 players per side
- Type: Team sport; Winter sport
- Equipment: Bandy skates; Bandy ball; Bandy sticks; Protective gear
- Venue: Ice rink

Presence
- Country or region: Sweden, Russia, Finland, USA
- Olympic: No
- Paralympic: No

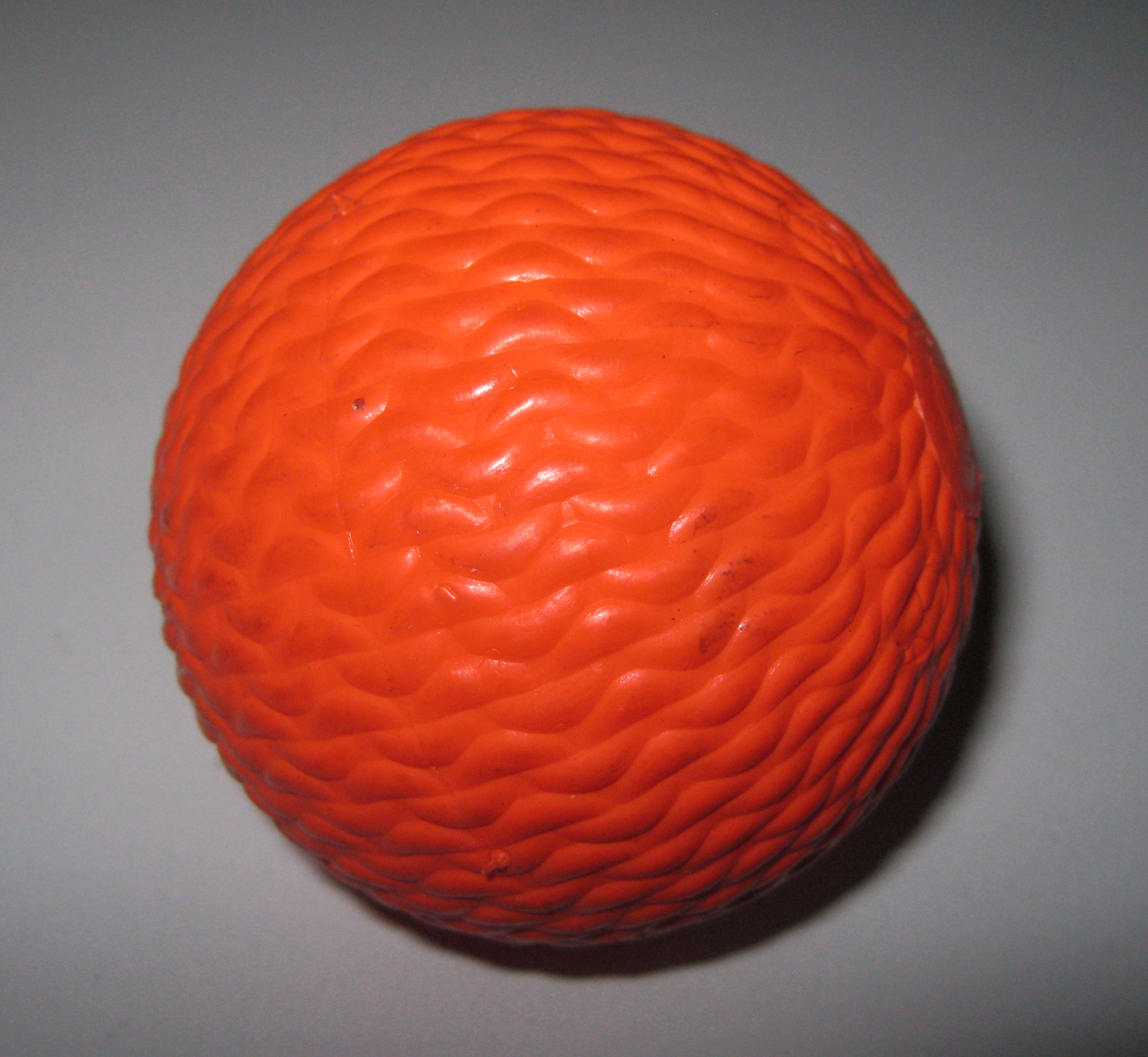
The ball used in rink bandy. The ball color is either cerise or orange

Rink bandy is a variant of the larger sport of bandy. Unlike bandy which is played on a large bandy field, rink bandy is played on significantly smaller ice hockey-sized ice rinks.

While a bandy field is about the same size as a football pitch, rink bandy is played on ice hockey rinks.

== History ==
Rink bandy originated in Sweden in the 1960s and was originally called hockeybockey. With the arrival of indoor ice hockey arenas, it was a way for bandy players to practice on ice for a longer time through the year by making use of the new indoor facilities. Since bandy fields are much larger than ice hockey rinks, playing surfaces for bandy were still only made outdoors in the wintertime when artificial freezing was unnecessary.

The game of rink bandy uses a bandy ball and bandy sticks. The goalkeeper has no stick. A rink bandy game lasts 60 minutes but is composed of either two 30 minute halves or three 20 minute periods. Similar rules to bandy are used, but they are simplified to increase the pace of the game. Checking is prohibited, making the sport relatively safer than its relatives.

Because of the smaller playing area used in rink bandy compared to its larger parent sport, there are fewer players, normally six a side. In America, the USA Rink Bandy League, uses five players instead of the usual six because of the smaller ice hockey rinks in the USA. In Henderson, Nevada, an annual invitational tournament takes place.

== Organization ==
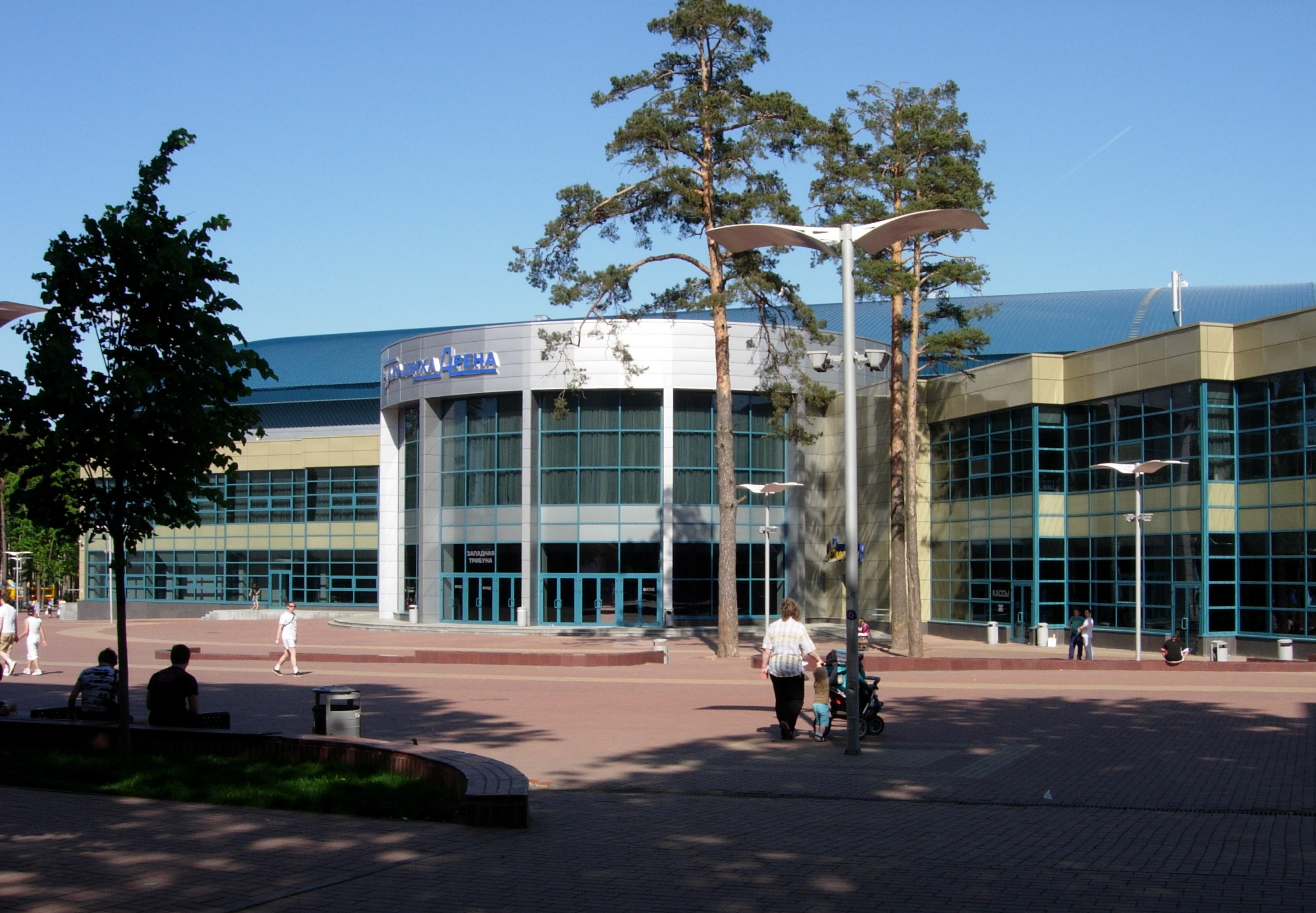
Balashikha Arena, where the 2017 Russian Rink Bandy Cup took place.

Rink bandy is governed by the Federation of International Bandy. In its quest to have bandy accepted into the programme of the Winter Olympics, rink bandy is an important way for the Federation of International Bandy to gain more members, thus also spreading bandy, since many countries which lack a full-size field and where the game is still new, only play rink bandy at home but still participate in the Bandy World Championship.

As artificially frozen and indoor bandy arenas have become more prevalent, the interest for rink bandy has dwindled in the main bandy-playing nations (Russia, Sweden, Finland, Norway). There are still several rink bandy tournaments in Russia, including the Patriarch Cup (Турнир на призы Святейшего Патриарха Московского и всея Руси) for children at Moscow's Red Square.

A world cup for rink bandy clubs was held every year from 1984 to 1998 in Hofors, Sweden, and called Hofors World Cup. Rink bandy was included in the programme of the 2012 European Company Sports Games and a European championship existed, though there is currently no top-level international competition. However, in 2017 the Federation of International Bandy decided to hold an international tournament for developing bandy countries in Nymburk, Czech Republic and an international rink bandy club competition called Dniprobandy has been organised by the Ukrainian Bandy and Rink bandy Federation. In Germany, the national bandy championship is played under rink bandy rules.

== Short bandy ==
A new variant of bandy played at a small field has been developed in Czechia. It is called ’Czech bandy’ or ’short bandy’ and is intended to more closely resemble usual bandy with its larger goal cages and smaller borders. During the 2025-26 season, it was approved by the Federation of International Bandy as an official discipline. In September of 2026, the first international tournament was played in Switzerland. called 2026 Short Bandy Swiss Cup, with club teams from Germany, the Netherlands, and Switzerland.

== See also ==
- Bandy
- Rinkball
- Bando
- Pond hockey
- Ice hockey
