= Bandy field =

Playing field where bandy games are played

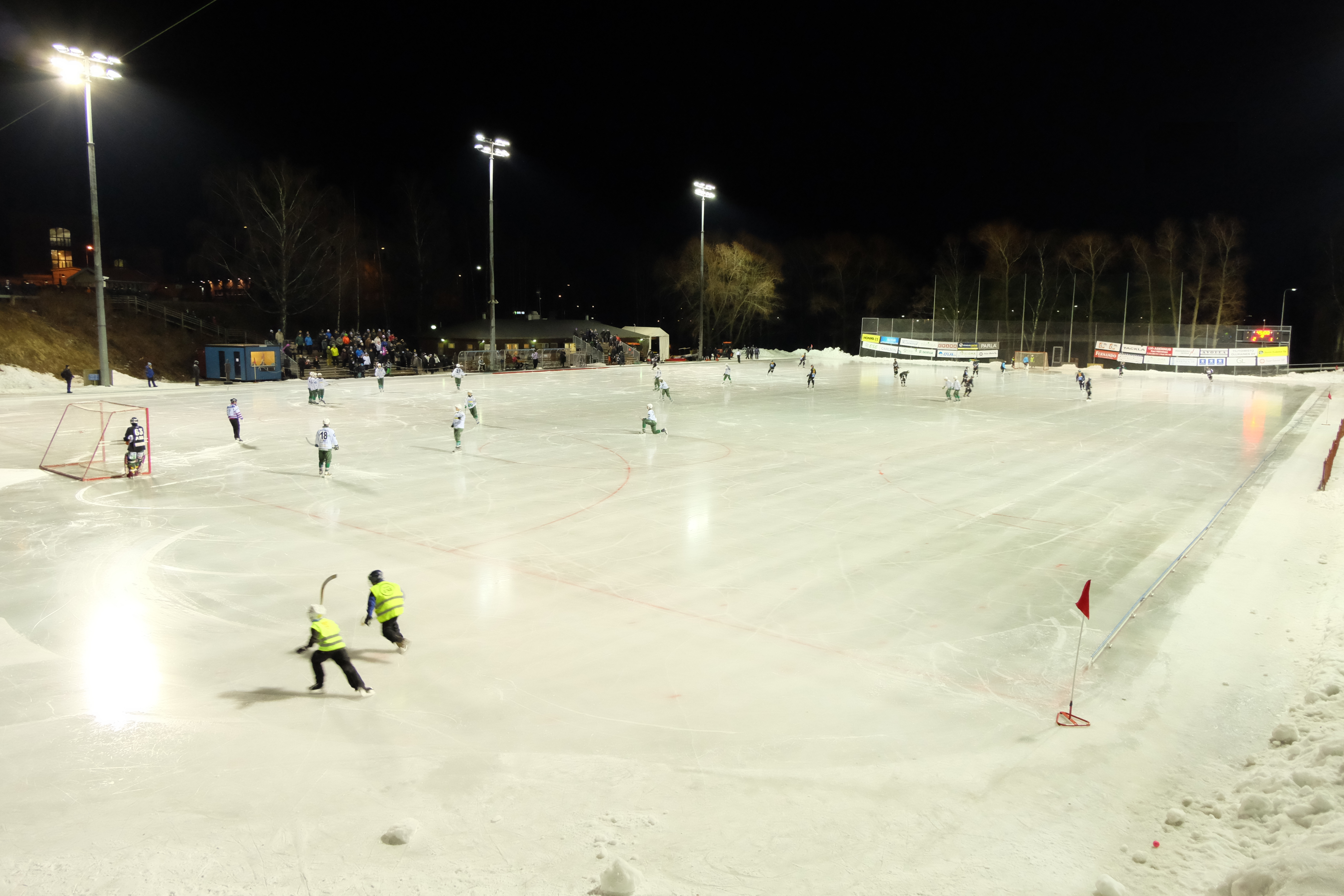
A bandy field in Finland. The skaters in yellow vests in the foreground are ball boys.

A bandy field or bandy rink is a large ice rink used for playing the team winter sport of bandy. Being about the size of a football pitch, it is substantially larger than an ice hockey rink.

== History ==
Originally, bandy was played on naturally frozen ice, mainly on lakes. Teams often had to take time to go out and search for the best ice to use. Soon, ice started to be created on soccer pitches in the wintertime, allowing for a more safe place to play. This may be the reason the outer measurements are the same as for a soccer field. The first artificially frozen bandy field was created in Budapest, Hungary, in 1923. In the 1980s, indoor arenas started to be built, allowing for a longer season. The world's first indoor bandy arena, the Olimpiyskiy, was built in Moscow for the 1980 Summer Olympics but has hosted many bandy events since.

== Size ==
Standard field measurements, set in the Bandy Playing Rules

The size of a bandy field is regulated in section 1.1 of the Bandy Playing Rules set up by the Federation of International Bandy It shall be rectangular and in the range 4,050–7,150 square metres (43,600–77,000 sq ft) (45–65 metres (148–213 ft) by 90–110 metres (300–360 ft)), about the same size as a football pitch for association football and considerably larger than an ice hockey rink. For international play, the field must not be smaller than 100 metres (330 ft) by 60 metres (200 ft). The field is outlined with distinct and unbroken lines according to section 1.1. These lines are red and 5–8 centimetres (2.0–3.1 in) wide, according to section 1.1 D.

== Sidelines and borders ==
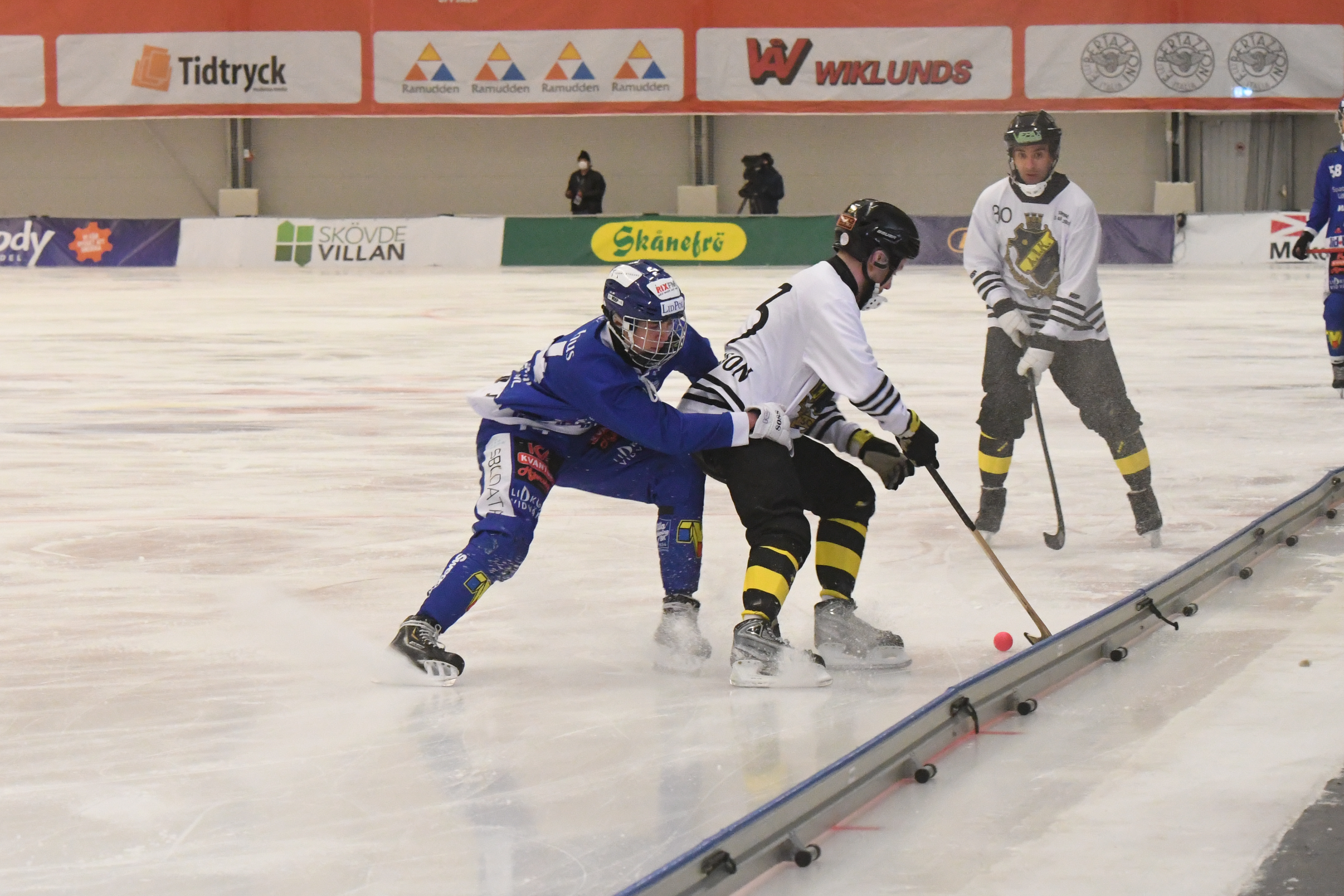
Sideline on the field

Along the sidelines, section 1.2 of the Rules prescribes the use of a 15 cm (6 in) high border (board, vant, sarg, wand, wall) to be placed to prevent the ball from leaving the ice. It should not be attached to the ice, it should be able to glide upon collisions, and should end 1–3 metres (3 ft 3 in – 9 ft 10 in) away from the corners, to allow for corner-strokes. The top should have soft protection, to avoid players getting hurt if touching it when coming at high speed. The border was originally only used in the Russian rulebook, but was introduced in the 1950s to the countries which had until then played according to the Scandinavian (originally English) rules, when the rules of the game were standardized and the international governing federation was founded. It allows for a faster game, as the ball is more likely to stay in play instead of easily leaving the field, which means it would have to be collected and thrown in.

If the border is frozen to the ice during play, this can be hazardous to the players, and the referee can therefore decide to start or continue the game without such border. The same applies if strong wind relocates the border, under such circumstances the match can also be started or continued without border. This is regulated in comment section C1.8 of the Rules.

The border is made of sections which each should be about 4 metres (13 ft) long according to section 1.2 of the Rules. Section 1.3 of the Rules prescribes where players must and must not enter or leave the field: Four of these sections of the border shall be painted red on the front side as well as on the backside. These four sections are placed at the middle of the side-line on one side of the field, in front of the players' benches. All exchange of players from both teams must take place over these red-painted border pieces, i.e. over a part of the border which is about 16 m long. According to comment section C3.3 of the Rules, a player who is to be replaced, shall have left the rink before the replacing player can enter the game. Section 1.3 also states that the erroneous exchange of players is to be punished with a penalty of 5 minutes for the in-going player (this length of penalty is shown by the referee displaying a white penalty card).

== Centre line and corners ==
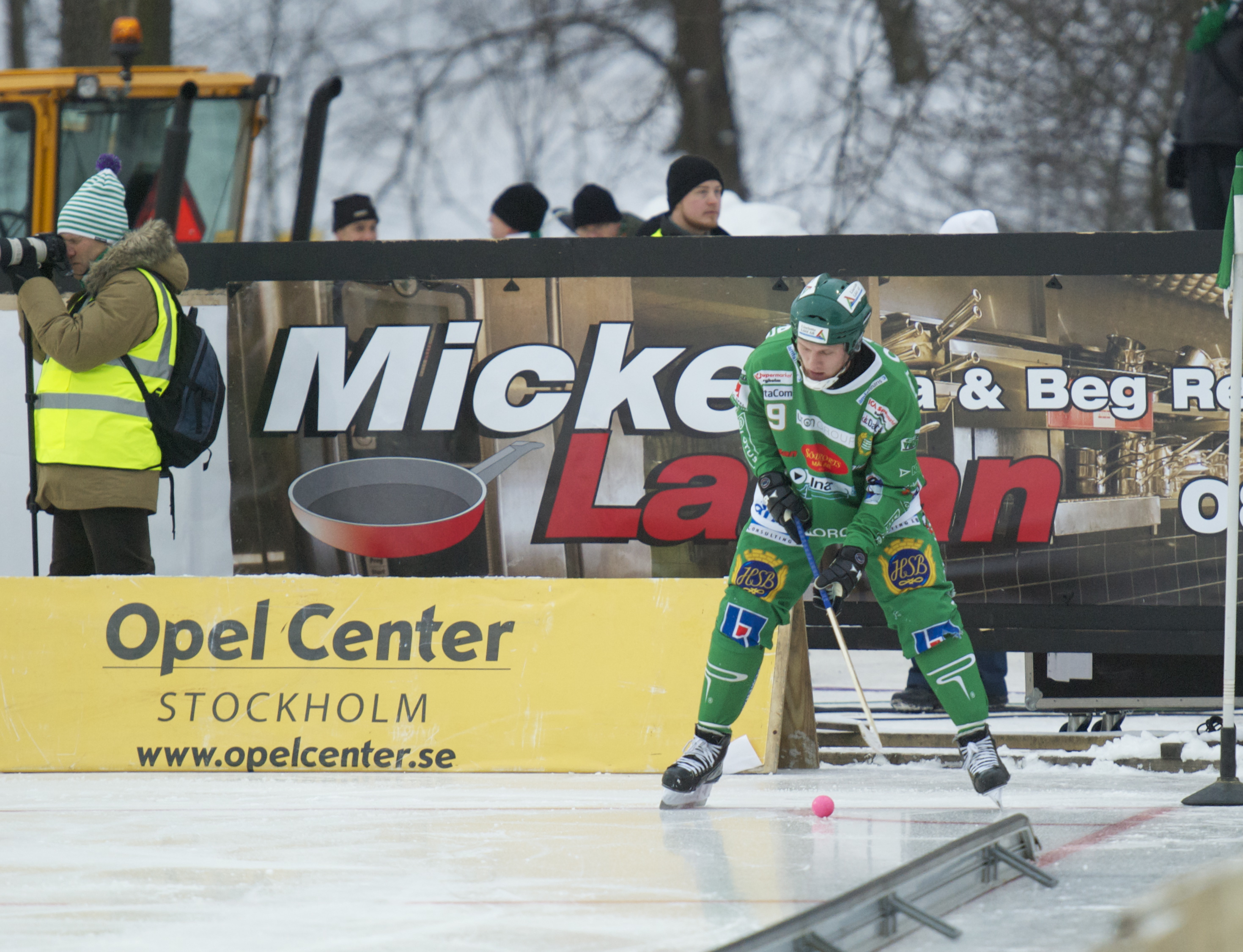
Player on a corner stroke

A centre spot denotes the centre of the field and a circle of radius 5 m (16 ft) is centered at it. A centre-line is drawn through the centre spot and parallel with the shortlines.

At each of the corners, a 1 m (3 ft 3 in) radius quarter-circle is drawn, and a dotted line is painted parallel to the shortline and 5 metres (16 ft) away from it without extending into the penalty area. The dotted line can be replaced with a 0.5-metre (1 ft 8 in) long line starting at the edge of the penalty area and extending toward the sideline, 5 metres (16 ft) from the shortline.

== Goal cage ==
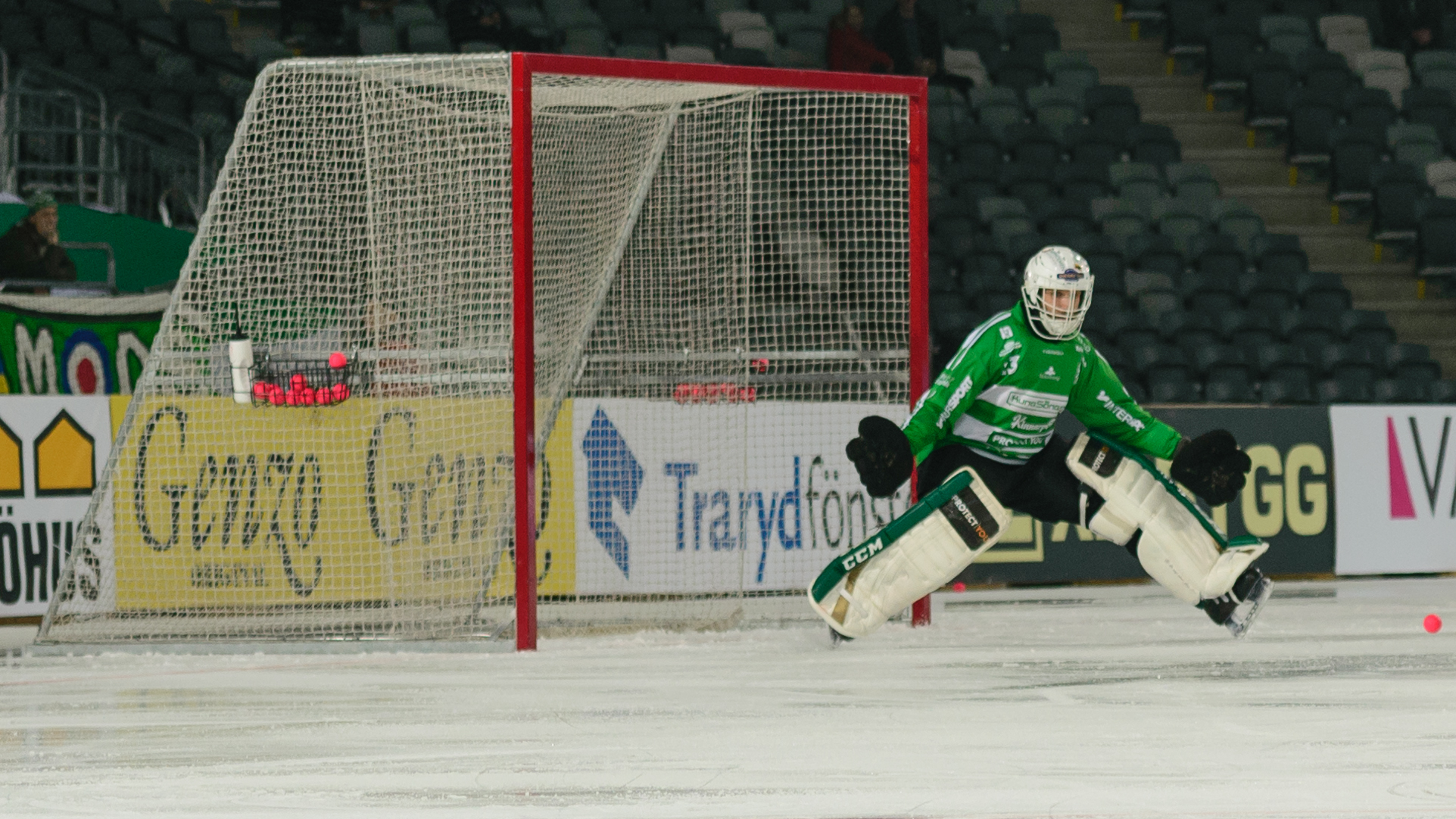
Goal cage and goalkeeper

Centered at each short-line is a 3.5 m (11 ft) wide and 2.1 m (6 ft 11 in) high goal cage, regulated to size, form, material and other properties in section 1.4 of the Rules. The cage may be made of wood, aluminium or steel and has a net to stop the ball when it has crossed the goal-line. The goal-line is the line between the goalposts; section 1.1. The cage shall be of an approved model; the approvement is made by the appropriate governing body. It shall be fitted with small spikes on underside to prevent the goal from being moved by the wind or by minor touch of a player, so that it stays in place. As long as the goal cage stays in place, the match can go on. For safety reasons, the goal-posts shall not have any sharp edges. The goal cage also has two ball baskets, one on each outer side; section 1.4 A. Balls are stored there for the goal-keeper to use when he is to set a ball in play if the ball has been shot over the end line at the side of the goal by a player from the opponent team. This allows the game to start up quicker when this has happened.

In front of the goal cage is a half-circular penalty area with a 17 m (56 ft) radius. A penalty spot is located 12 metres (39 ft) in front of the goal and there are two free-stroke spots at the penalty area line, each surrounded by a 5 m (16 ft) circle.

== Ice condition ==
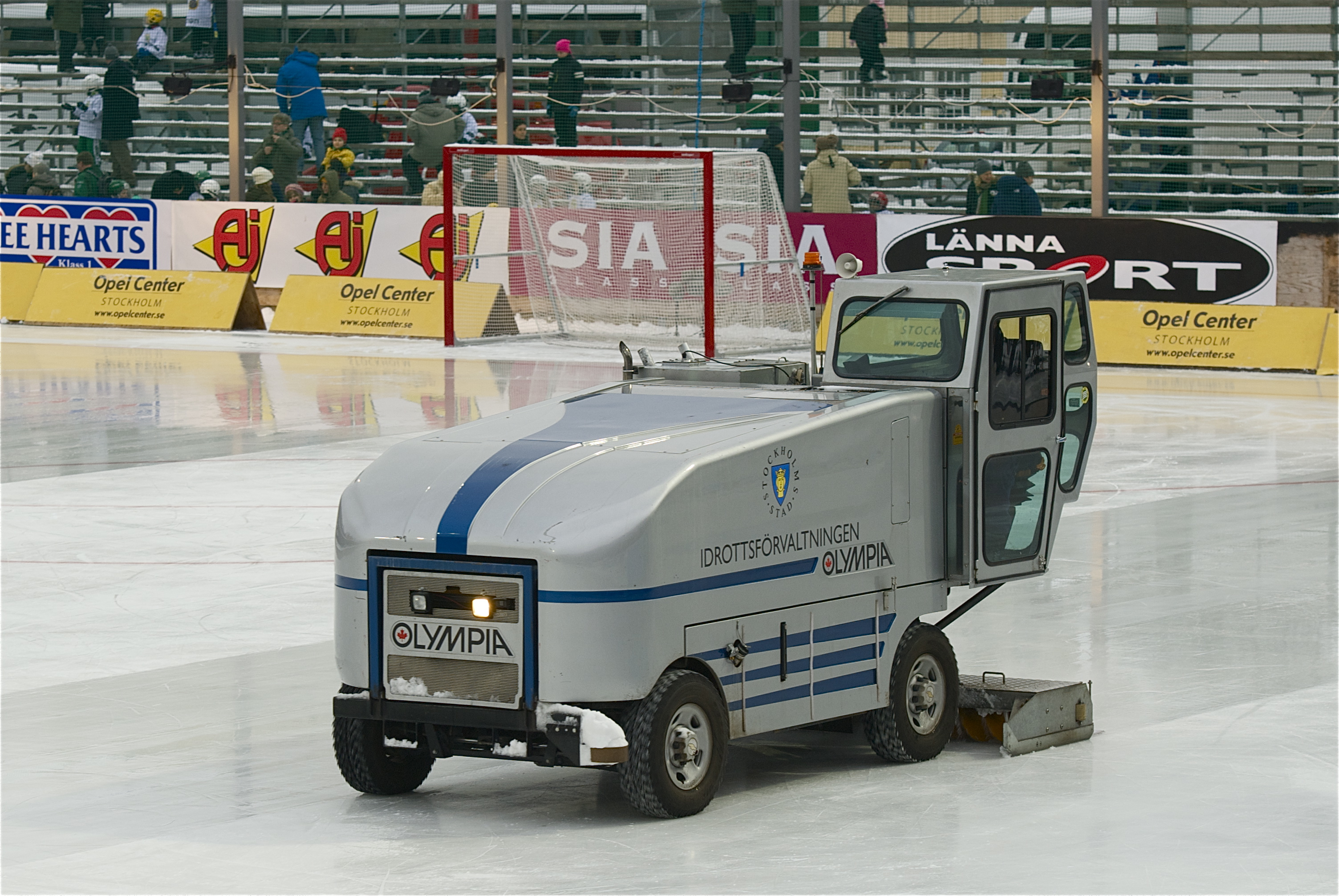
Ice resurfacer cleaning and smoothing the bandy field

Especially for naturally frozen ice, it may occur that the ice is in too bad condition to play on. The ice shall be inspected by the referee before the game. If the referee deems that the condition of the ice is too bad, comment sections C1.1 and C1.2 allows him to decide that the match has to be cancelled. No one but the referee is allowed to decide on cancellation because of the condition of the ice (but this does not mean that either team is unable to alert the attention of the referee regarding some part of the condition of the ice).

Deficiencies of the rink, including inferior ice quality, are the responsibility of the organiser of the match and according to comment section C1.4 deficiencies shall be reported to the administrative authority.

== Outdoor and indoor arenas ==
Originally, bandy was played on frozen lakes. Football fields were used soon after this, by pouring water on them in the wintertime to get a good, flat and safe ice surface.

Starting in the 1980s, and increasingly since 2000, more and more indoor bandy arenas have been built, especially in Russia and Sweden. Indoor rinks provides a more stable climate for the ice and thus better, more reliable surfaces, but many fans of the sport claim they take away much of the traditional feeling around the game, where the weather was a factor to consider for the teams.
