= Kosa (sports manufacturer) =

Sports equipment manufacturer

Kosa is a Swedish sports equipment manufacturer, situated in Motala, Sweden and mainly concentrated on equipment for bandy. Kosa is one of the leading brands in the sport, making bandy sticks, bandy balls, and other equipment.

Apart from manufacturing, Kosa also sponsor major teams in Sweden and Russia. Kosa also arrange cup tournaments for children, to interest more children for physical exercise in general and the sport of bandy in particular.;)
