= Rinkball =

Team sport played on ice, using sticks, ice skates, and a ball

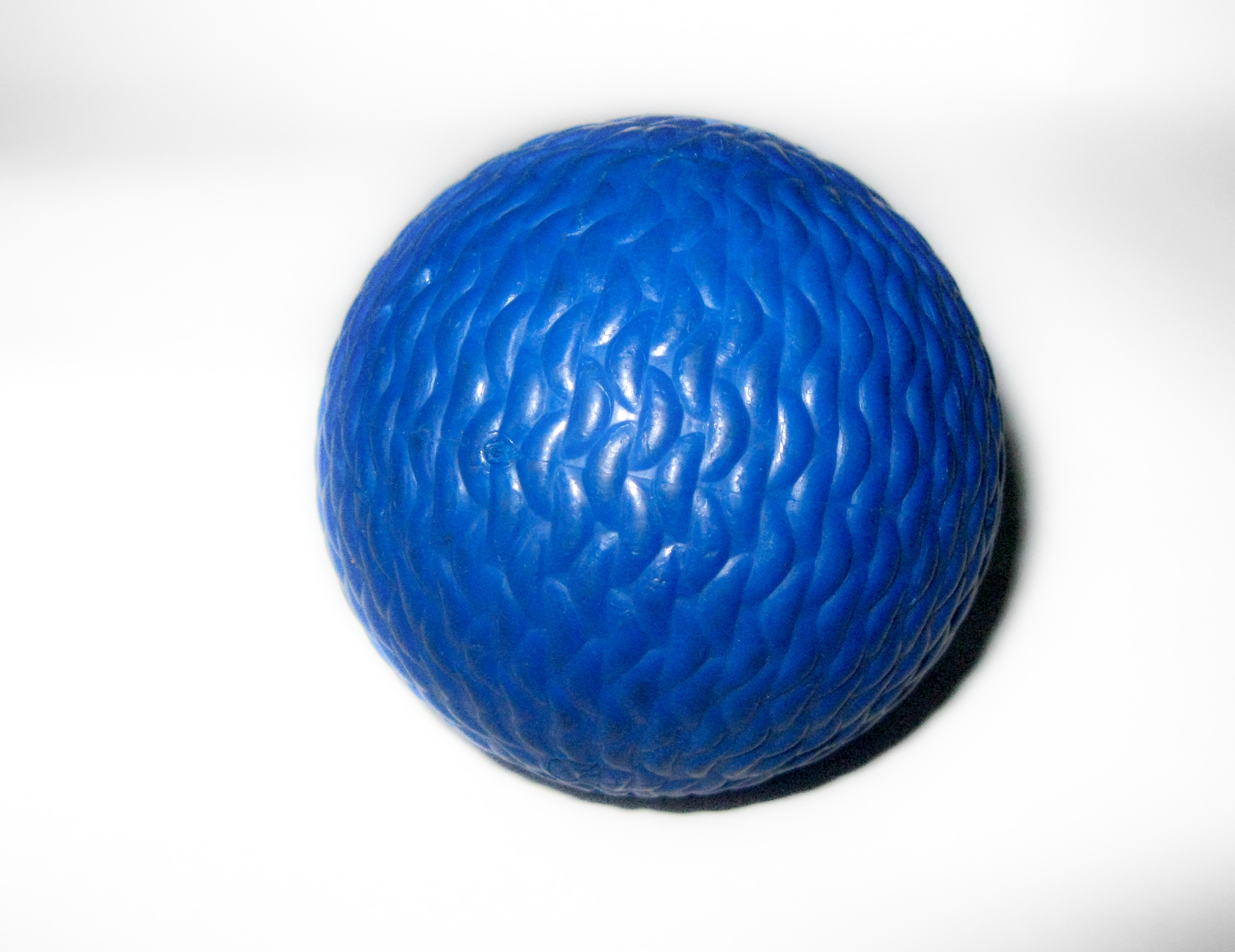
- Ball used in the sport of rinkball. The ball color is blue
- Highest governing body: International Rinkball Federation
- First played: 1960s; 65 years ago Sweden

Characteristics
- Contact: – Limited – body checking illegal
- Type: Team sport; Winter sport
- Equipment: Bandy skates (most often); Ice hockey skates (less often); Blue bandy ball; Rinkball sticks; Protective gear
- Venue: Ice rink

Presence
- Country or region: Finland
- Olympic: No
- Paralympic: No
- World Games: No

Rinkball is a winter team sport played on ice with ice skates and is most popular in Finland, where it is known as kaukalopallo. This ball sport originated in Sweden in the 1960s and from there landed in Finland in the 1970s.

The objective of a game is to score more goals than the opposing team. A bandy ball is used, but the ball is slightly smaller and blue instead of the orange or cerise used in bandy. Rinkball sticks are a sport specific design.

Rinkball combines elements of bandy, rink bandy, and ice hockey, but is now a separately organized sport after developing its own organizing bodies, codifying its own rules, and having designed its own sport-specific equipment.

== History ==
The sport was initially formed as a practice drill for bandy players in Sweden who were using indoor ice hockey rinks in the summer half of the year when the weather was too hot for outdoor ice fields even with artificial ice. The first Finnish championships were held in 1975. However, the sport didn't come to the attention of the wider public in Finland until the 1980s with the first Finland-Sweden international game played in 1984. In 1990, a rinkball game between the men's Finnish rinkball team and the newly crowned national Swedish bandy champion team, Västerås SK Bandy, resulted in a blowout with the rinkball team winning 13–3. This event helped further the fact that the two sports, bandy and rinkball, had become very different games.

== Rinkball rules ==
Rules for rinkball are set in Finland and there are also separate rules for the Championship Series.

The playing time is 3 × 20 minutes of effective playing time, i.e. the clock is stopped with game breaks (men's league and 1st division). In the lower series, the playing time is 2 × 30 minutes of running time. In that case, the clock will only be stopped during overtime or a penalty shot, or if there is a longer delay in the game e.g. in the case of a player being injured. Even in running time, the clock will be stopped during the last 2 minutes of the match for all interruptions.

The team may have a maximum of 17 or 20 players on their roster and two goalkeepers (depending on the series) of which one goalkeeper and five field players may be on the ice at a time. The team has the opportunity to pull and replace the goalkeeper with another player.

Checking is prohibited and players are not allowed to lift an opposing player's stick. There is no offsides in rinkball.

== Rinkball equipment ==
Mandatory equipment for field players includes a helmet, neck guard, ice skates, and a rinkball stick.

=== Ball ===
The ball used is like a bandy ball but is 6 centimeters in diameter, weighs about 60 grams, and is blue in color.

=== Sticks ===
Rinkball sticks have a sport–specific design and come in one length, roughly just over a metre long, giving shorter players an offensive edge while enabling taller players to dominate defensively. Rinkball sticks bear a closer resemblance to ice hockey sticks than they do to bandy sticks.

=== Ice skates ===
Rinkball does not have an ice skate designed specifically for the sport. The players either use bandy skates or ice hockey skates, with bandy skates being the most prevalent.

=== Goalkeeper ===
Mandatory equipment for the goalkeeper involves skates, a helmet with a face shield or mask, a neck guard, and goalkeeper shin guards or knee pads (width up to 28 cm). The goalkeeper has a catch glove or "fin" in each hand, the palm of which must be able to be spread completely open, so that its diameter must not exceed 28 cm at any point. The maximum width of the bracelet is 15 cm. The goalkeeper does not have a stick.

== National championships ==
In Finland, the national rinkball championships is the Kaukalopallon SM-sarja.

== International ==
The International Rinkball Federation (IRF) was founded in 1992 with Russia, Hungary and Switzerland among its first founding members. Sweden, Norway, the United States and Canada did not join in the beginning. By the late 1990s the international organization included Russia, Sweden, Kazakhstan, Estonia, Switzerland, Hungary, Finland, and the United States.

The first Rinkball World Championship for men was held in Omsk, Russia, in 1998.

The sport's largest national organization is in Finland. Known as the Finnish Rinkball Federation to English speakers, it has 1,000 teams, including women, men and children. Play is divided into eight male divisions, two female divisions, and children's play is divided by age.

== Notable people ==
- Hanna-Riikka Sallinen (née Nieminen, previously Välilä; born 12 June 1973) – won the European Championship gold in women's rinkball in 1989.
- Antero Kivelä - Kivelä coached Pori's Kärpät

== See also ==
- Luettelo kaukalopallon SM-mitalisteista - List of medalists in rinkball in Finland
- Suomen Kaukalopallo- ja Ringetteliitto (SKRL ry) - known in English as the "Finland Rinkball (Suomen Kaukalopalloliitto) and Ringette Association", this organization ran both sports associations jointly between 2013 and 2020
- Bandy
- Rink bandy
- Pond hockey
- Ice hockey
