= Icing (ice hockey) =

Ice hockey rule

Example "A" is not icing, as the puck is shot from inside the defending team's half. Example "B" is icing, provided that it is not "waved off" for an eligible reason (e.g. offensive team is short-handed)

In ice hockey, icing is an infraction that occurs when a player shoots, bats, or deflects the puck from their own half (over the center red line) of the ice, beyond the opposing team's goal line, without scoring a goal.

The icing rule has three variations: touch icing, no-touch (also called automatic icing), and hybrid icing. Many professional leagues use hybrid icing, while many amateur leagues worldwide use no-touch or automatic icing.

== Description ==
Icing occurs when a player shoots, bats with the hand or stick, or deflects the puck over the center red line and the opposing team's red goal line, in that order, and the puck remains untouched without scoring a goal. The rule's main purpose is preventing a defending team from delaying the game by, relatively easily, sending the puck to the other side of the rink to clear it from the opposing team's attack.

=== Exceptions ===
Icing is waved off when any of the following occurs:

- The attacking team (committing the icing) is shorthanded (except under USA Hockey rules in competitions for 14-and-under age groups).
- The linesman believes a player on the defending team (other than the goaltender) could have played the puck before it crossed the goal line.
- The puck is iced directly from a player participating in a face-off.
- The defending goaltender leaves his/her goal crease and moves in the direction of the puck (except under USA Hockey rules).
- The condition for touch icing or hybrid icing is met.

It is not icing when any of the following occurs:

- The puck enters the goal. Such goals usually occur on an empty net against a team who replaced its goaltender with an extra attacker; missed empty net shots still count as icing.
- The attacking team plays the puck before it crosses the goal line.
- The puck touches the defending team (including players, the goaltender, and their skates and sticks) before it crosses the goal line.
- A player shoots the puck back towards the defending zone. For example, the player shoots the puck over the center red line and attacking team's red line, or over the defending team's red line and the center red line.

== Enforcement ==
Officials enforce the infraction. While an icing call is pending, the linesman raises an arm to indicate that a potential icing call may be made. If the icing is waved off, the official lowers their arm and gives the washout signal (extending both arms sideways from the body at shoulder height, similar to the "safe" sign in baseball but typically delivered from a less-crouched or fully upright position).

When icing occurs, a linesman stops play. Play is resumed with a faceoff in the defending zone of the attacking team, who committed the infraction. If there is a delayed penalty, it will happen at the attacking team's neutral spot. If the linesman erred in stopping play for icing, the faceoff is at the center face-off spot (unless there is a delayed penalty).

== Variations ==
The icing rule has three variations:

- touch icing
- no-touch or automatic icing
- hybrid icing

Most leagues (IIHF, National Hockey League, American Hockey League, Kontinental Hockey League, NCAA college hockey, European professional leagues, and several minor North American leagues ECHL, Central Hockey League and SPHL) use hybrid icing. Most amateur leagues worldwide (such as USA Hockey) use no-touch or automatic icing.

=== Touch icing ===
In touch icing, a player on the opposing team, other than the goaltender, must touch the puck to cause the stoppage of play. If the puck is first touched by the goaltender or a player on the team that iced the puck, icing is waved off (canceled), and play continues. The touch icing rule can lead to high-speed races for the puck.

=== No-touch or automatic icing ===
In no-touch or automatic icing, play is stopped for icing as soon as the puck crosses the goal line.

=== Hybrid icing ===
In hybrid icing, play is stopped for icing if the player on the opposing team reaches the faceoff dot first, instead of skating all the way across the goal line to touch the puck.

This type of icing is intended to reduce the number of collisions along the boards during touch icing, while still allowing the team that iced the puck to get to it first to wave off the icing. When the puck is shot around the end boards, travels down the ice and comes out the other end, the linesman judges who would have touched the puck first. If it is the defending player, he calls icing, but if it is the attacking player, he waves off the icing and lets the play continue.

== History ==
The National Hockey League (NHL) introduced the icing rule in September 1937 to eliminate a common delaying tactic used by teams to protect a winning margin. A November 18, 1931, game between the New York Americans and Boston Bruins is cited as one extreme example that led to the ban on the practice. The Americans, protecting a 3–2 lead over the Bruins at Boston Garden, iced the puck over 50 times. The crowd became incensed and threw debris onto the ice, causing a delay while the teams were sent to their dressing rooms. When the teams met again that December 3 in New York, the Bruins iced the puck 87 times in a scoreless draw.

The rule was amended in June 1951 to state the icing infraction was nullified if the goaltender touched the puck. For the 1990–91 season, the league again amended the rule, stating the infraction was nullified if the puck passed through or touched the goal crease when the goaltender had been removed for an extra attacker. The NHL amended the rule a third time; icing was nullified if the goaltender moved towards the puck as it approached the goal line.

The 1970s-era World Hockey Association (WHA) never adopted the NHL rule of allowing shorthanded teams to ice the puck. In 2009, USA Hockey considered eliminating the shorthanded icing rule, having tested its elimination in Massachusetts and Alaska in the 2007–2009 seasons.

The IIHF adopted the no-touch icing rule after an incident in the Czechoslovak First Ice Hockey League in 1990, when Luděk Čajka, rushing to get to the puck in an icing situation, crashed into the boards, suffered severe spinal injuries, and died a few weeks later.

After some teams in need of a line change (player substitution) began deliberately icing the puck to stop play, and as part of a group of important rule changes following the 2004–05 NHL lockout, the NHL supplemented the icing rule prior to the 2005–06 season by not allowing the offending team to substitute players before the next faceoff, except to replace an injured player, when the goaltender must return to the net following an icing call. This change was made in an effort to speed up game play by reducing icing infractions, as well as to encourage teams to work the puck up the ice rather than taking the opportunity to rest their players. In some junior leagues (such as the WHL), the offending team is permitted to substitute players after an icing only if the puck was shot from the neutral zone (between the defensive blue line and the red line). If the violation occurs in the defensive zone, substitution is prohibited. Regardless, in all situations, if icing is called, and then a penalty is assessed that changes the on-ice strength of either team (from 5 on 5 to 5 on 4, for example), the offending team may substitute.

The NHL began using hybrid-icing rules in the 2013–14 season, after several decades of using touch icing, following the career-ending injury of Joni Pitkänen where he crashed against the boards when competing for the icing call. The IIHF also switched to hybrid after the conclusion of the 2014 World Championship.

On June 13, 2017, USA Hockey adopted a rule change that eliminated the shorthanded icing exception. The rule change establishes that when a shorthanded team ices the puck a subsequent icing infraction will be enforced; play will stop and a face-off will occur in the offending team's zone. The rule change is effective starting with the 2017–18 regular season, impacting 14U and younger age groups.

Starting with the 2017–18 NHL season, offending teams are not allowed to take a timeout after an icing. In the 2019–20 NHL season a rule change allowed the offensive team to decide at which end zone dot they wished the face-off to be held following an icing (intended to grant a positional advantage to teams stronger on a certain side) and moved the location to the defending spot of the defending team during a delayed penalty.

Face-off location
	No penalty	Delayed penalty
Correct	defending spot of attacking team	neutral spot of attacking team (except NHL starting in 2019–20 season)
Correct	defending spot of attacking team	defending spot of defending team (NHL as of 2019–20 season)
Error	center spot (except USA Hockey)	defending spot of defending team
Error	defending spot of defending team (USA Hockey) (Note: Under USA Hockey Rules (Rule 624(c)), if the Officials shall have erred in calling an "icing the puck" infraction (regardless of whether either team is shorthanded) a face-off shall occur not at center ice, but at the end zone faceoff spot nearest to the location of the puck when play was stopped.)	defending spot of defending team

== See also ==
- Offside (ice hockey)

== Bibliography ==
- Duplacey, James (1996). The Rules of Hockey. Dan Diamond And Associates. ISBN 978-0920445440.
