= Bandy ball =

Ball used when playing bandy

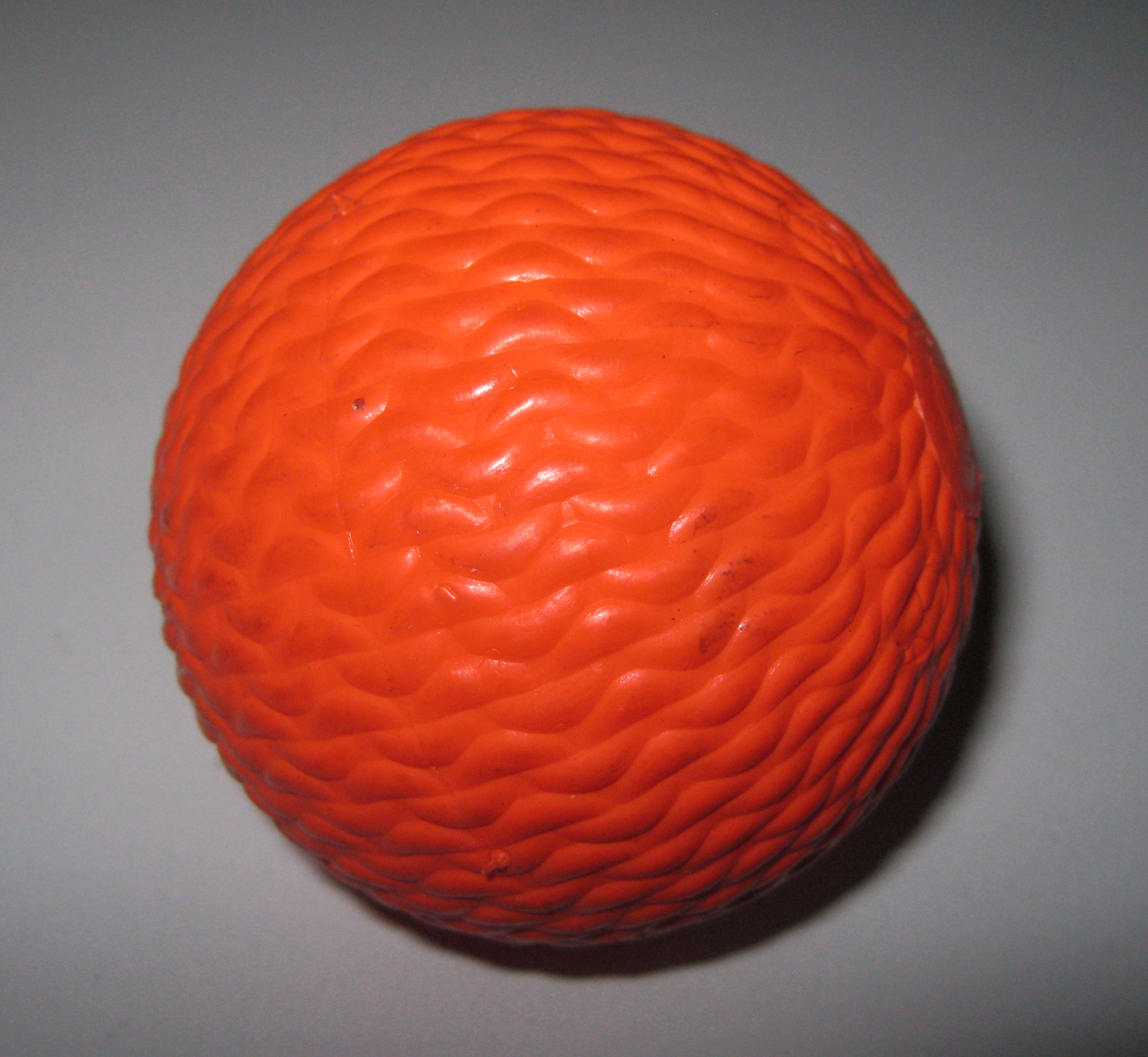
An orange bandy ball.

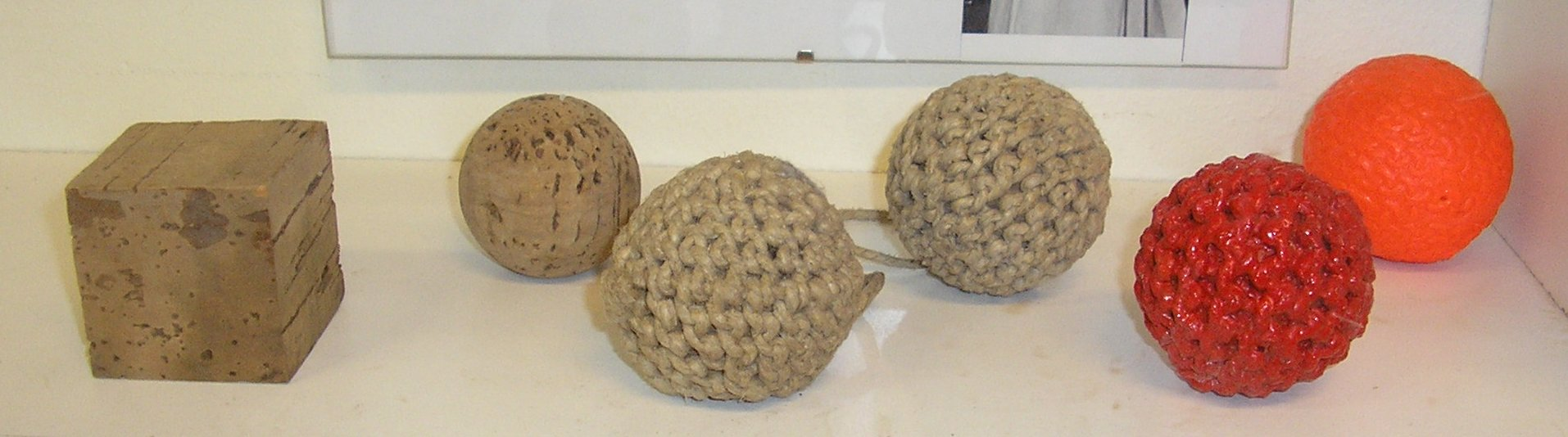
The making of a historic bandy ball, from the original cork on the left to the final ball painted red. To the far right is a modern bandy ball.

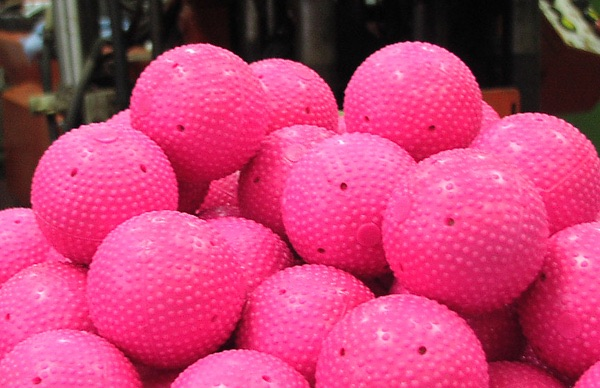
Bandy balls are often cerise coloured.

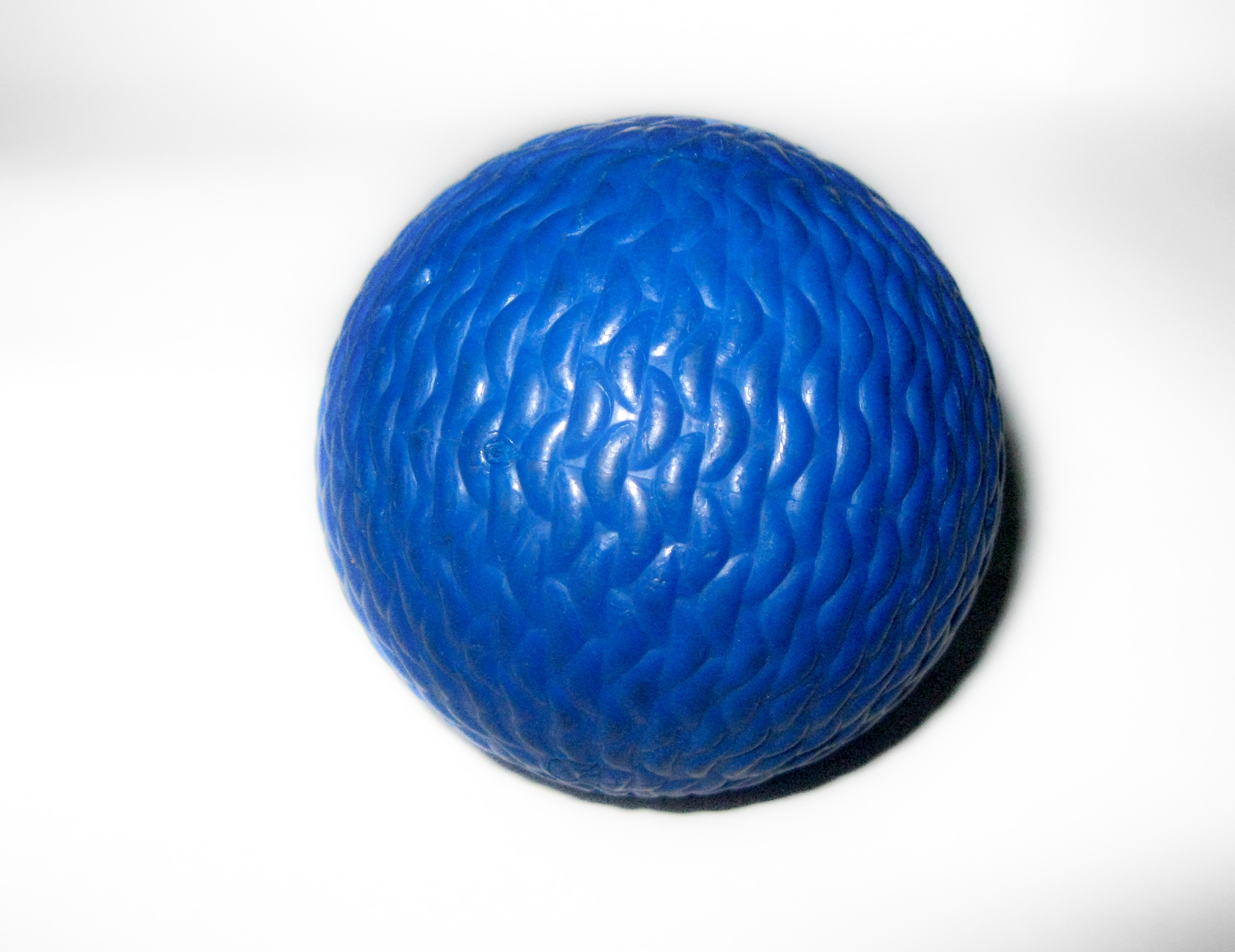
Ball used in the sport of rinkball. The ball color is blue.

A bandy ball is a rubber ball used for playing bandy and rink bandy. Bandy balls are manufactured by companies such as Jofa, Kosa, and Reebok.

The core of the ball is made of cork and is surrounded by rubber or rubber-like plastic. Balls should be manufactured in a diameter of 62.4 or 63.8 mm (2.46 or 2.51 in) (the latter is called a "Russian ball"). Originally, bandy balls were red, then later became orange or cerise. According to the Bandy Playing Rules set up by the Federation of International Bandy, any of these are allowed, but all balls used in one game must be of the same colour and type.

A similar ball is used in the sport of rinkball but the rinkball ball is blue in color rather than the orange or cerise color seen in both bandy and rink bandy.

Bandy was originally played with a wooden ice hockey puck-like object, though balls were also used. However, it was not until around 1904–1905 that the major breakthrough for the ball became a reality.

== See also ==
- Playing the ball in bandy
