= Ice hockey rink =

Rink for the purpose of playing ice hockey

Detailed diagram of an ice hockey rink

An ice hockey rink is an ice rink that is specifically designed for ice hockey, a competitive team sport. Alternatively it is used for other sports such as broomball, ringette, rinkball, and rink bandy. It is a rectangle with rounded corners and surrounded by walls approximately 1.22 metres (48 in) high called the boards. There are two standard rink sizes: North American and international.

== Name origins ==
Rink, a Scots word meaning 'course', was used as the name of a place where another game, curling, was played. Early in its history, ice hockey was played mostly on rinks constructed for curling. The name was retained after hockey-specific facilities were built.

== Dimensions ==
There are two standard sizes for hockey rinks: one used primarily in North America, also known as NHL size, the other used in Europe and international competitions, also known as IIHF or Olympic size.

=== International ===
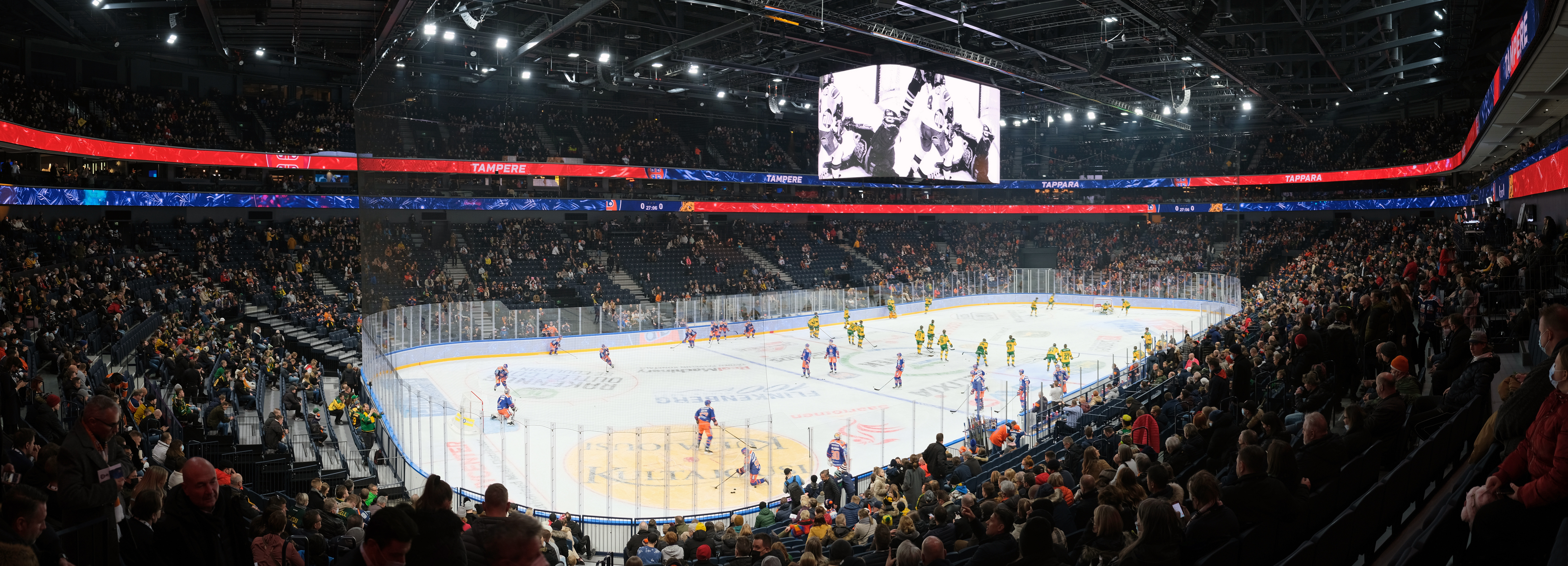
International standard ice hockey rink of Nokia Arena in Tampere, Finland

Internationally, the dimensions of ice hockey rinks follow International Ice Hockey Federation (IIHF) specifications of 60.0 metres (196.9 ft) in length, and 26.0 to 30.0 metres (85.3 to 98.4 ft) in width, with a corner radius of 7.0 to 8.5 metres (23.0 to 27.9 ft).

The goal lines must be 4.0 metres (13.1 ft) from the end boards and 5 centimetres (2.0 in) wide. The blue lines must be 15.0 metres (49.2 ft) (¼ of the total length of the rink) apart and 30 centimetres (11.8 in) wide. The red centre line must be 30 centimetres (11.8 in) wide, and is drawn across centre ice, parallel with the goal lines.

=== North American ===
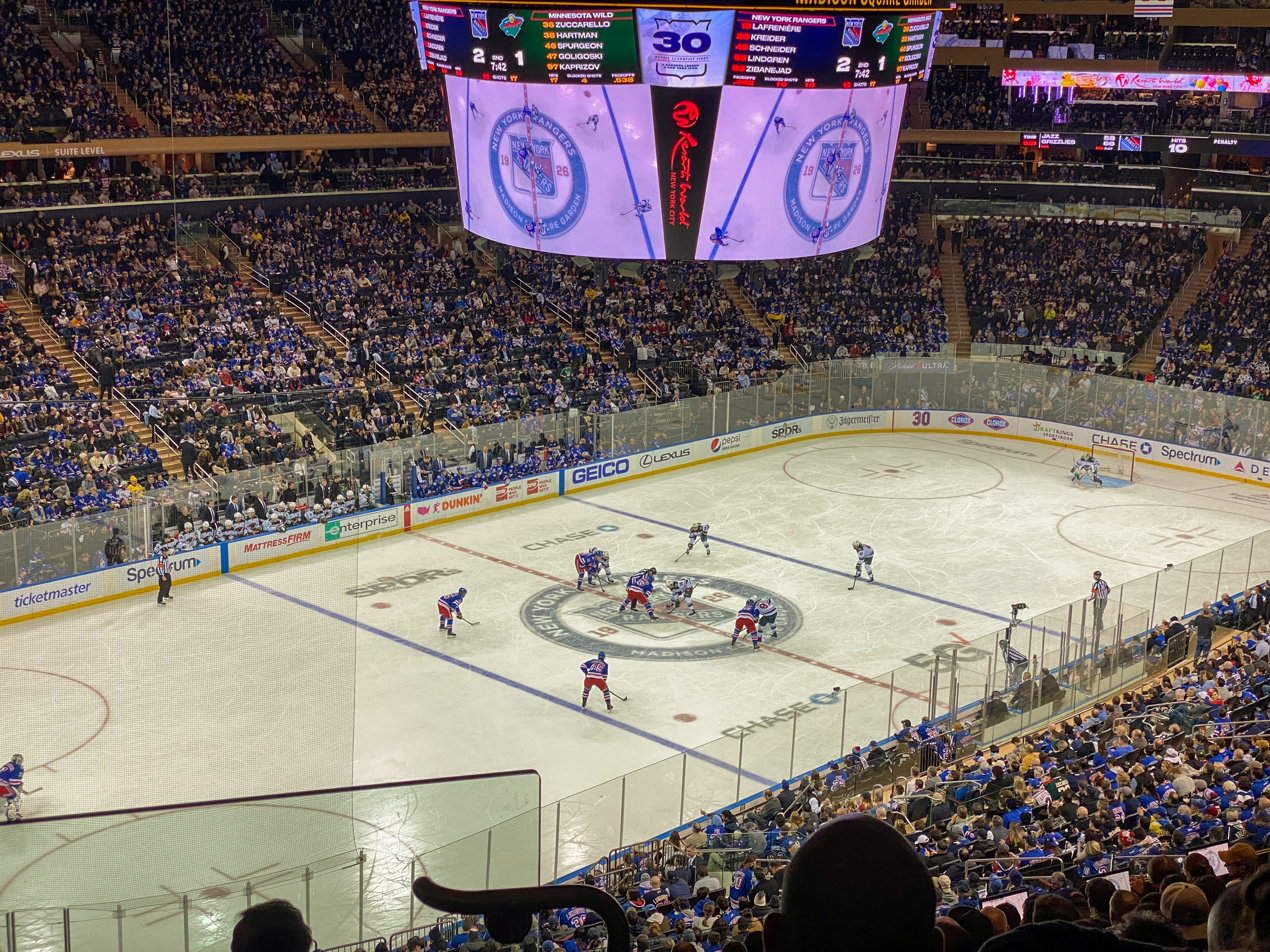
Madison Square Garden in New York City home to the National Hockey League's New York Rangers. Here, the Rangers (blue) and the Minnesota Wild (white) are seen preparing for a faceoff in a January 2022 game.

Most North American rinks follow the National Hockey League (NHL) specifications of 200 by 85 feet (61.0 by 25.9 m) with a corner radius of 28 feet (8.5 m). Each goal line is 11 feet (3.4 m) from the end boards. NHL blue lines are 75 feet (22.9 m) from the end boards and 50 feet (15.2 m) apart. The 13.4-foot (4.09 m) difference in width from the international standard represents a significant difference in width-to-length ratio on the ice.

=== Origins ===
The rink specifications originate from the ice surface of the Victoria Skating Rink in Montreal, constructed in 1862, where the first indoor game was played in 1875. Its ice surface measured 204 by 80 feet (62.2 m × 24.4 m). The curved corners are said to originate from the design of the Montreal Arena, constructed in 1898.

== Markings ==
A diagram of an NHL hockey rink showing the trapezoid behind the goal lines where goaltenders are permitted to handle the puck

=== Lines ===
The centre line divides the ice in half crosswise. It is used to judge icing. It is a thick line, and in the NHL must "contain regular interval markings of a uniform distinctive design, which will readily distinguish it from the two blue lines" (i.e. it must not be a solid single colour as the blue lines are). It may also be used to judge two-line pass violations in leagues that use such a rule.

There are two thick blue lines that divide the rink into three parts, called zones. The blue lines are used to judge if a player is offside. If an attacking player crosses the line into the other team's zone before the puck does, they are said to be offside.

Near each end of the rink, there is a thin red goal line spanning the width of the ice. It is used to judge goals and icing calls.

=== Faceoff spots and circles ===
There are 9 faceoff spots on a hockey rink. All faceoffs take place at these spots. There are two spots in each team's defensive zone, two at each end of the neutral zone, and one in the centre of the rink.

There are faceoff circles around the centre ice and end zone faceoff spots. There are hash marks painted on the ice near the end zone faceoff spots. The circles and hash marks show where players may legally position themselves during a faceoff or during in-game play.

==== Spot and circle dimensions ====
Both the centre faceoff spot and centre faceoff circle are blue. The circle is 30 feet (9m) in diameter, with an outline 2 inches (5.1 cm) thick, and the faceoff spot is a solid blue circle 12 inches (30 cm) in diameter.

All of the other faceoff spots and circles are colored red. Each spot consists of a circle 2 feet (61 cm) in diameter (as measured from the outermost edges) with an outline 2 inches (5.1 cm) thick. Within the spot, two red vertical lines are drawn 3 inches (7.6 cm) from the left and right inner edges, and the area between these lines is painted red while the rest of the circle is painted white.

=== Goal posts and nets ===
At each end of the ice, there is a goal consisting of a metal goal frame and cloth net in which each team must place the puck to score. According to NHL and IIHF rules, the entire puck must cross the entire goal line in order to be counted as a goal. Under NHL rules, the opening of the goal is 72 inches (180 cm) wide by 48 inches (120 cm) tall, and the footprint of the goal is 40 inches (100 cm) deep.

=== Crease ===
The crease is a special area of the ice in front of each goal that is designed to allow the goaltender to perform without interference.

In North American professional hockey, the goal crease consists of straight lines extending 4.5 feet (1.4 m) perpendicularly from the goal line 1 foot (30 cm) outside each goal post, connected by an arc with a 6-foot (1.8 m) radius; 5-inch-thick (13 cm) red hashmarks are added just inside the straight lines, 4 feet (120 cm) from the goal line and extending 5 inches (13 cm) into the crease from either side. The entire area of the crease is typically coloured blue for easier visibility.

=== Goaltender trapezoid ("Martin Brodeur" Rule) ===
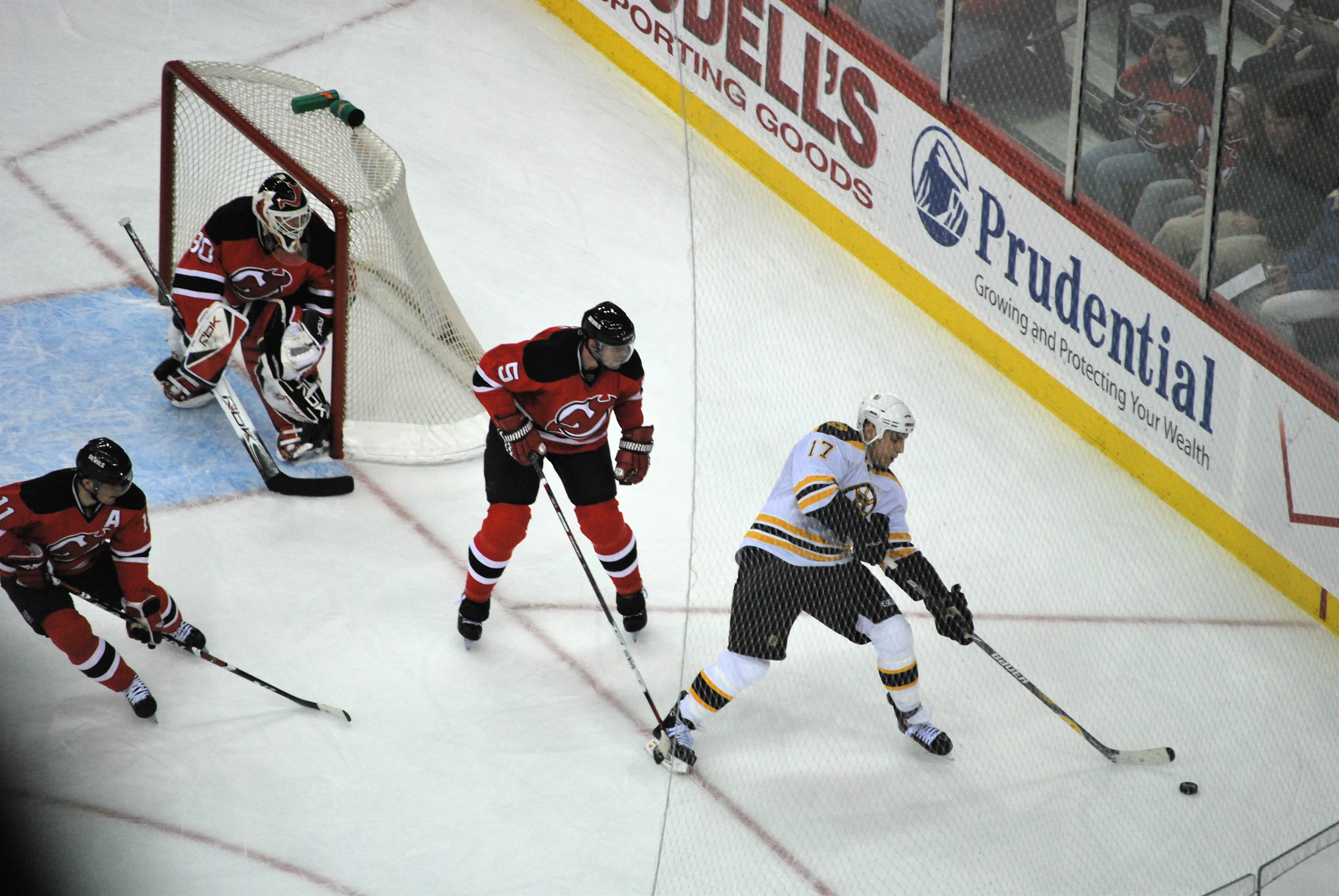
New Jersey Devils goaltender Martin Brodeur (top left) positions himself along the net during a 2008 game against the Boston Bruins. Goaltenders with good puck-handling abilities like Brodeur led to the trapezoidal zone behind the net to limit where the goaltender can legally play the puck behind the goal line

During the 2004–05 American Hockey League (AHL) season, an experimental rule was implemented for the first seven weeks of the season, instituting a goaltender trap zone, more commonly called the trapezoid in reference to its shape. Under the rule, it is prohibited for the goaltender to handle the puck anywhere behind the goal line that is not within the trapezoidal area. If they do so they are assessed a minor penalty for delay of game that is served by a teammate.

The motivation for the introduction of the trapezoid was to promote game flow and prolonged offensive attacks by making it more difficult for the goaltender to possess and clear the puck. The rule was aimed at reducing the effectiveness of goaltenders with good puck-handling abilities, such as former New Jersey Devils and St. Louis Blues goaltender Martin Brodeur, for whom the rule is nicknamed.

The area consists of a centred, symmetrical trapezoid. The bases of the trapezoid are formed by the goal line and the end boards. The base on the goal line measures 22 feet (6.7 m) — widened from the original 18 feet (5.5 m) for the 2014-15 NHL season onwards — and the base along the end boards measures 28 feet (8.5 m), with the depth behind the goal line-to-boards distance specified at 11 feet (3.4 m).

The seven-week experiment proved so successful that the AHL moved to enforce the rule for the rest of the season, and then the rule was approved by the NHL when play resumed for the 2005–06 season. The ECHL, the only other developmental league in the Professional Hockey Players Association along with the AHL, also approved the rule for 2005–06.

The trapezoid was later adopted by the KHL for the 2019–20 season, and by the IIHF in 2021.

=== Referee's crease ===
The referee's crease is a semicircle 10 feet (3.0 m) in radius in front of the scorekeepers bench. Under USA Hockey rule 601(d)(5), any player entering or remaining in the referee's crease while the referee is reporting to or consulting with any game official may be assessed a misconduct penalty. The USA Hockey casebook specifically states that the imposition of such a penalty would be unusual, and the player would typically first be asked to leave the referee's crease before the imposition of the penalty. The NHL has a similar rule, also calling for a misconduct penalty. Traditionally, captains and alternate captains are the only players allowed to approach the referee's crease.

== Zones ==
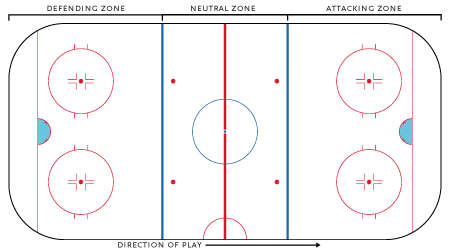
Zones on a hockey rink

The blue lines divide the rink into three zones. The central zone is called the neutral zone or simply centre ice. The generic term for the outer zones is end zones, but they are more commonly referred to by terms relative to each team. The end zone in which a team is trying to score is called the attacking zone or offensive zone; the end zone in which the team's own goal net is located is called the defending zone or defensive zone.

The blue line is considered part of whichever zone the puck is in. Therefore, if the puck is in the neutral zone, the blue line is part of the neutral zone. It must completely cross the blue line to be considered in the end zone. Once the puck is in the end zone, the blue line becomes part of that end zone. The puck must now completely cross the blue line in the other direction to be considered in the neutral zone again.

== Boards ==
In a hockey rink, the boards are the low wall that form the boundaries of the rink. They are between 40 and 48 inches (100 and 120 cm) high. The "side boards" are the boards along the two long sides of the rink. The half boards are the boards halfway between the goal line and blue line. The sections of the rink located behind each goal are called the "end boards". The boards that are curved (near the ends of the rink) are called the "corner boards".

== See also ==
- National Hockey League rules
- Ice rink
- Figure skating rink
- Speed skating rink
