= Playing period =

Playing period is a division of time in a sports or games, in which play occurs. Many games are divided into a fixed number of periods, which may be named for the number of divisions. Other games use terminology independent of the total number of divisions. A playing period may have a fixed length of game time or be bound by other rules of the game.

== Description ==
The playing period is a division of time in a sports or games, in which play occurs. Many games are divided into a fixed number of periods, which may be named for the number of divisions (e.g., a half or a quarter). Other games use terminology independent of the total number of divisions (e.g., sets or innings). A playing period may have a fixed length of game time or be bound by other rules (e.g., three outs in baseball or a sudden-death goal in overtime).

== Common periods ==
=== Halves and quarters ===
Basketball and gridiron football are among the sports that are divided into two halves, which may be subdivided into two quarters. A fifth overtime "quarter" may be played in the event of a tie at the end of the fourth quarter.

=== Periods ===
Floorball and ice hockey games are typically divided into three periods. A fourth period of overtime may be played in the event of a tie at the end of the third period.

=== Innings ===
Cricket and baseball games are divided into innings; within each of the innings, there are further subdivisions of play known as deliveries or pitches. In limited overs cricket, each of the innings lasts until either all but one of the players on the batting team are out, or a certain number of legal deliveries have occurred. Additional short innings, which are also limited in the number of legal deliveries, are played if necessary to break ties. In baseball, each inning consists of each team batting until three players on the team are out. Additional innings may be played if the game is tied after the ninth or subsequent innings.

In variations of tag such as kho-kho and atya-patya, there is a time limit for each inning, and if the game is tied, additional innings may be played on a basis akin to sudden death.

=== Ends ===
Curling contests consist of a number of ends, where each player on each team throws all of their stones.

=== Sets ===
Some sports, like volleyball or tennis are divided into a predetermined number of "sets", and the match ends when a team or individual wins the required number of sets (e.g. winning 3 sets in a best of 5). A set is usually won when a number of points is achieved by one of the competitors (25 points in volleyball or 6 games in tennis, for example), though further rules, like having a 2 points advantage, might be imposed.

== See also ==
- Sports
- Game
