= Bandy Playing Rules =

Rule book for the winter team sport of bandy

Bandy Playing Rules is the name of the rule book for bandy, edited by the Federation of International Bandy. The rule book is available online. The current book was adopted in September 2013.

The rule book and the rules are overseen by the Rules and Referee Committee.

== History ==
The first rules for bandy was developed and written down in the late 19th century in England, by Charles Goodman Tebbutt, and later on in Russia. The two rule books had some differences but were similar enough that the game can be seen as being the same. At the time, the rules of ice hockey were also more similar with the bandy rules than they are today. The English rules of bandy were adopted in Sweden, Finland and Norway, where bandy survived while it died out in England and continental Europe in the early 20th century. In the 1930s, Sweden, Finland and Norway started to cooperate on the development of the rules, so they would be the same in all three countries. The demonstration of bandy at the 1952 Winter Olympics made Soviet Union interested in joining the international exchange and the three Nordic countries were invited to a friendly tournament 1954 in Moscow. By 1955 the four countries had agreed upon a common set of rules and International Bandy Federation was created, which since then has been the governing body for the sport, although it changed its name to Federation of International Bandy in the first decade of the 3rd millennium. From the English rules, the weight of the ball, the shape of the stick and goalcage, the ban on playing with the feet, as well as the goalkeeper playing without a stick, prevailed, while the 15 cm (5.9 in) high border along the sidelines, and the offside rule, were kept from the Soviet rule book.
