= Big Dog =

Big Dog can refer to:

== Entertainment ==
- Big Dog, a band composed of members of the band Black Grape
- Big Dog (album), a 1996 album by Seven Nation
- "Big Dog", a song from the album Red by the band Guillemots
- "Big Dog", a song by Akon from the soundtrack of The Shaggy Dog
- The Big Dog, a character in the American animated TV series 2 Stupid Dogs
- The Big Dog (film), a 2022 Australian film
- Big Dog Productions, Jay Leno's production company
- Big Dog, mascot and character created of Australia television station, NBN

== Radio stations ==
Radio stations branded as "Big Dog" or "The Big Dog":

- CHBD-FM
- CILB-FM
- CKTO-FM
- KIOC
- KVVP ("Big Dog Country")
- KXDG
- KYNU
- WDMG-FM
- WQHL (AM)
- WVNA-FM

== People ==
- Stephen Arthurworrey (born 1994), English footballer
- Chris Ciriello (born 1985), Australian field hockey player
- Bill Clinton (born 1946), 42nd president of the United States
- Steve Duemig (1954–2019), American radio sports talk show host
- Leon Gray (1951–2001), American football player
- Victor Hobson (born 1980), American football player
- Larry Huras (born 1955), Canadian hockey player
- Isaiah Johnson (basketball) (born 1994), American basketball player
- Dan Ladouceur (born 1973), Canadian lacrosse player
- Ernie Nevers (1902–1976), American football and baseball player and college football head coach, member of the Pro and College Football Halls of Fame
- Michael Pedersen (born 1986), Danish cricketer
- Tony Pérez (born 1942), Cuban-American baseball player
- Roman Reigns (born 1985), American professional wrestler
- Bryan Robinson (American football, born 1974) (1974–2016), American football player
- Glenn Robinson (born 1973), American basketball player
- Adam Smith-Neale (born 1993), English professional darts player
- Truman Spain (1913–1968), American football player
- Roy "Big Dog" Thirlwall, a former member of the band Len
- Tom Wiesner (1939–2002), American politician and businessman

== Places ==
- Great Dog Island (Tasmania), also known as Big Dog Island
- Big Dog Mountain, part of the Shulaps Range, British Columbia, Canada
- Big Dog Forest, County Fermanagh - see List of parks in Northern Ireland
- Big Dog Canyon, in New Mexico on the western border of the Guadalupe Mountains

== Other ==
- A large dog, dog type, or dog breed
- BigDog, a quadruped robot made by Boston Dynamics
- Big Dog Motorcycles, an American motorcycle company
- "Big Dog", the ZR2 concept model of the Chevrolet Corvette (C4) car
- Haval Big Dog, an automobile
- Big Dog (company), an American clothing brand
- Big dog, a non standard poker hand

== See also ==
- Big Dogz, a 2011 album by the Scottish rock band Nazareth
- "Big Dawgs", a 2024 single by Indian musicians Hanumankind and Kalmi
- Magnus Hundt or Magnus Canis (Latin for "big dog") (1449–1519), German philosopher, physician and theologian
- Carlos Eduardo (fighter) (born 1981), Brazilian mixed martial artist nicknamed Cachorrão (Portuguese for "big dog")
- Gustavo Kuerten (born 1976), Brazilian retired tennis player nicknamed Cachorro Grande (Portuguese for "big dog")
- Cachorro Grande (Portuguese for "big dog"), Brazilian rock band
- Esporte Clube São Bernardo, Brazilian football club nicknamed Cachorrão (Portuguese for "big dog")
- Little Dog (disambiguation)
