= Ice rink =

Place for ice skating and sports

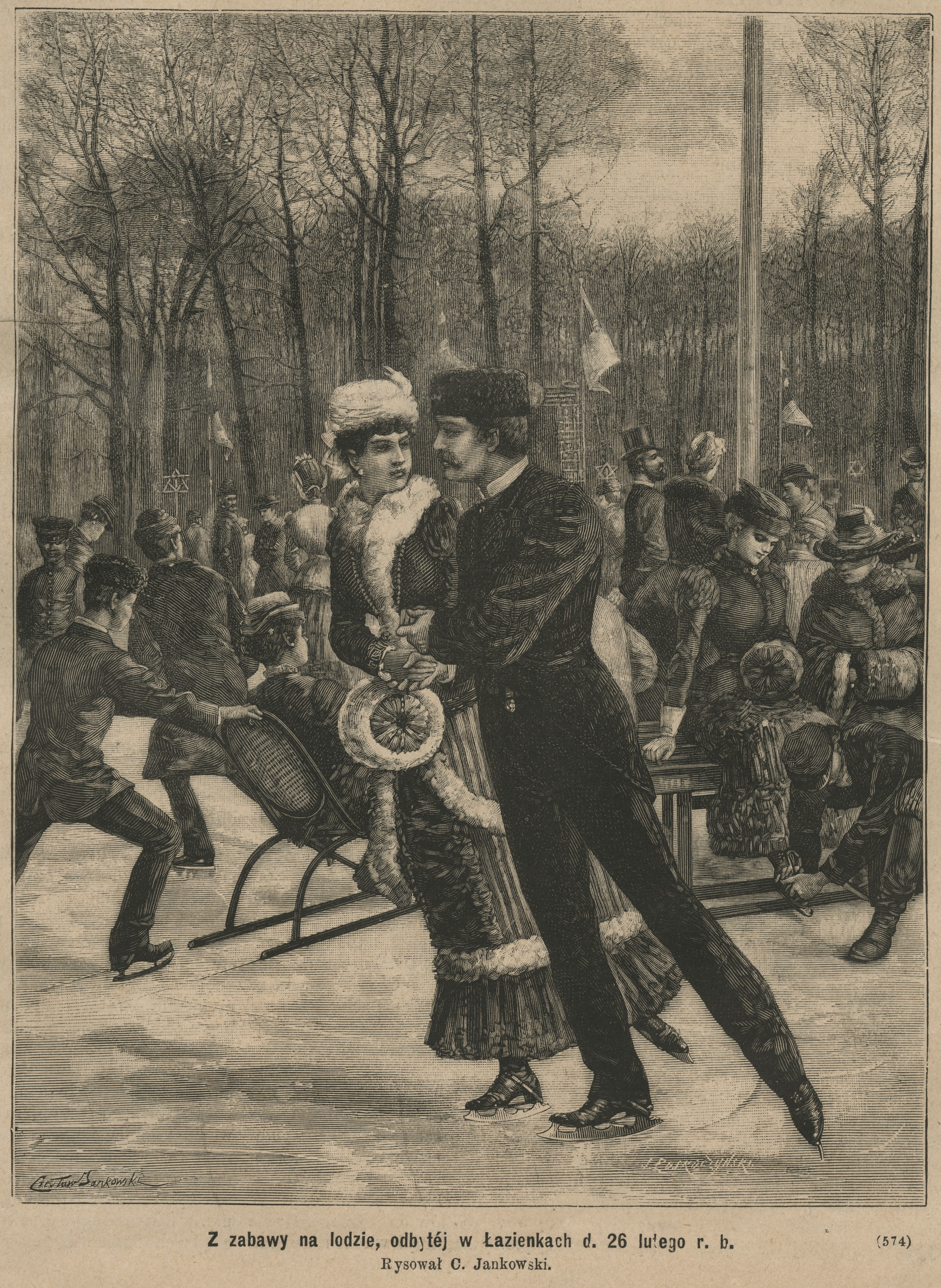
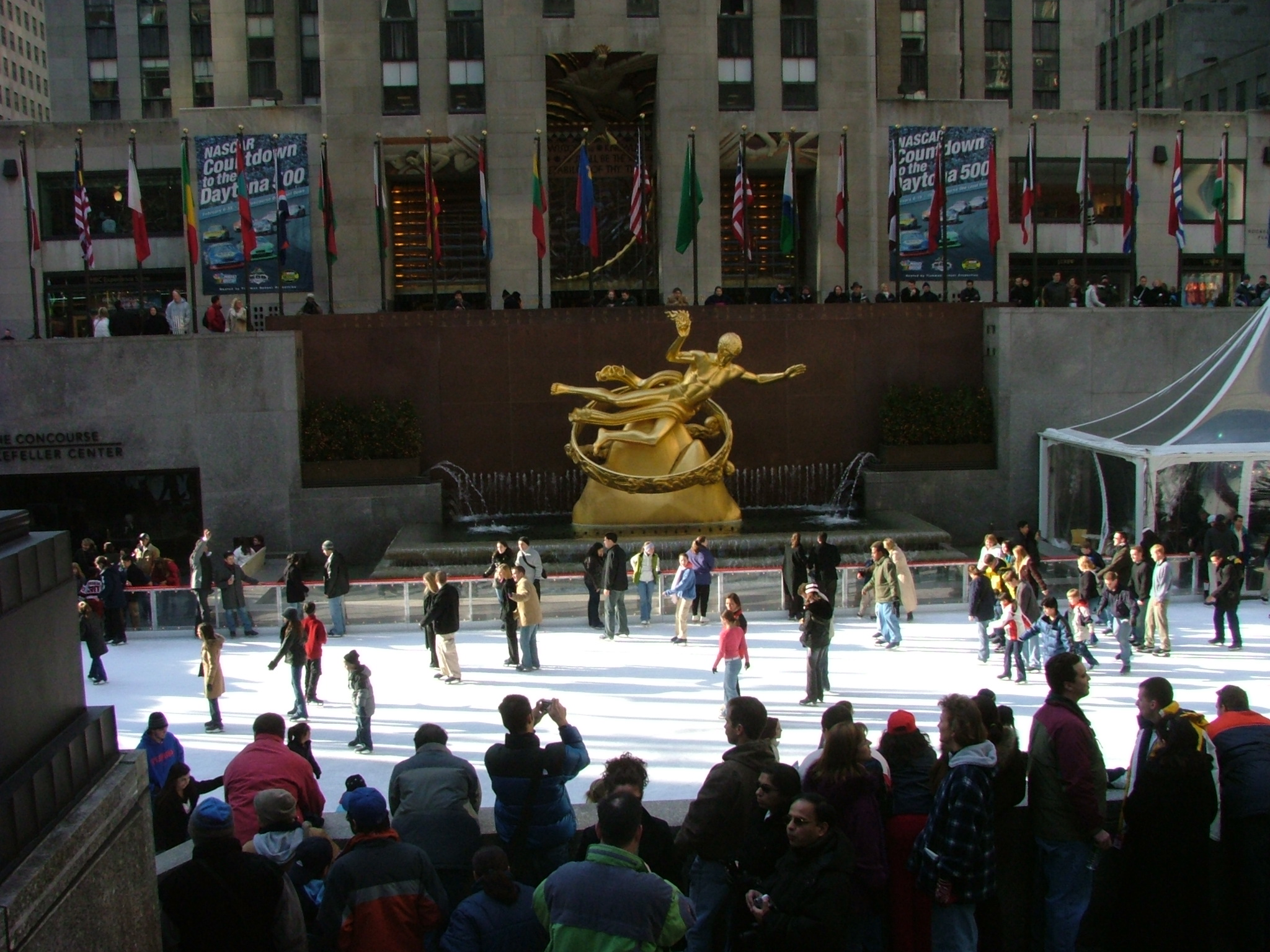
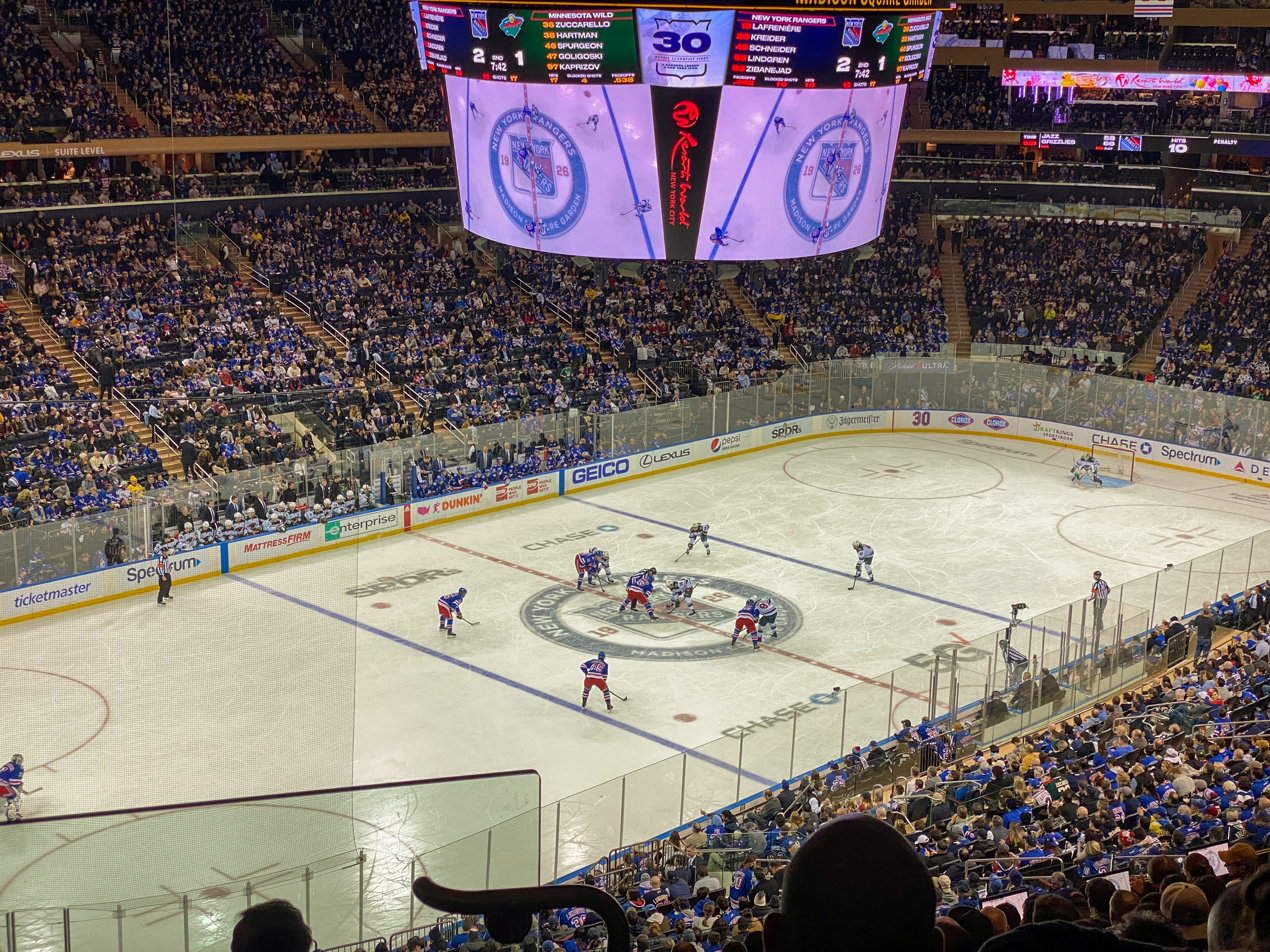
Ice skating party in Warsaw in the 1880s; Rockefeller Center rink in New York City; Ice hockey at Madison Square Garden in New York City

An ice rink (or ice skating rink) is a frozen body of water or an artificial sheet of ice where people can ice skate or play winter sports. Rinks are also used for exhibitions, contests and ice shows. The growth and increasing popularity of skating during the 1800s marked a rise in the deliberate construction of rinks in numerous areas of the world.

The word "rink" is a word of Scottish origin meaning "course", used to describe the ice surface used in the sport of curling, but was kept in use once the winter team sport of ice hockey became established.

There are two types of rinks in prevalent use today: natural ice rinks, where freezing occurs from cold ambient temperatures, and artificial ice rinks (or mechanically frozen), where a coolant produces cold temperatures underneath the water body (on which the game is played), causing the water body to freeze and then stay frozen. There are also synthetic ice rinks where skating surfaces are made out of plastics.

Besides recreational skating, some of its uses include: hockey, sledge hockey (a.k.a. "Para ice hockey", or "sled hockey"), spongee (a.k.a. sponge hockey), bandy, rink bandy, rinkball, ringette, broomball (both indoor and outdoor versions), Moscow broomball, speed skating, figure skating, ice stock sport, curling, and crokicurl. However, Moscow broomball is typically played on a tarmac tennis court that has been flooded with water and allowed to freeze. The sports of broomball, curling, ice stock sport, spongee, Moscow broomball, and the game of crokicurl, do not use skates of any kind.

While technically not an rink, ice tracks and trails, such as those used in the sport of speed skating and recreational or pleasure skating are sometimes referred to as "ice rinks".

== Etymology ==
Rink, a Scottish word meaning 'course', was used as the name of a place where curling was played. As curling is played on ice, the name has been retained for the construction of ice areas for other sports and uses.

== History ==
=== Great Britain ===
==== London, England ====
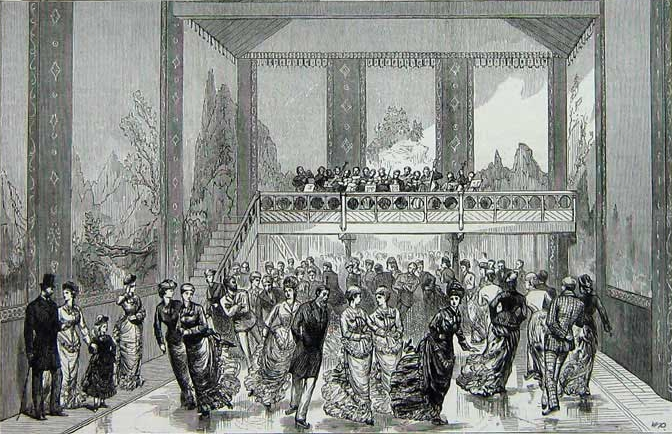
Interior of the Glaciarium in 1876

Early attempts in the construction of artificial ice rinks were first made in the 'rink mania' of 1841–44. The technology for the maintenance of natural ice did not exist, therefore these early rinks used a substitute consisting of a mixture of hog's lard and various salts. An item in the May 8, 1844, issue of Eliakim Littell's Living Age headed "The Glaciarium" reported that, "This establishment, which has been removed to Grafton street East' Tottenham Court Road, was opened on Monday afternoon. The area of artificial ice is extremely convenient for such as may be desirous of engaging in the graceful and manly pastime of skating".

By 1844, these venues fell out of fashion as customers grew tired of the 'smelly' ice substitute. It wasn't until 30 years later that refrigeration technology developed to the point where natural ice could finally be feasibly used in the rink. The world's first mechanically frozen ice rink was the Glaciarium, opened by John Gamgee, a British veterinarian and inventor, in a tent in a small building just off the Kings Road in Chelsea, London, on January 7, 1876. Gamgee had become fascinated by the refrigeration technology he encountered during a study trip to America to look at Texas fever in cattle. In March of that same year it moved to a permanent venue at 379 Kings Road, where a rink measuring 12.2 by 7.3 metres (40 by 24 ft) was established.

The rink was based on a concrete surface, with layers of earth, cow hair and timber planks. Atop these were laid oval copper pipes carrying a solution of glycerine with ether, nitrogen peroxide and water. The pipes were covered by water and the solution was pumped through, freezing the water into ice. Gamgee discovered the process while attempting to develop a method to freeze meat for import from Australia and New Zealand, and patented it as early as 1870.

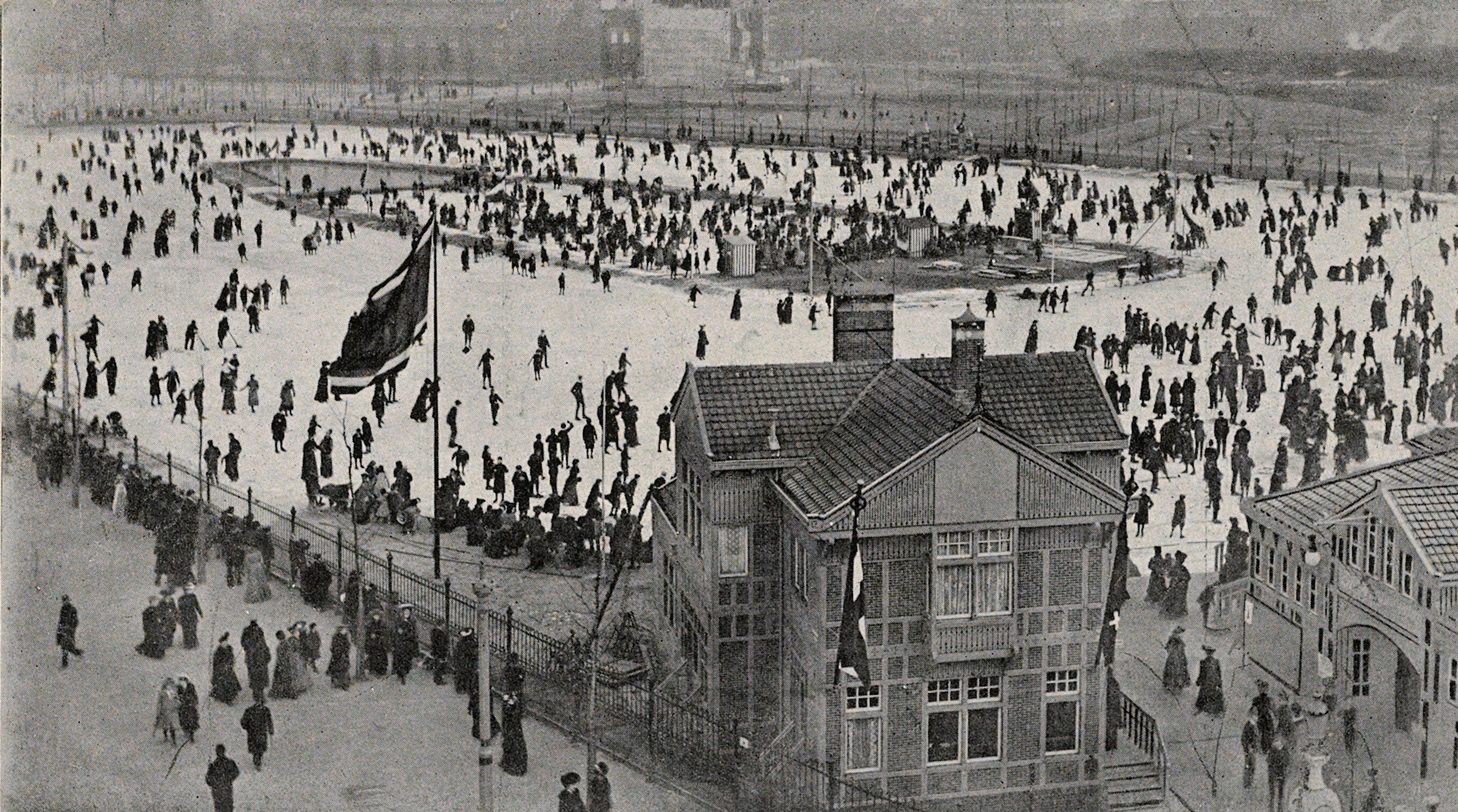
Ice rink in Amsterdam c. 1900, from the Amsterdam City Archives

Gamgee operated the rink on a membership-only basis and attempted to attract a wealthy clientele, experienced in open-air skating during winters in the Alps. He installed an orchestra gallery, which could also be used by spectators, and decorated the walls with views of the Swiss Alps.

The rink initially proved a success, and Gamgee opened two further rinks later in the year: at Rusholme in Manchester and the "Floating Glaciarium" at Charing Cross in London, this last significantly larger at 35.1 by 7.6 metres (115 by 25 ft). The Southport Glaciarium opened in 1879, using Gamgee's method.

==== The Fens, England ====
In the marshlands of The Fens, skating was developed early as a pastime during winter where there were plenty of natural ice surfaces. This is the origin of the Fen skating and is said to be the birthplace of bandy. The Great Britain Bandy Association has its home in the area.

=== Hungary ===
In Austria-Hungary, the first artificial ice skating rink opened in 1870 in The City Park of Budapest, which is still in operation to this day and is considered one of the largest in Europe.

=== Germany ===
In Germany, the first skating rink opened in 1882 in Frankfurt during a patent exhibition. It covered 520 m^{2} (5,600 ft^{2}) and operated for two months; the refrigeration system was designed by Jahre Linde, and was probably the first skating rink where ammonia was used as a refrigerant. Ten years later, a larger rink was permanently installed on the same site.

=== Early indoor rinks ===
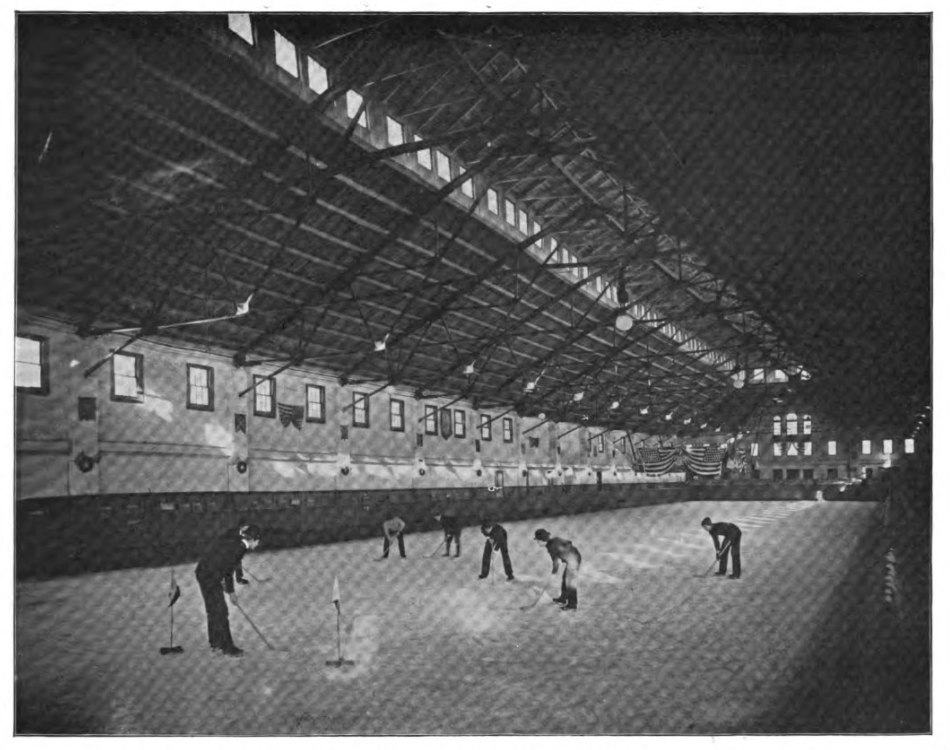
1894–1895: North Avenue Ice Palace skating rink in Baltimore, Maryland

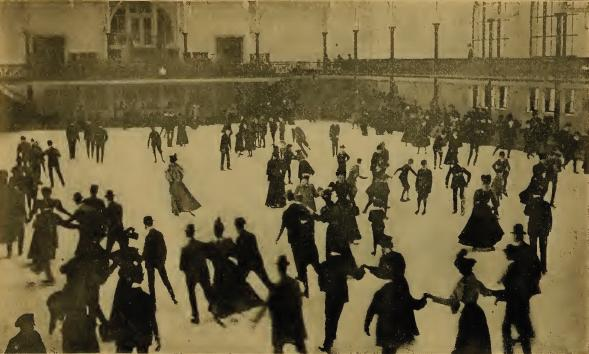
1901: St. Nicholas Rink, New York City

Skating quickly became a favorite pastime and craze in several American cities around the mid 1800s spawning a construction period of several rinks.

Two early indoor rinks made of mechanically frozen ice in the United States opened in 1894, the North Avenue Ice Palace in Baltimore, Maryland, and the Ice Palace in New York City.

The St. Nicholas Rink, (a.k.a. "St. Nicholas Arena"), was an indoor rink in New York City which existed from 1896 until its demolition in the 1980s. It was one of the earliest American indoor rinks made of mechanically frozen ice in North America and gave skaters the opportunity to enjoy an extended skating season. The rink was used for pleasure skating, ice hockey, and ice skating, and was an important rink involved in the development of the sports of hockey and boxing in the United States.

==== Oldest indoor artificial ice rink in use ====
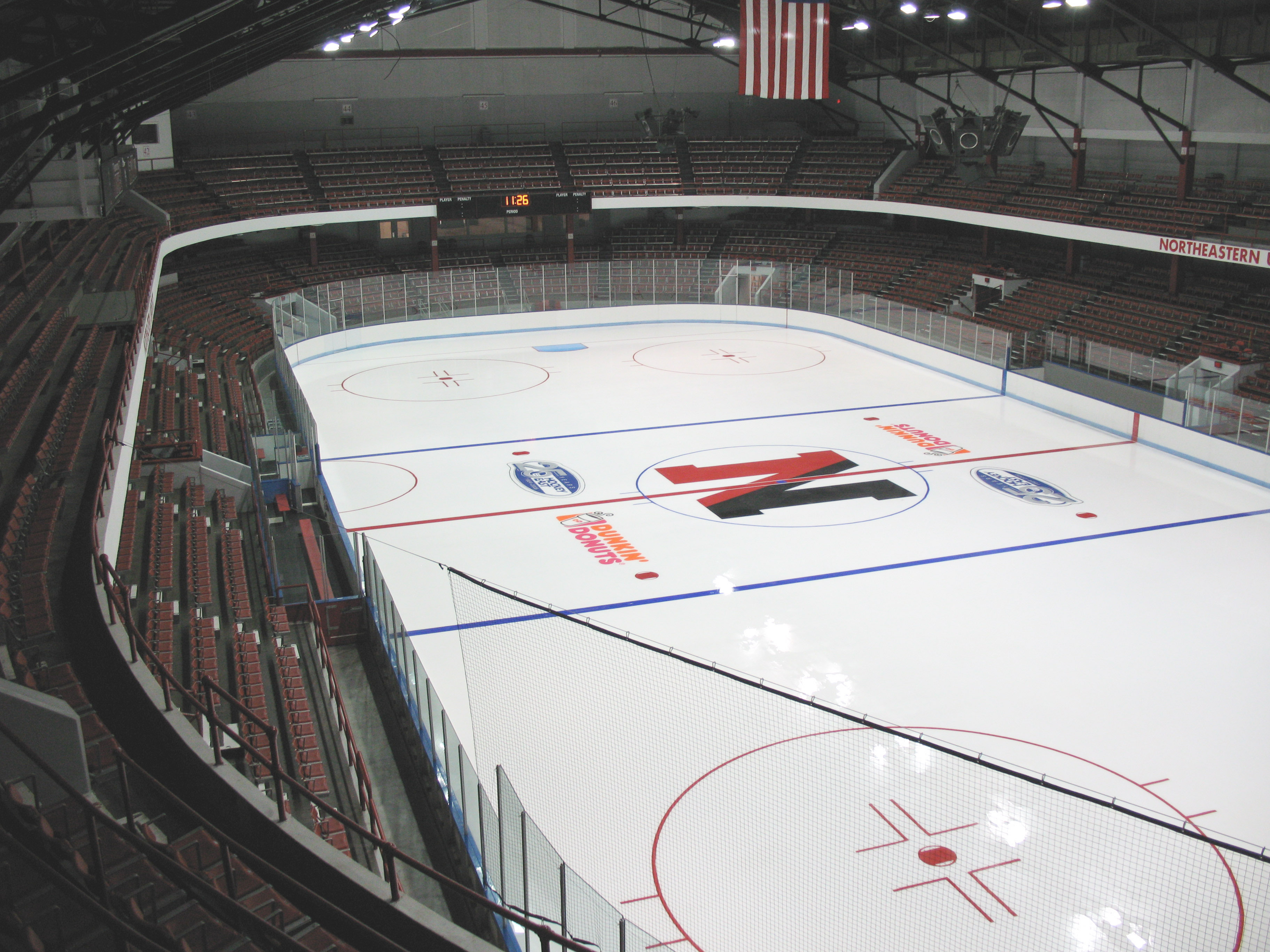
2009: Matthews Arena (formerly Boston Arena) in Boston, Massachusetts

Until December 2025, the oldest indoor artificial ice rink still in use in the United States was Boston, Massachusetts's Matthews Arena (formerly Boston Arena), which was built between 1909 and 1910. The rink is located on the campus of Northeastern University. The rink saw its last game in December 2025, and will be completely removed by April 2026.

This American rink is the original home of the National Hockey League (NHL) Boston Bruins. The Bruins are the only remaining NHL team who are members of the NHL's Original Six with their original home arena still in existence. The Calumet Colosseum in Calumet, Michigan, which was built in 1913, is the oldest indoor ice arena in North America and is considered the oldest purpose-built hockey rink in the United States.

==== Contemporary ====
The Guidant John Rose Minnesota Oval is an outdoor rink in Roseville, Minnesota, that is large enough to allow skaters to play the sport of bandy. Its perimeter is used as an oval speed skating track. The facility was constructed between June and December 1993. It is the only regulation-sized bandy field in North America and serves as the home of USA Bandy and its national bandy teams. The $3.9 million renovation project planned for the Guidant John Rose Minnesota Oval was set to be completed before the opening of the rink's 29th season on November 18, 2022.

The oval measures at 400 meters long and 200 meters wide, which makes it the largest artificial outdoor refrigerated sheet of ice in North America. It is a world-class facility that is primarily used for ice sports such as skating, hockey, speed skating, and bandy. The oval hosts several national and international competitions throughout the year, including the USA Cup in bandy.

=== Canada ===
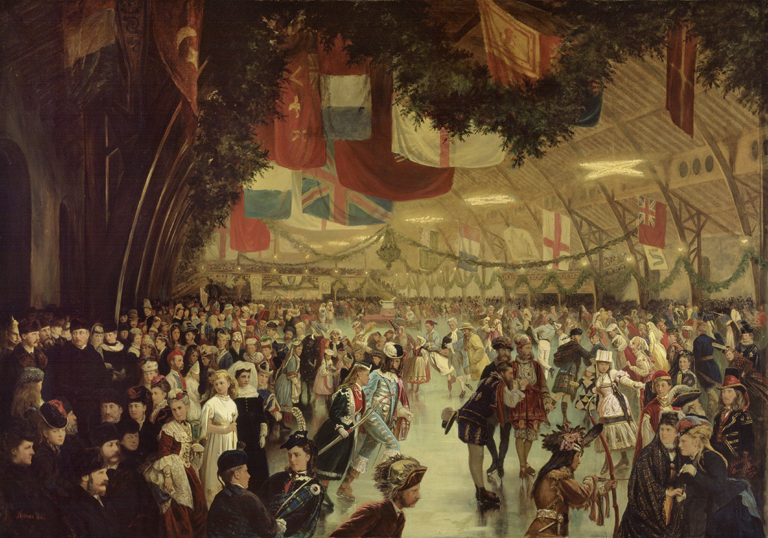
Painting by William Notman of a skating carnival at the Victoria Skating Rink in Montreal

The first building in Canada to be electrified was the Victoria Skating Rink which opened in 1862 in Montreal. The rink was created using natural ice. At the start of the twentieth century, it had been described as "one of the finest covered rinks in the world" and was used during winter for pleasure skating, hockey, and skating sports. In summer months, the building was used for various other events.

The Denman Arena (1911) was the first indoor rink in Canada to use artificial ice. Located in Vancouver, it was the primary site for the Pacific Coast Hockey Association professional hockey league. It was destroyed by fire in 1936. The National Hockey Association (NHA) got its first artificial ice rink arena in 1912 with the opening of the Mutual Street Arena in Toronto. It was demolished in 1989.

Two of the oldest buildings formerly used for indoor rinks are still standing: the Stannus Street Rink (1897) in Windsor, Nova Scotia, and the Aberdeen Pavilion (1898) in Ottawa. The Aberdeen Pavilion is the oldest building still standing that has been used for Stanley Cup games.

== Types ==
=== Natural ice ===
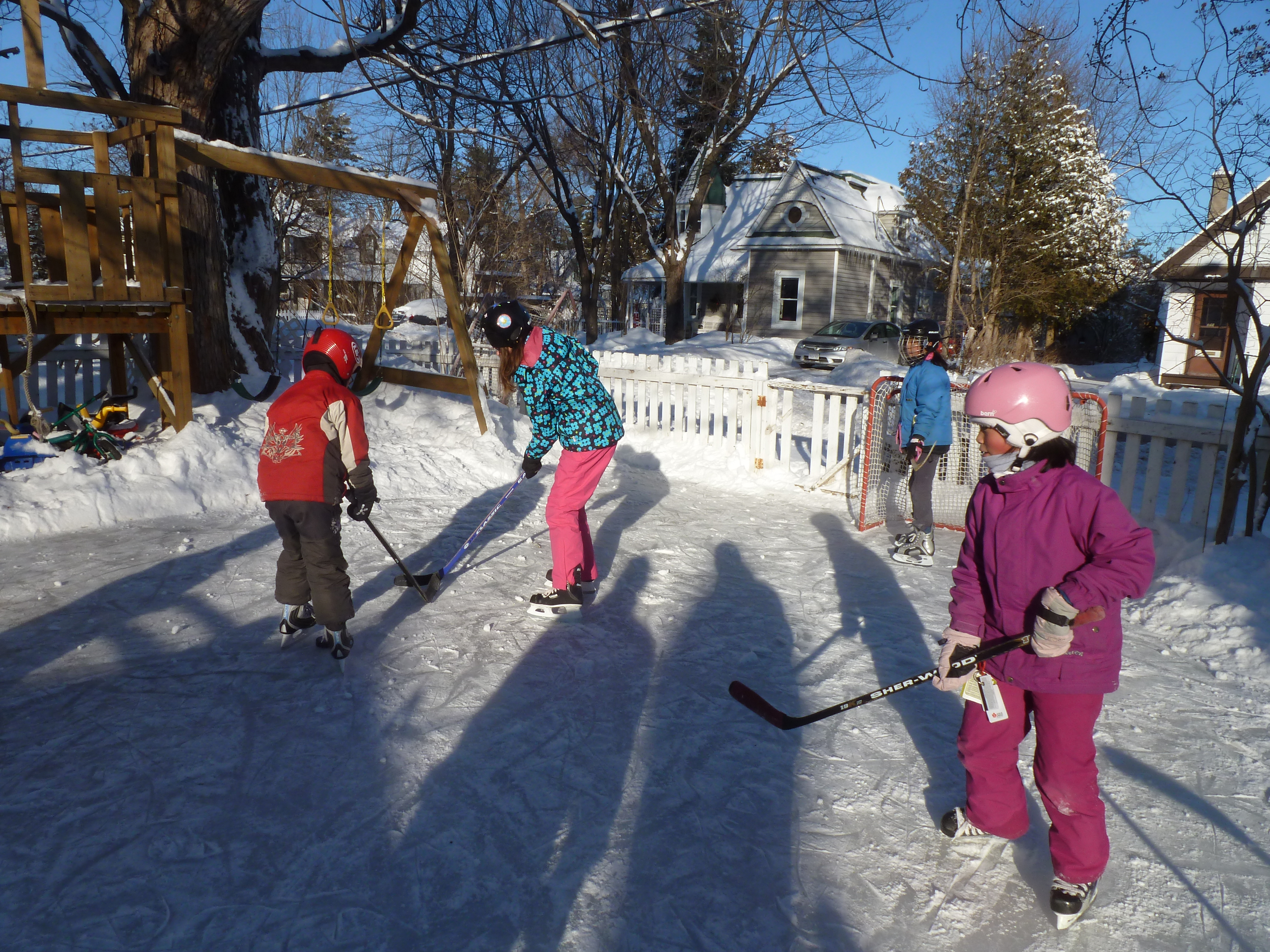
Children playing hockey on a backyard rink in Canada

Many rinks consist of, or are found on, open bodies of water such as lakes, ponds, canals, and sometimes rivers; these can be used only in the winter in climates where the surface freezes thickly enough to support human weight. Rinks can also be made in cold climates by enclosing a level area of ground, filling it with water, and letting it freeze. Snow may be packed to use as a containment material.

An example of this type of "rink", which is a body of water converted into a skating trail during winter, is the Rideau Canal Skateway in Ottawa, Ontario.

=== Artificial ice ===
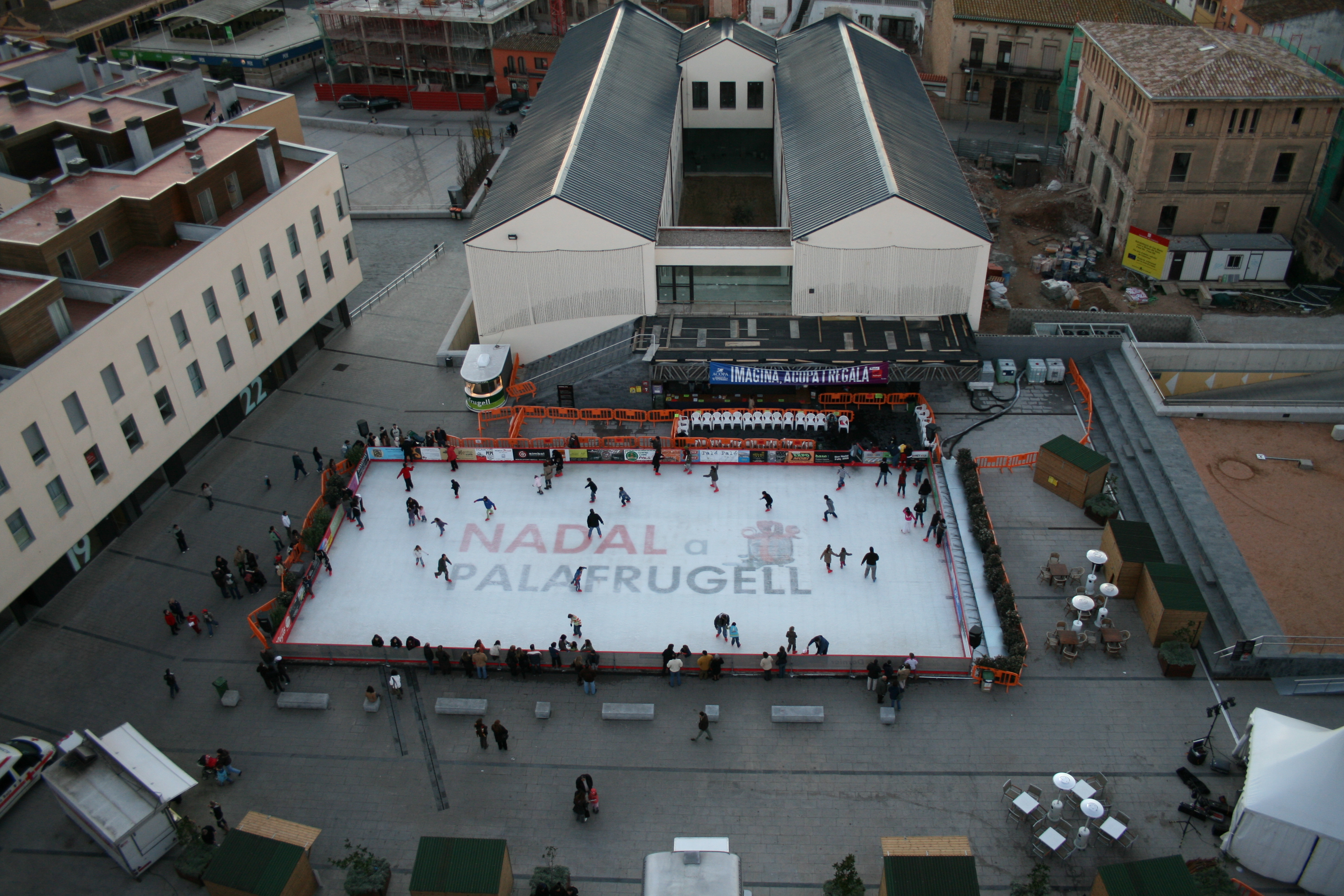
A typical mobile rink near the Spanish Costa Brava

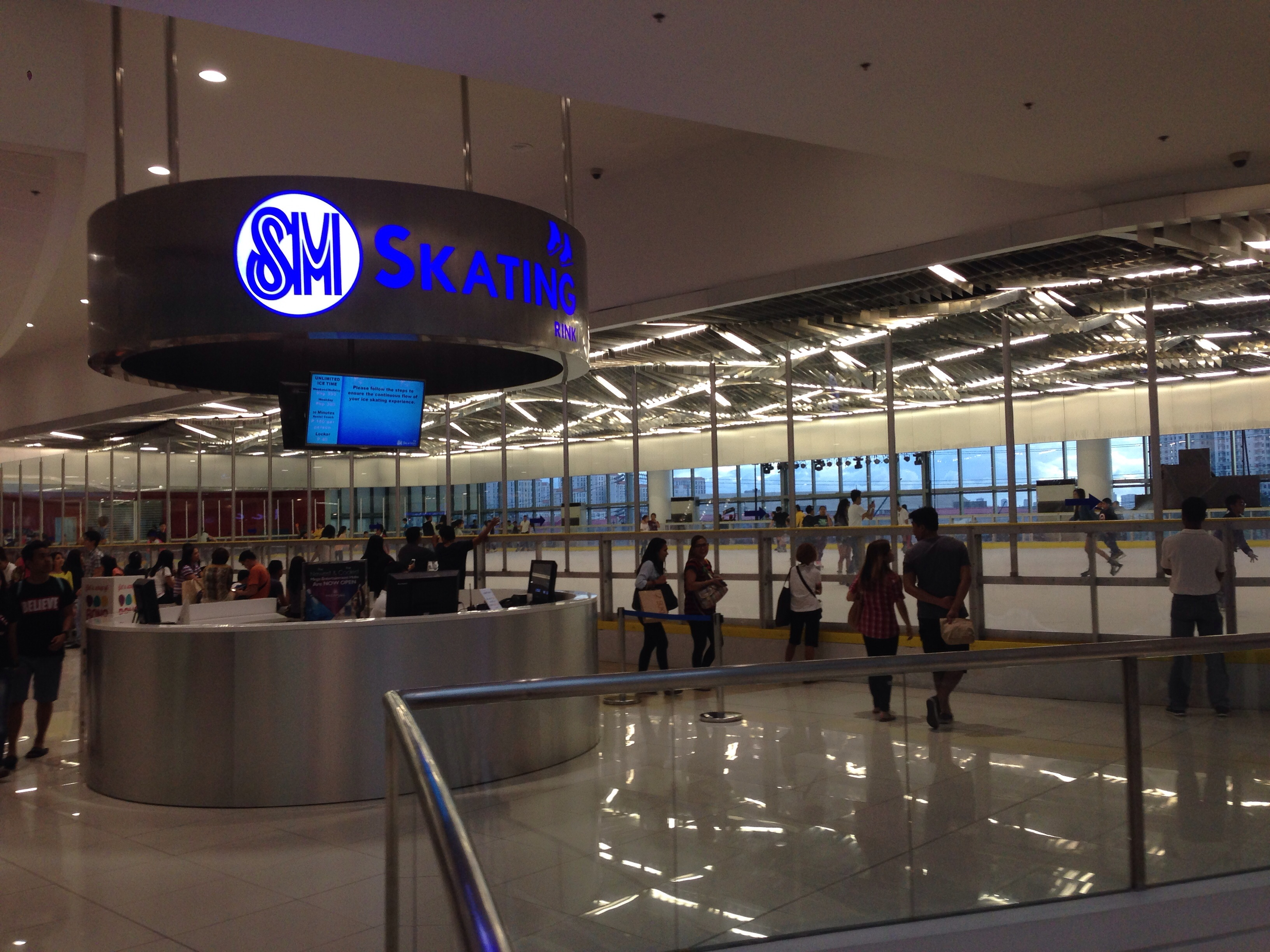
SM Skating Rink at Metro Manila's Megamall located in Ortigas

In any climate, an arena ice surface can be installed in a properly built space. This consists of a bed of sand or occasionally a slab of concrete, through (or on top of) which pipes run. The pipes carry a chilled fluid (usually either a salt brine or water with antifreeze, or in the case of smaller rinks, refrigerant) which can lower the temperature of the slab so that water placed atop will freeze. This method is known as 'artificial ice' to differentiate from rinks made by simply freezing water in a cold climate, indoors or outdoors, although both types are of frozen water. A more proper technical term is 'mechanically frozen' ice.

An example of this type of rink is the outdoor rink at Rockefeller Center in New York.

==== Construction ====
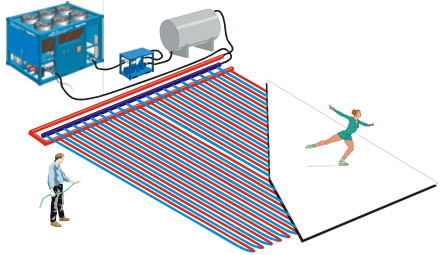
Main components of a rink

Modern rinks have a specific procedure for preparing the surface. With the pipes cold, a thin layer of water is sprayed on the sand or concrete to seal and level it (or in the case of concrete, to keep it from being marked). This thin layer is painted white or pale blue for better contrast; markings necessary for hockey or curling are also placed, along with logos or other decorations. Another thin layer of water is sprayed on top of this. The ice is built up to a thickness of 19 to 38 mm (3/4 to 1 1/2 in).

=== Synthetic ===
Synthetic rinks are constructed from a solid polymer material designed for skating using normal metal-bladed skates. High-density polyethylene (HDPE) and ultra-high-molecular-weight polyethylene (UHMW) are the only materials that offer reasonable skating characteristics, with UHMW synthetic rinks offering the most ice-like skating but also being the most expensive. A typical synthetic rink consists of many panels of thin surface material assembled on top of a sturdy, level and smooth sub-floor (anything from concrete to wood or even dirt or grass) to create a large skating area.

== Operation ==
Periodically after the ice has been used, it is resurfaced using a machine called an ice resurfacer (sometimes colloquially referred to as a Zamboni – referring to a major manufacturer of such machinery). For curling, the surface is 'pebbled' by allowing loose drops of cold water to fall onto the ice and freeze into rounded peaks.

Between events, especially if the arena is being used without need for the ice surface, it is either covered with a heavily insulated floor or melted by allowing the fluid in the pipes below the ice to warm.

A highly specialized form of rink is used for speed skating; this is a large oval (or ring) much like an athletic track. Because of their limited use, speed skating ovals are far less common than hockey or curling rinks.

Those skilled at preparing arena ice are often in demand for major events where ice quality is critical. The popularity of the sport of hockey in Canada has led its icemakers to be particularly sought after. One such team of professionals was responsible for placing a loonie coin under center ice at the 2002 Winter Olympics in Salt Lake City, Utah; as both Canadian teams (men's and women's) won their respective hockey gold medals, the coin was christened "lucky" and is now in the possession of the Hockey Hall of Fame after having been retrieved from beneath the ice.

== Standard rink sizes ==
=== Bandy ===
Standard field measurements for a bandy rink

In bandy, the size of the playing field is 90–110 m (300–360 ft) x 45–65 m (148–213 ft). For internationals, the size must not be smaller than 100 m × 60 m (330 ft × 200 ft). The variety rink bandy is played on ice hockey rinks.

=== Figure skating ===
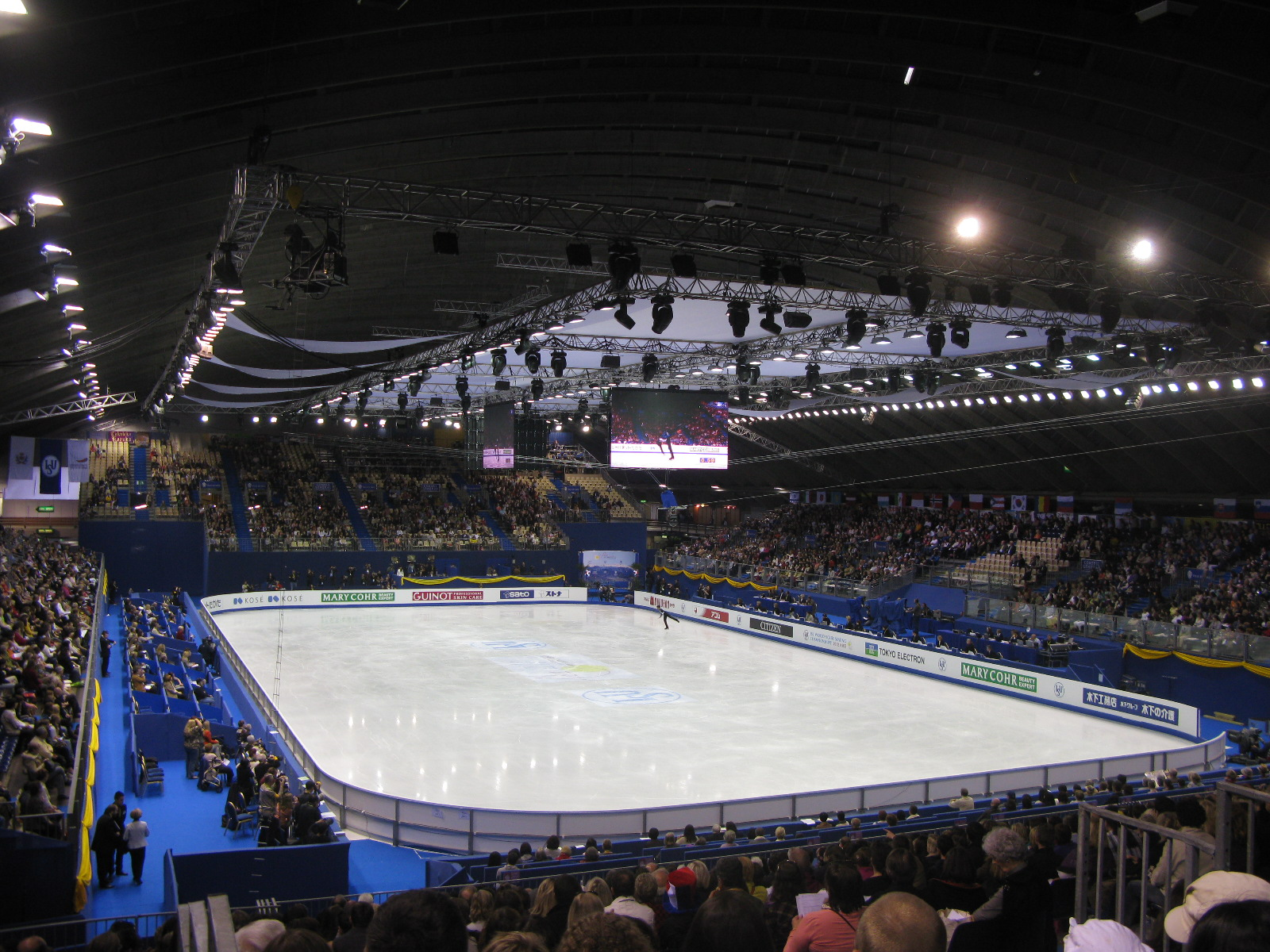
Rink at the Acropolis Exhibition Center in France in 2012

The size of figure skating rinks can be quite variable, but the International Skating Union prefers Olympic-sized rinks for figure skating competitions, particularly for major events. These are 60 by 30 m (197 by 98 ft). The ISU specifies that competition rinks must not be larger than this and not smaller than 56 by 26 m (184 by 85 ft).

=== Ice hockey ===
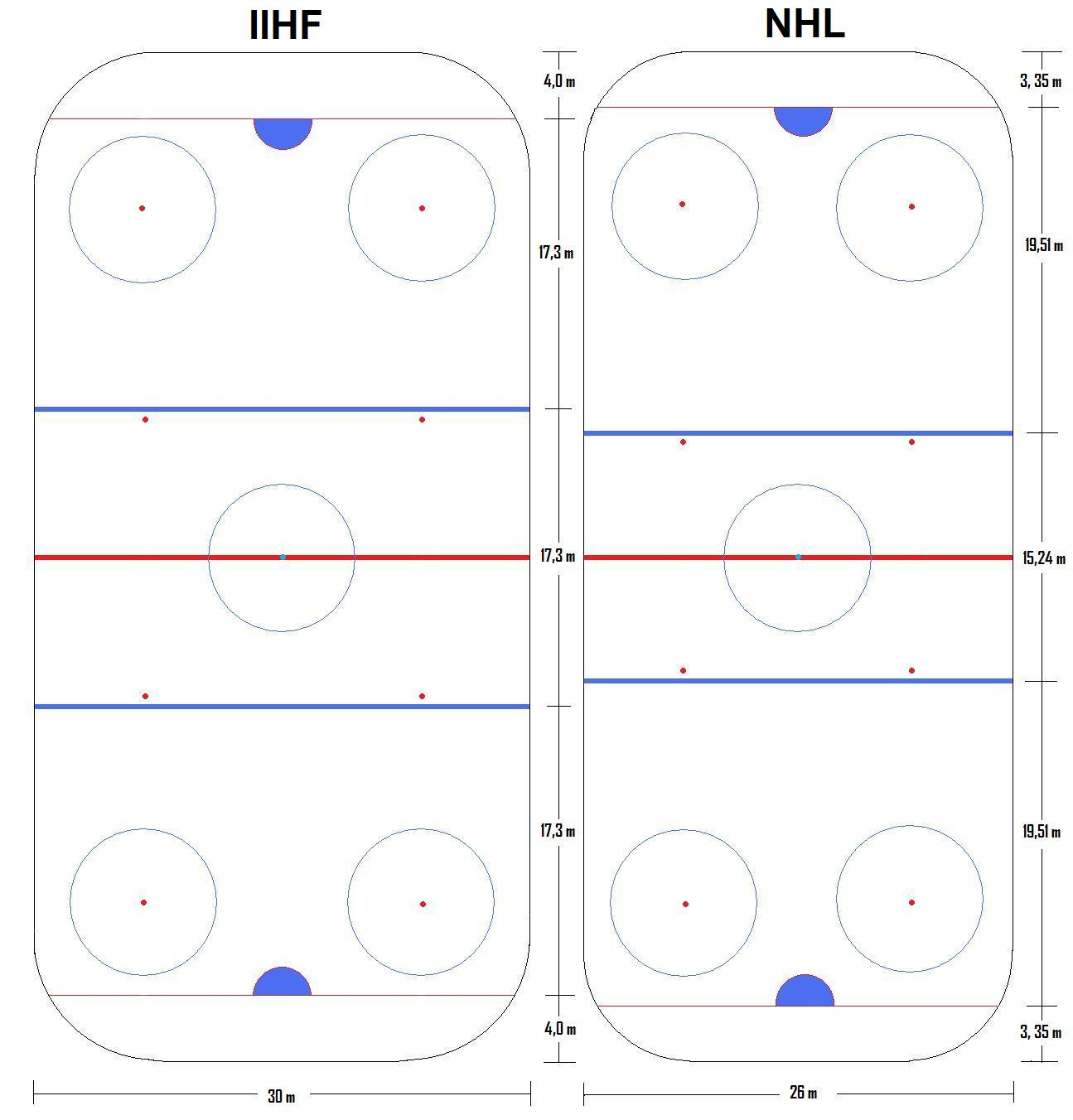
Rink dimensions used by the IIHF and the NHL

Although there is a great deal of variation in the dimensions of actual rinks, there are basically two rink sizes in use at the highest levels of ice hockey. Historically, earlier rinks were smaller than today.

Official National Hockey League rinks are 26 m × 61 m (85 ft × 200 ft). The dimensions originate from the size of the Victoria Skating Rink in Montreal, Quebec, Canada.

Official Olympic and International ice hockey rinks have dimensions of 30 m × 60 m (98.4 ft × 197 ft).

=== Para ice hockey ===
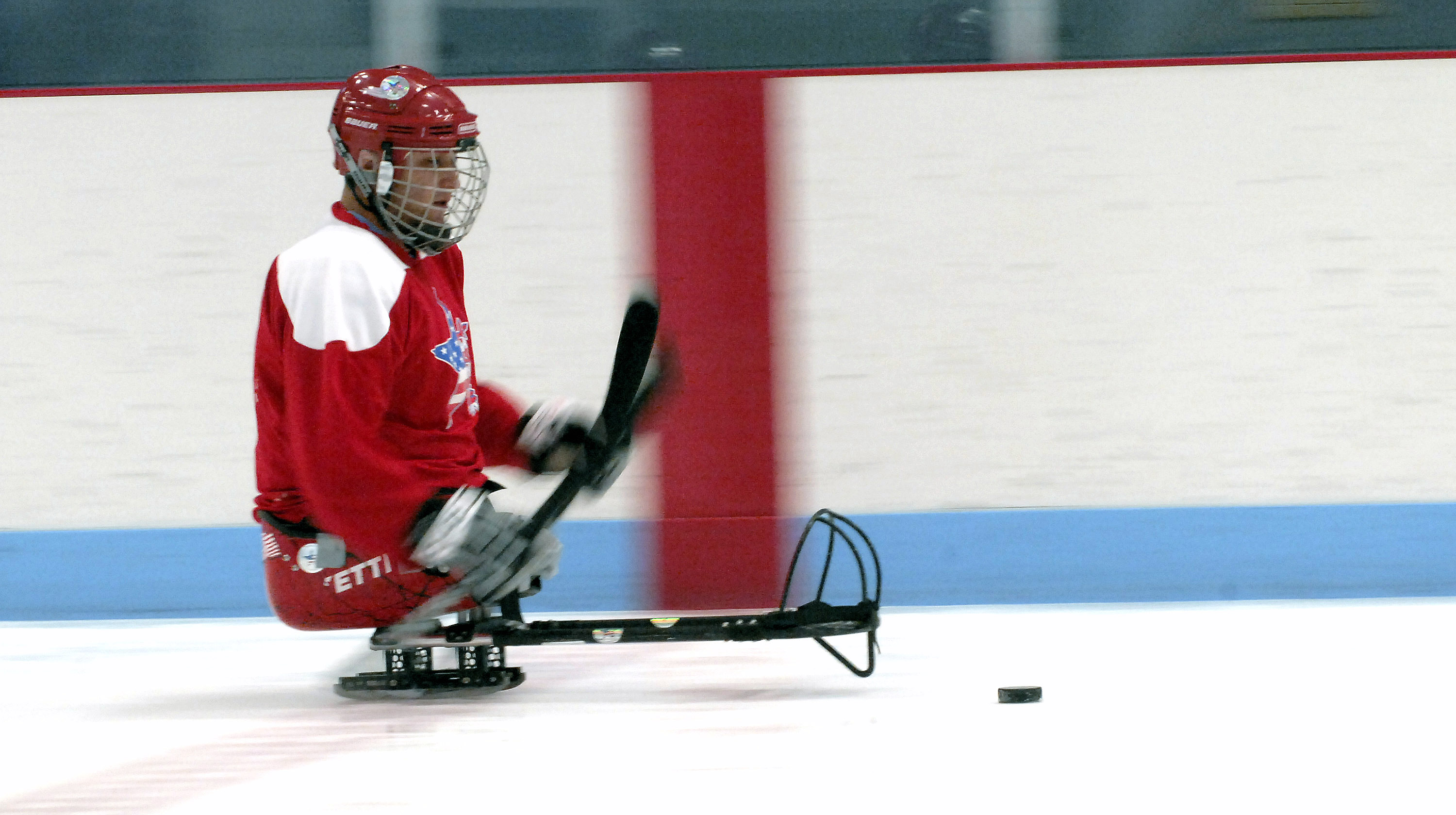
Para ice hockey player

Sledge hockey (a.k.a. "Para ice hockey", or "sled hockey"), uses the same rink dimensions used by hockey rinks.

=== Ringette ===
Typical layout of an ice hockey rink surface

Ringette utilizes most of the standard hockey markings used by Hockey Canada, but the ringette rink uses additional free-pass dots in each of the attacking zones and centre zone areas as well as a larger goal crease area. Two additional free-play lines (one in each attacking zone) are also required.

A ringette rink is an rink designed for hockey which has been modified to enable ringette to be played. Though some ice surfaces are designed strictly for ringette, these rinks with exclusive lines and markings for ringette are usually created only at venues hosting major ringette competitions and events. Most ringette rinks are found in Canada and Finland.

Playing area, size, lines and markings for the standard Canadian ringette rink are similar to the average hockey rink in Canada with certain modifications.

Early in its history, ringette was played mostly on rinks constructed for hockey, broomball, figure skating, and recreational skating, and was mostly played on outdoor rinks since few indoor rinks were available at the time.

=== Broomball ===
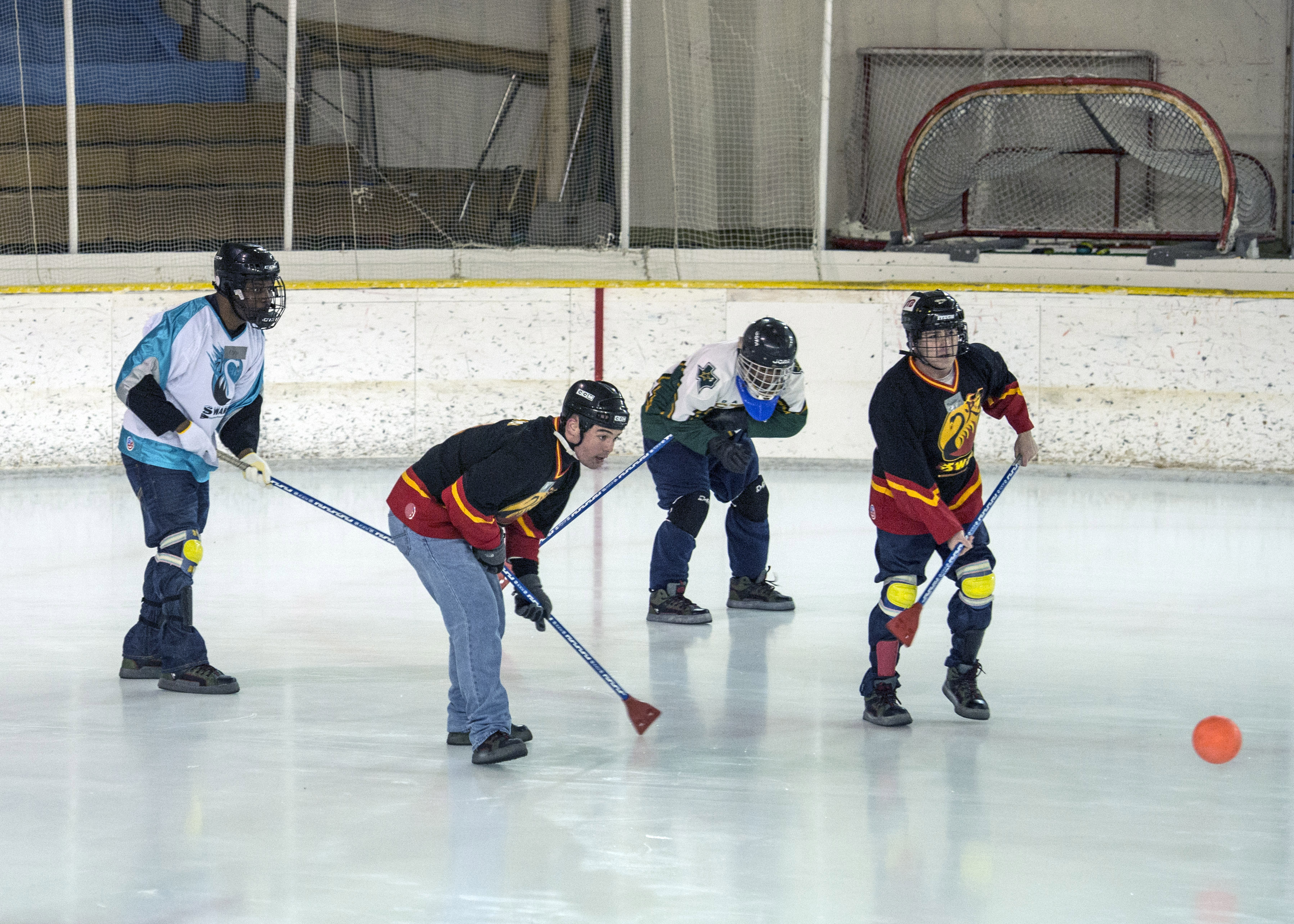
Broomball players

The organized format of broomball uses the rink dimensions defined by a standard Canadian hockey rink.

=== Spongee ===
The sport of spongee, a.k.a. "sponge hockey", does not use skates. A skateless outdoor winter variant of hockey, spongee has its own rules codes and is played strictly within the Canadian city of Winnipeg as a cult sport. The sport generally uses the rink dimensions defined by a standard Canadian hockey rink.

=== Rinkball ===
Rinkball rinks today typically use the measurements of an ice hockey rink, though may be slightly larger due to the sport having originated in Europe where the bandy field influenced the size and development of smaller rinks.

== Tracks and trails ==
Tracks and trails are occasionally referred to as ice rinks in spite of their differences.

Ice skating tracks and ice skating trails are used for recreational exercise and sporting activities during the winter season including distance skating. Ice trails are created by natural bodies of water such as rivers, which freeze during winter, though some trails are created by removing snow to create skating lanes on large frozen lakes for skaters.

Ice trails are usually used for pleasure skating, though the sport and recreational activity of Tour skating can involve skaters passing over ice trails and open areas created by frozen lakes.

To date, speed skating and ice cross downhill are the only winter activities or sports whereby skaters use tracks and lanes designed to include bends rather than using a simple straightway. Some rinks are constructed in a manner allowing for a speed skating rink to be created around its outside perimeter.

=== Tracks ===
==== Speed skating track ====
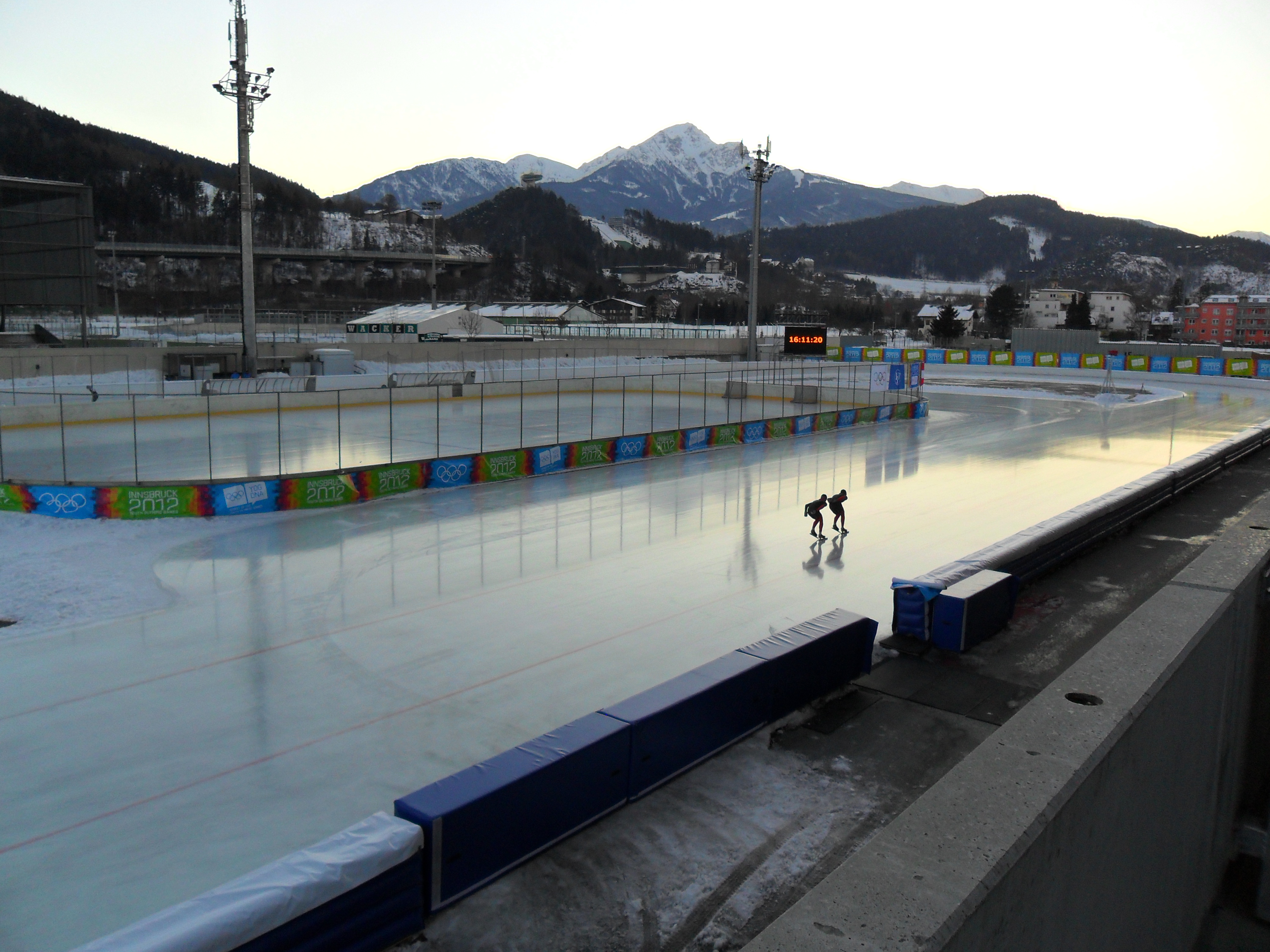
Outdoor speed skating track in Innsbruck

Speed skating tracks or "rinks" can either be created naturally or artificially and are made either outdoors or inside indoor facilities. Tracks may be created by having the lanes surround the exterior of an rink.

The sport requires the use of a special type of racing skate, the speed skating ice skate.

Dimensions of a standard speed skating rink

In speed skating, for short track, the official Olympic rink size is 30 m × 60 m (98 ft × 197 ft), with an oval ice track of 111.12 m (364.6 ft) in circumference.

In long track speed skating the oval ice track is usually 400 m (1,300 ft) in circumference.

==== Ice skating marathon tracks ====
An ice skating marathon is a long-distance speed skating race which may be held on natural ice on canals and bodies of water such as lakes and rivers. Marathon is a discipline of speed skating, which is founded in the Netherlands.

The races concern speed skating by at least five skaters who start all together on an rink with a minimum length of 333.33 meters or on a track:

- Minimum distance longer than 6.4 kilometers and up to 200 kilometers for skaters who have reached the age of 17 prior to the skating season on July 1.
- Minimum distance longer than 4 kilometers and up to 20 kilometers for skaters who have reached the age of or the age of 13, but have not yet reached the age of 17 before July 1 preceding the skating season.
- Minimum distance of 2 kilometers and up to 10 kilometers for skaters who have not yet reached the age of 13 before July 1 preceding the skating season.

==== Dutch skating tracks ====
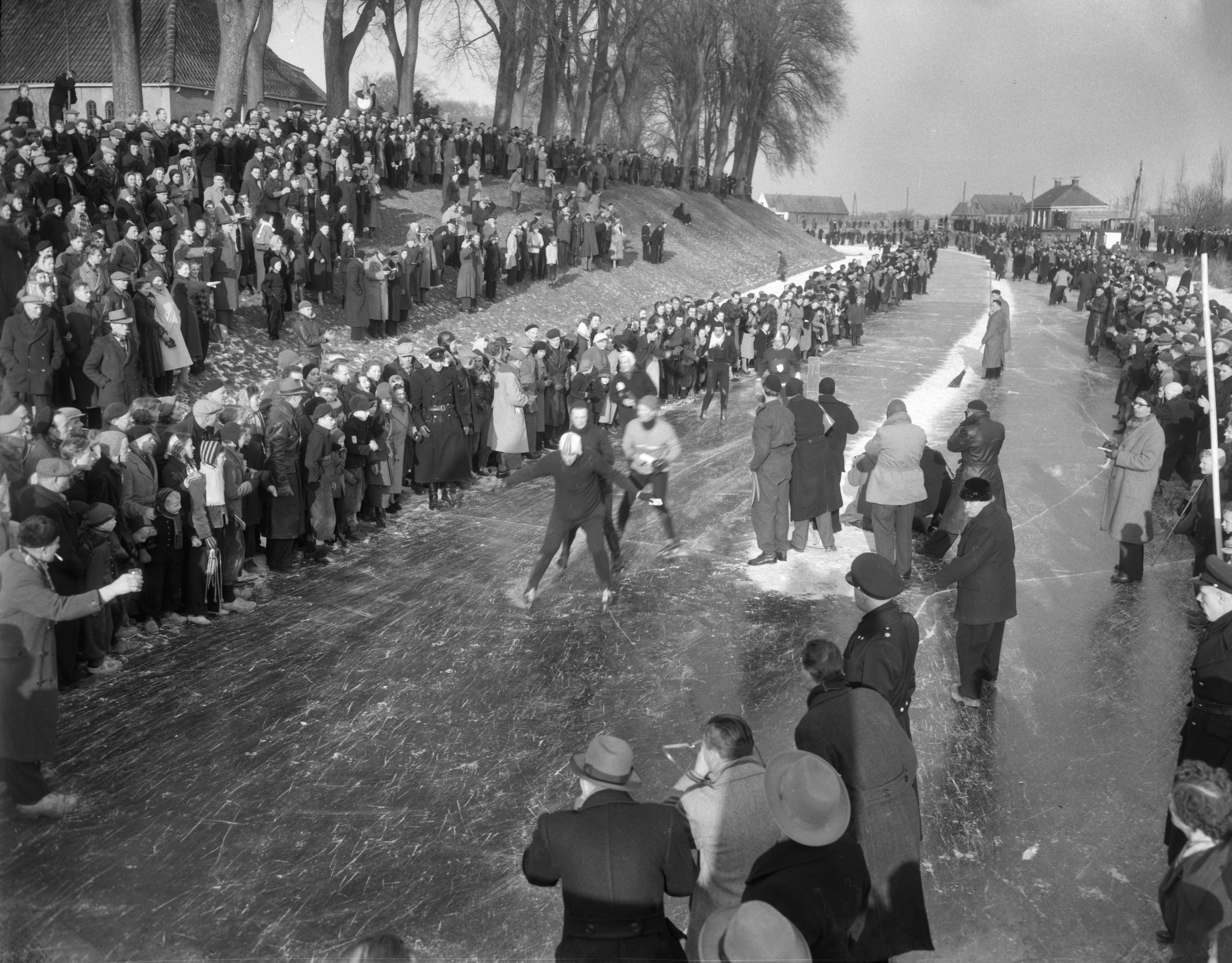
Elfstedentocht, 1954

The Netherlands is home of Elfstedentocht, a 200 km distance skating race of which the tracks leads through the 11 different cities in Friesland which is a northern province of the Netherlands.

Skate tracks on natural ice are maintained by the towns and communities, who take care of the safety of the tracks.

==== Ice cross downhill tracks ====
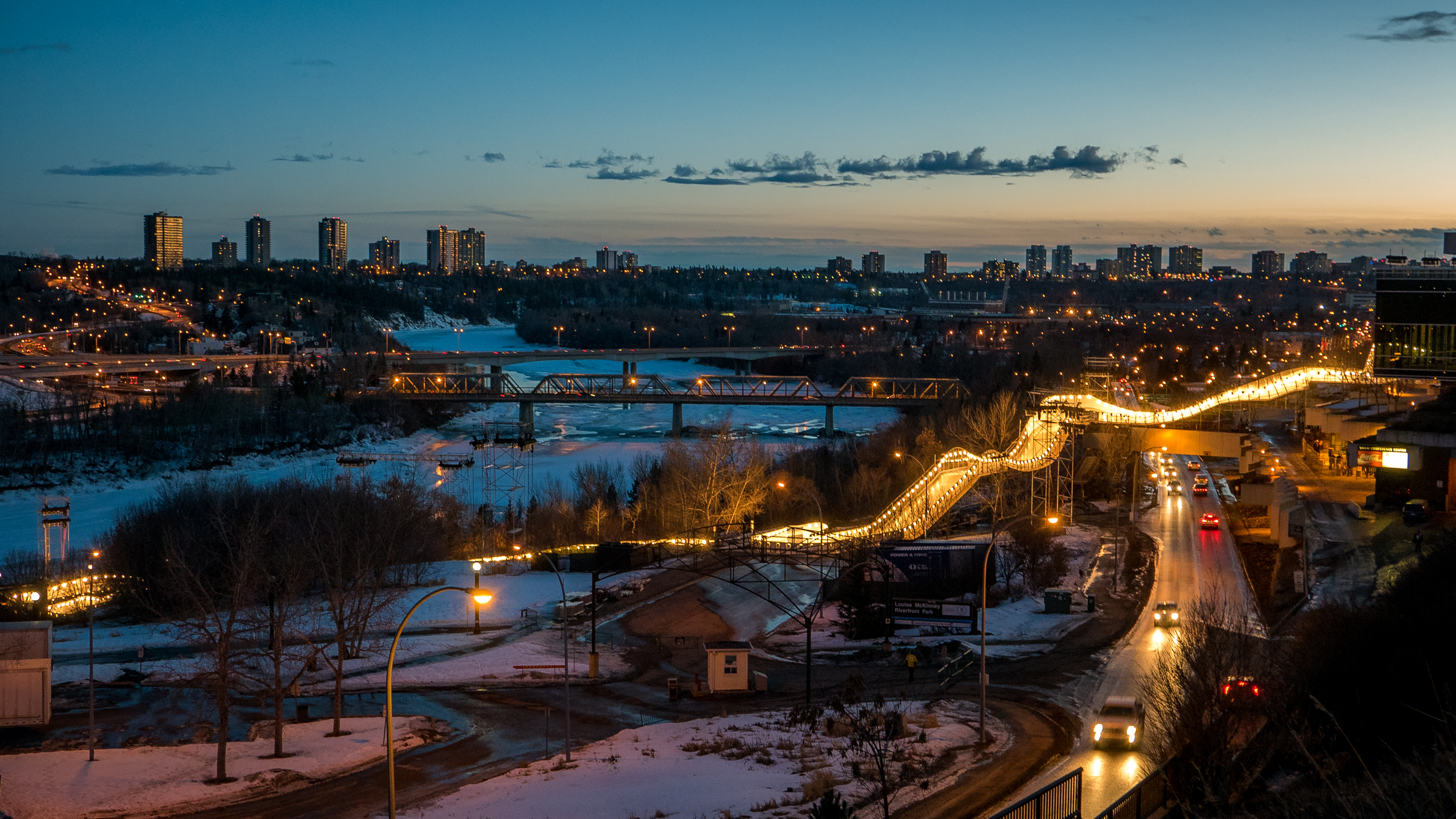
Ice cross downhill track in Edmonton, Alberta, Canada, 2015

Ice cross downhill, (formerly known as "Red Bull Crashed Ice" or "Crashed Ice"), is a winter extreme sporting event involving direct competitive downhill skating. Skaters race down a walled track which features sharp turns and high vertical drops.

=== Trails ===
==== Rideau Canal Skateway ====
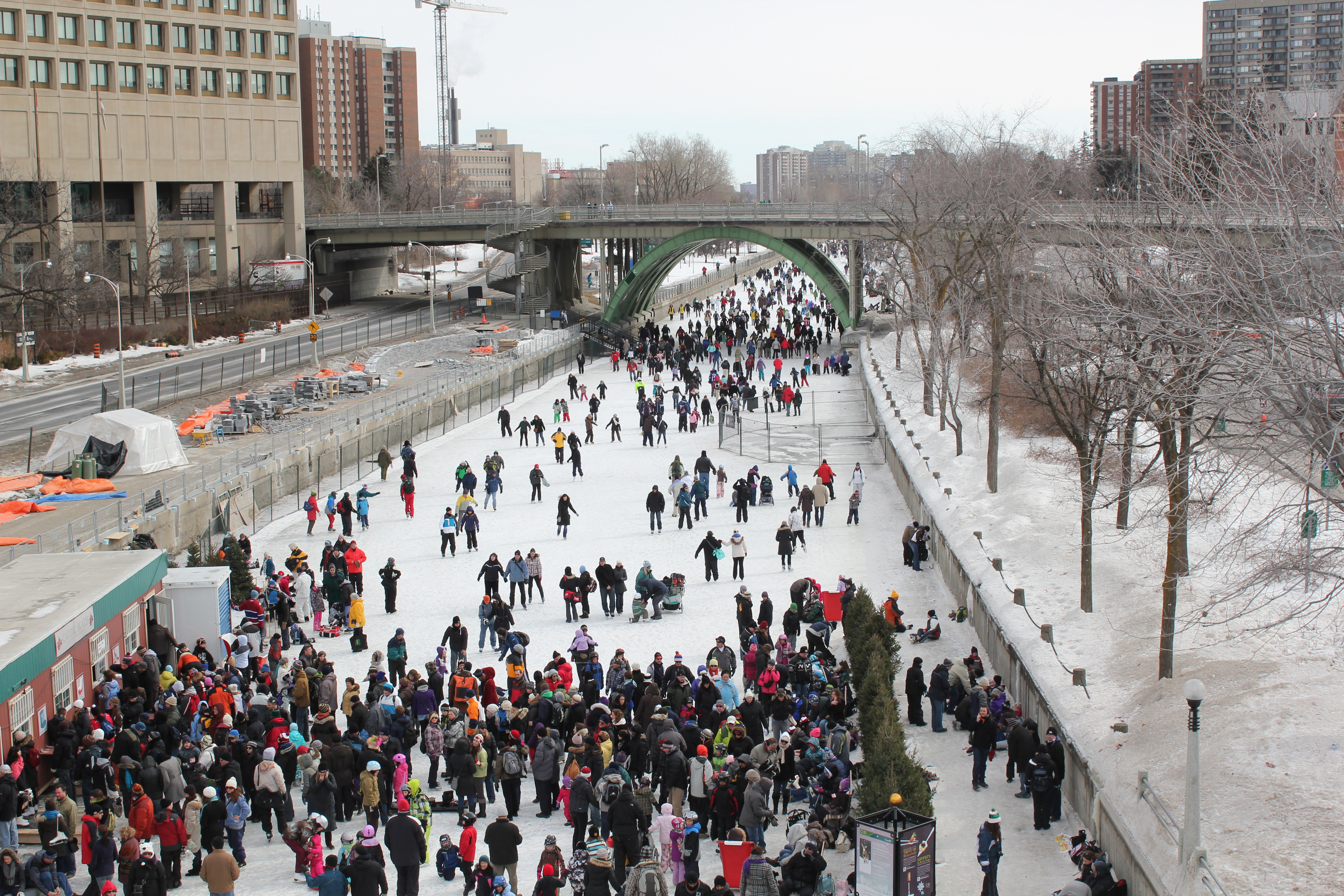
A portion of the Rideau Canal in Ottawa, Ontario, Canada, the world's largest naturally frozen "ice rink" or skating trail

An example of an ice skating trail, or "rink", is the Rideau Canal Skateway in Ottawa, Ontario, Canada, estimated at 165,600 m^{2} (1,782,000 ft^{2}) and 7.8 km (4.8 mi) long, which is equivalent to 90 Olympic-size skating rinks.

The rink is prepared by lowering the canal's water level and letting the canal water freeze. The rink is then resurfaced nightly by cleaning the ice of snow and flooding it with water from below the ice. The rink is recognized as the "world's largest naturally frozen ice rink" by the Guinness Book of World Records because "its entire length receives daily maintenance such as sweeping, ice thickness checks and there are toilet and recreational facilities along its entire length".

==== Longest trail ====
The longest ice skating trail is in Invermere, British Columbia, Canada, on Lake Windermere Whiteway. The naturally frozen trail measures 29.98 km (18.63 mi).

=== Combined ===
Outdoor skating activities and competitions involving a goal of distance travel for recreation, exercise, competition and adventure, can involve frozen lakes, rivers, and canals.

==== Tour skating ====
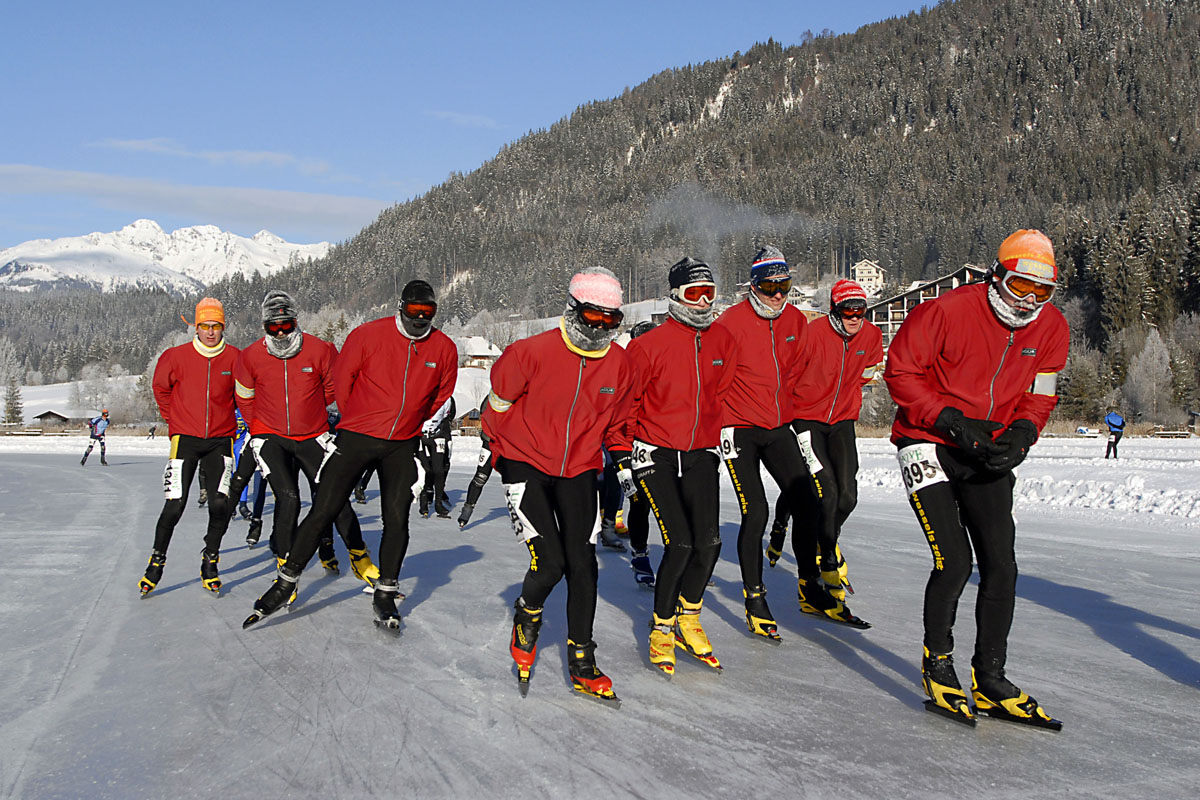
Skaters in a marathon race on Weissensee (Carinthia), using nordic skates

The sport and recreational activity, tour skating (a.k.a. "Nordic skating" in North America), is strictly an outdoor activity for ice skaters. Nordic skating originated during the 1900s in Sweden.

Skaters traverse naturally frozen bodies of water, which sometimes, but not always, includes interconnected ice trails as well as frozen ponds, lakes, and even marsh areas. Tour skaters use a special skate with long blades.

==== Elfstedentocht (Eleven cities tour) ====
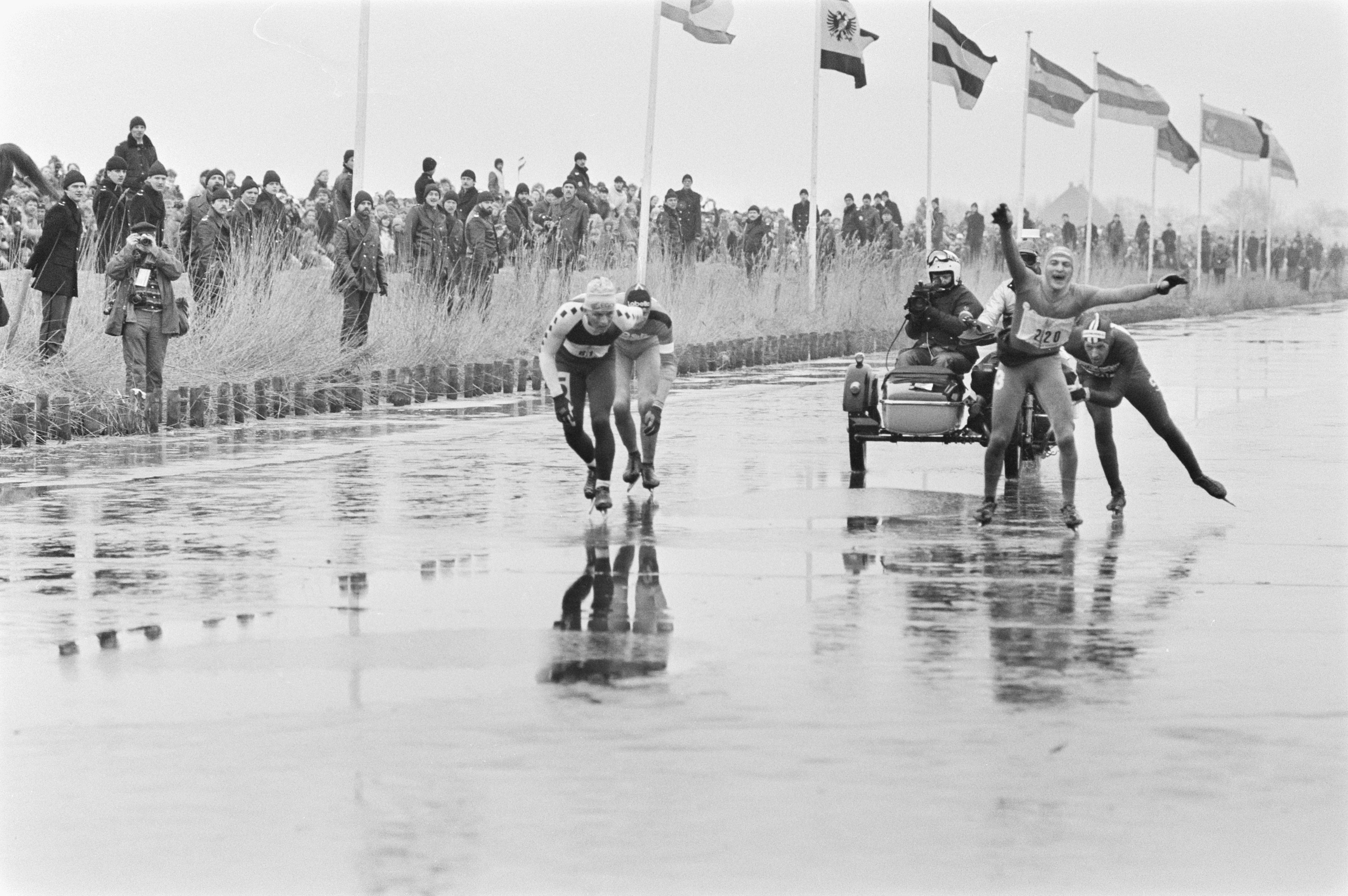
The leading group during the 1985 Elfstedentocht, racing towards the finish, February 21, 1985

The Elfstedentocht (Eleven Cities Tour) is a long-distance tour skating event on natural ice, almost 200 kilometres (120 mi) long, which is held both as a speed skating competition (with 300 contestants) and a leisure tour (with 16,000 skaters). It is the biggest ice-skating tour in the world and held in the province of Friesland in the north of the Netherlands.

The event leads past all 11 historical cities of the province and is held at most once a year, only when the natural ice along the entire course is at least 15 centimetres (6 in) thick. It is sometimes held on consecutive years, while at other times, gaps between the touring years have exceeded 20 years. When the ice is suitable, the tour is announced and starts within 48 hours. The last Elfstedentocht was held in 1997.

== Laneways ==
The sports of curling and ice stock sport are played on either rinks or simple ice surfaces with lanes marked out for play.

=== Curling ===
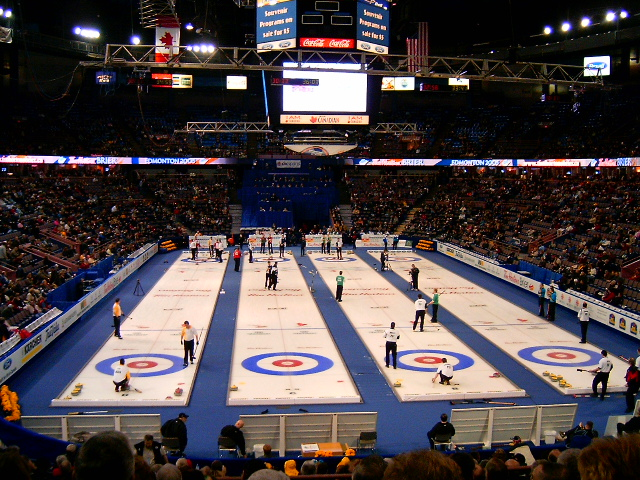
Example of a curling sheet

Curling sheet details. The 12-foot circle covers the backline.

The sport of curling uses an rink known as a "curling rink" or curling sheet. Curling does not involve skating. Curling uses lanes.

The curling sheet is a carefully prepared rectangular area of ice created to be as flat and level as possible. The ice surface dimensions are 146 to 150 feet (45 to 46 m) in length by 14.5 to 16.5 feet (4.4 to 5.0 m) in width. A curling sheet includes areas marked off in a manner specific to the sport, including the house, the button, hog lines, hacks, and shorter borders along the ends of the sheet called the backboards.

The dimensions of an official curling sheet is defined by the World Curling Federation Rules of Curling. At major events, ice preparation and maintenance is extremely important. Curling clubs usually have an ice maker whose main job is to care for the ice.

A curling sheet, with dimensions in feet (1' = 1 ft = 0.3 m).
CL: Centreline • HOL: Hogline • TL: Teeline • BL: Backline • HA: Hackline with Hacks • FGZ: Free Guard Zone

=== Ice stock sport ===
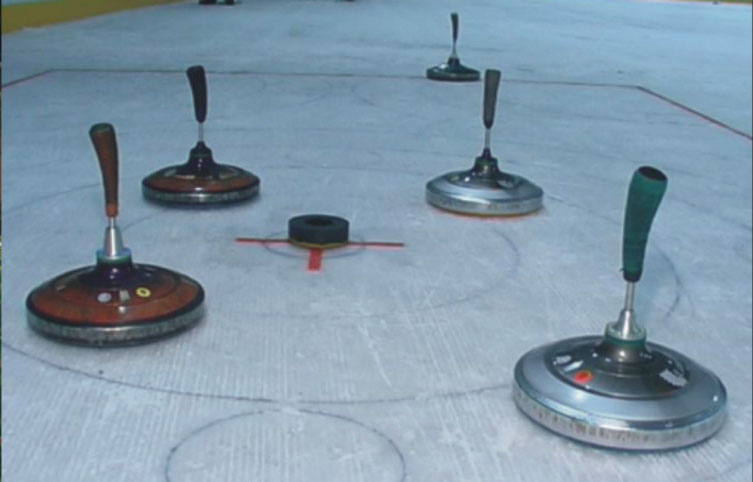
Game in progress

Ice stock sport (sometimes spelt "icestocksport" or "Bavarian curling") is a winter sport comparable to curling. It is called Eisstockschießen in German. Although the sport is typically played on ice, summer competitions are performed on asphalt.

== Other ==
=== Crokicurl ===
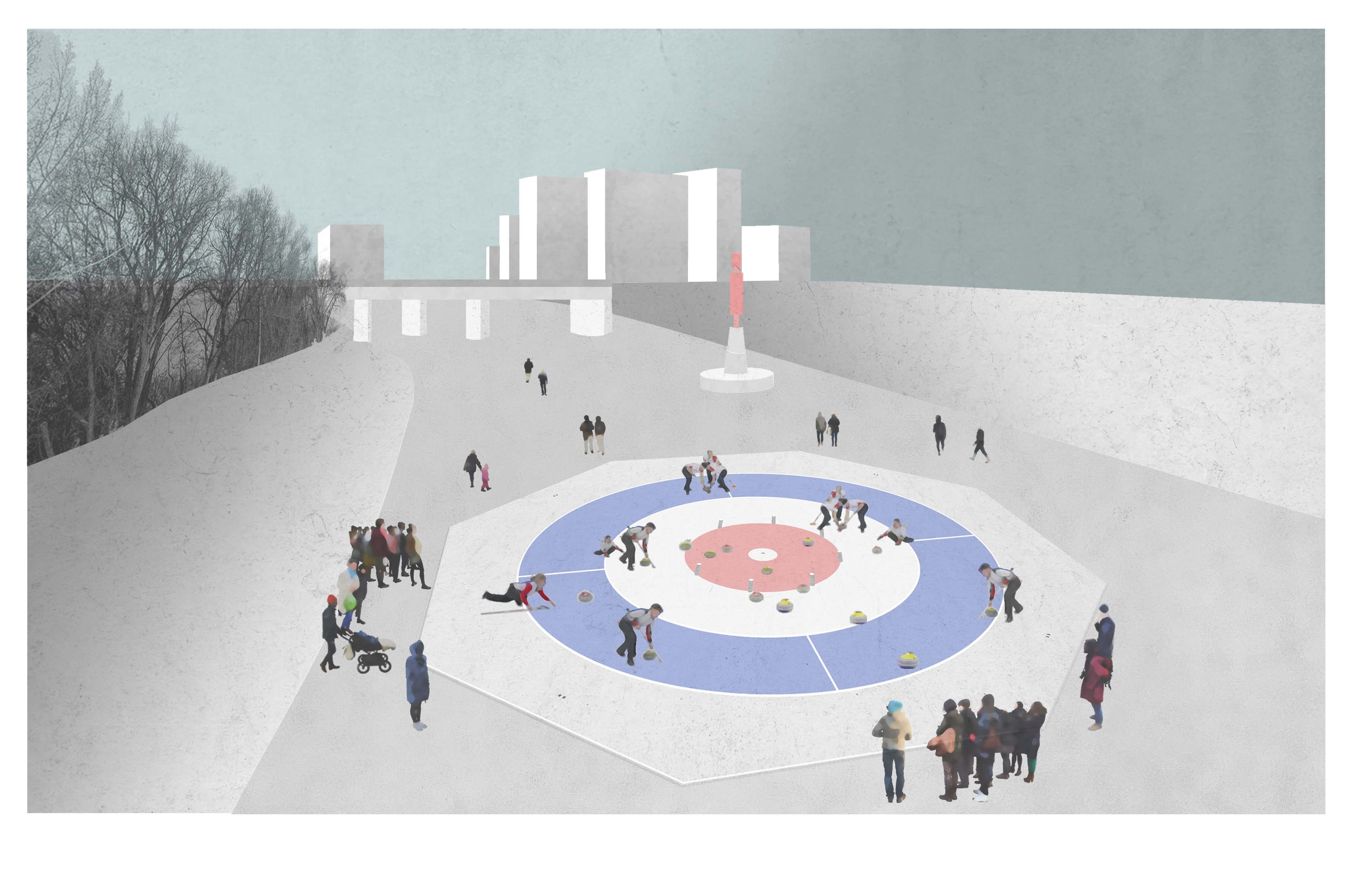
Crokicurl playing area

Crokicurl is a Canadian winter sport and is a large scale hybrid of curling and the board game Crokinole. It is played outdoors by teams consisting of two players who take turns trying to score points on a quadrant shaped area with the playing area marked off on a sheet of ice. The quadrant includes posts, starting line, wooden edge side-rail, and a 20-point "button". Depending on the area involved, players can score 5, 10, or 15 points.

== Outdoor ice ==
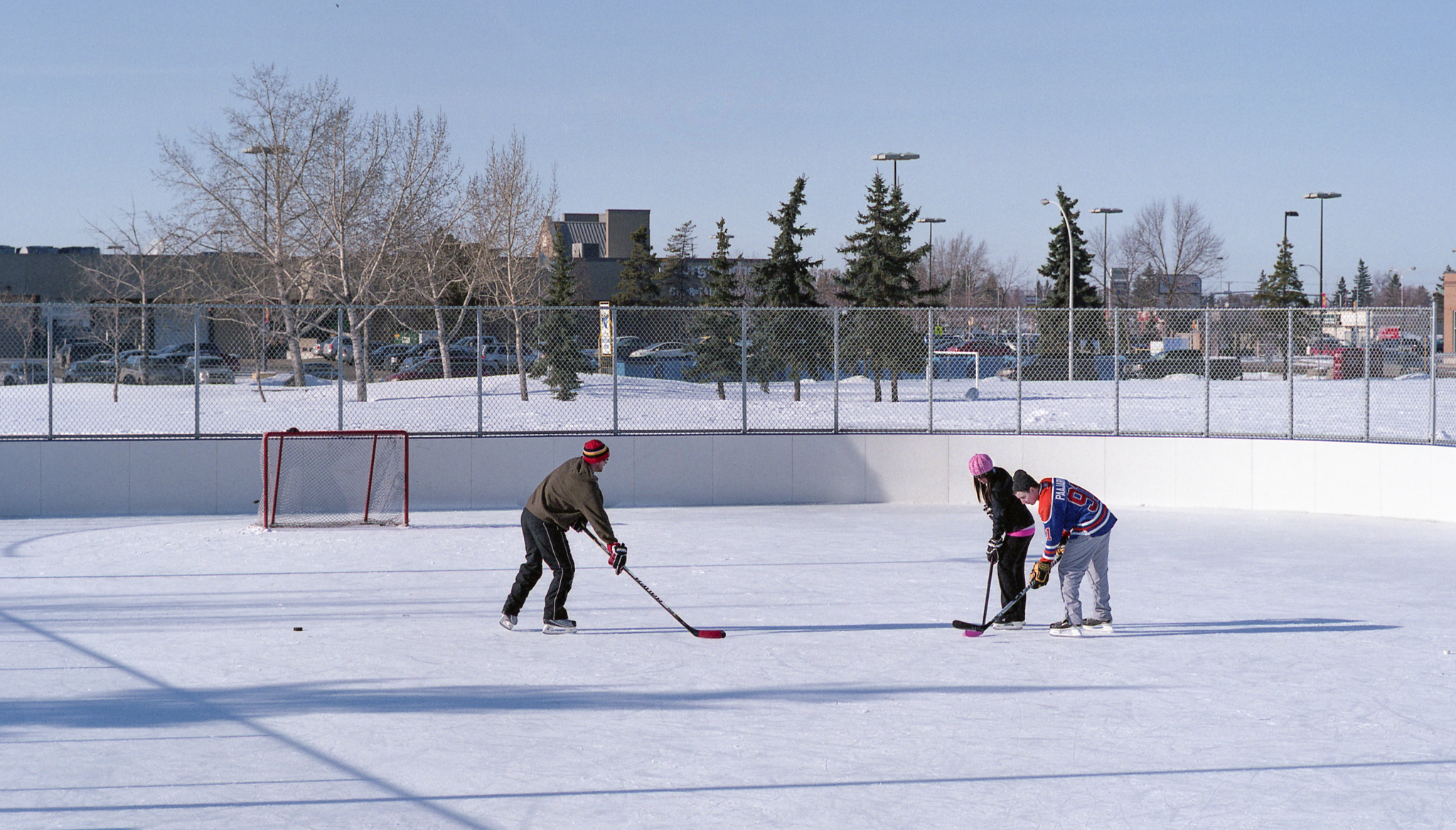
Ice hockey has been a popular outdoor winter pastime in Canada for over a century

Outdoor rinks and frozen ponds, rivers, and canals, serve several purposes, allowing for physical activities during the winter season such as recreational skating and figure skating, and also function as an affordable place for players to engage in team winter sports such as ice hockey, bandy, rinkball, ringette, broomball, and spongee, as a pastime.

These areas and facilities also help individuals, youth sporting organizations, and families, offset the expensive cost of indoor ice-time. They are also used as a part of outdoor winter festivals and to host pond hockey tournaments and the like.

=== Decline ===
==== Rinks ====
The length of outdoor skating season began to experience a noticeable decline in North America in the early part of the 21st century.

One of the correlated factors involved has been attributed to climate change. One of the consequences involved includes reducing access to outdoor facilities needed by youth who require opportunities to participate in ice-based sports at length and with low-cost, a problematic development considering winter sports become increasingly expensive over time resulting in economic exclusion.

RinkWatch

RinkWatch is a citizen science program in Canada run by researchers at Wilfrid Laurier University in Waterloo, Ontario. Beginning in 2013 the program started collecting data on outdoor rinks and frozen ponds across North America. The objective is to better understand how climate change may be impacting the outdoor skating season.

==== Tracks and trails ====
Elfstedentocht, the world's biggest ice-skating tour involving tour skating and speed skating, has been declared to be in danger of "extinction" due to climate change. The last Elfstedentocht was held in 1997.

== See also ==
- Bandy field
- Figure skating rink
- Ice hockey rink
- Speed skating rink
- Curling sheet
- Synthetic ice
- List of ice hockey arenas by capacity
