= Dan Ladouceur =

Canadian lacrosse player

Personal information
- Nickname: Big Dog
- Born: November 26, 1973 (age 52) Thunder Bay, Ontario, Canada
- Height: 6 ft 6 in (198 cm)
- Weight: 245 lb (111 kg; 17 st 7 lb)

Sport
- Position: Defence
- Shoots: Left
- NLL team: Toronto Rock
- Pro career: 1999–2009

Dan "Big Dog" Ladouceur (born November 26, 1973, in Thunder Bay, Ontario) is a Canadian former professional lacrosse player in the National Lacrosse League, where he played with the Toronto Rock from 1999 to 2009. He won five NLL championships with the Rock before retiring during the 2009 season.

Outside of lacrosse, Ladouceur is a constable with the Durham Regional Police Service.

On August 6, 2013, Ladouceur was announced as an assistant coach of the Toronto Rock, alongside Blaine Manning.

== Statistics ==
=== NLL ===
Dan Ladouceur		Regular season									Playoffs								
Season	Team	GP	G	A	Pts	LB	PIM	Pts/GP	LB/GP	PIM/GP	GP	G	A	Pts	LB	PIM	Pts/GP	LB/GP	PIM/GP
1999	Toronto Rock	9	0	1	1	16	47	0.11	1.78	5.22	2	0	0	0	2	7	0.00	1.00	3.50
2000	Toronto Rock	12	1	1	2	19	43	0.17	1.58	3.58	2	0	0	0	8	0	0.00	4.00	0.00
2001	Toronto Rock	13	1	0	1	20	60	0.08	1.54	4.62	2	0	0	0	2	2	0.00	1.00	1.00
2002	Toronto Rock	16	2	2	4	29	55	0.25	1.81	3.44	2	1	1	2	2	4	1.00	1.00	2.00
2003	Toronto Rock	16	1	2	3	38	54	0.19	2.38	3.38	2	0	0	0	7	0	0.00	3.50	0.00
2004	Toronto Rock	14	0	0	0	13	32	0.00	0.93	2.29	1	0	0	0	3	0	0.00	3.00	0.00
2005	Toronto Rock	12	0	2	2	22	20	0.17	1.83	1.67	2	0	0	0	7	4	0.00	3.50	2.00
2006	Toronto Rock	12	0	0	0	13	45	0.00	1.08	3.75	–	–	–	–	–	–	–	–	–
2007	Toronto Rock	10	0	2	2	30	21	0.20	3.00	2.10	1	0	0	0	5	2	0.00	5.00	2.00
2008	Toronto Rock	14	0	1	1	19	30	0.07	1.36	2.14	–	–	–	–	–	–	–	–	–
2009	Toronto Rock	4	0	0	0	13	21	0.00	3.25	5.25	–	–	–	–	–	–	–	–	–
		132	5	11	16	232	428	0.12	1.76	3.24	14	1	1	2	36	19	0.14	2.57	1.36
Career Total:		146	6	12	18	268	447	0.12	1.84	3.06									

GP–Games played; G–Goals; A–Assists; Pts–Points; LB–Loose balls; PIM–Penalty minutes; Pts/GP–Points per games played; LB/GP–Loose balls per games played; PIM/GP–Penalty minutes per games played.

=== NLL head coaching statistics ===
Team	Season	Regular Season				Playoffs				Playoff result
Team	Season	GC	W	L	W%	GC	W	L	W%	Playoff result
New York Riptide	2022	18	6	12	.333	–	–	–	–	Did not qualify
New York Riptide	2023	18	5	13	.278	–	–	–	–	Did not qualify
New York Riptide	2024	18	8	10	.444	–	–	–	–	Did not qualify
Ottawa Black Bears	2025	18	8	10	.444	–	–	–	–	Did not qualify
Totals:	4	72	27	45	.375	–	–	–	–	
