= Defense (sports) =

Preventing an opponent from scoring

In many team sports, defense (American spelling) or defence (Commonwealth spelling) is the action of preventing an opponent from scoring. The term may also refer to the tactics involved in defense, or a sub-team whose primary responsibility is defense. Similarly, a defense player or defender is a player who is generally charged with preventing the other team's forwards from being able to bear down directly on their own team's goalkeeper or goaltender. Such positions exist in association football, ice hockey, water polo and many other sports.

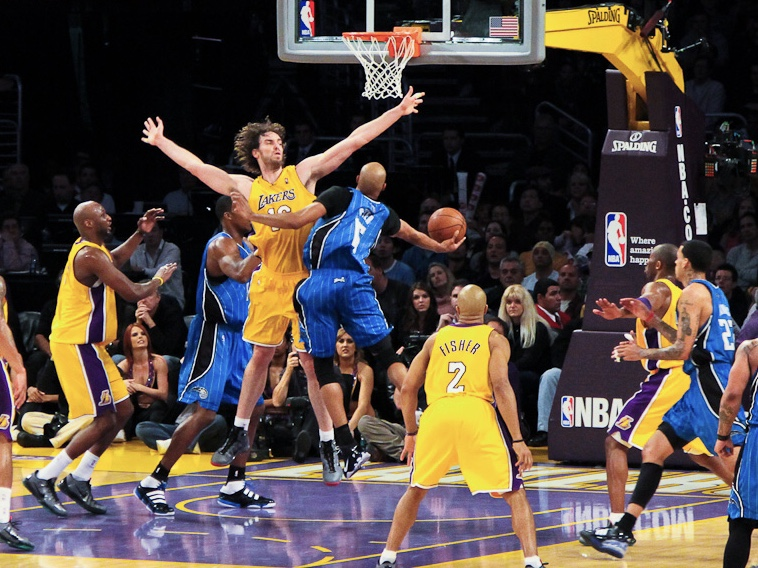
Pau Gasol (yellow, outstretched arms) plays defense in a basketball game by protecting the basket as his opponent Vince Carter (blue, holding ball) attempts to score with a layup

Goaltender Braden Holtby (kneeling) defends the net from an incoming shot on goal in an ice hockey game, while his teammate Matt Niskanen (#2) defends against Sidney Crosby from collecting the puck on a rebound.

== Bat-and-ball sports ==
In bat-and-ball sports, the defending team is in the field, while the offensive team sends only a few players into the field to try to score at a time. These sports generally involve a member of the defense throwing the ball to a member of the offensive team, who then tries to hit it and run to various safe areas of the field to score points. Failing to hit the ball properly, or failing to reach the safe areas before the ball is used against the offensive player, can result in that player being left unable to score.

=== Baseball ===
Baseball is unlike most other competitive sports in that the defense is given control of the ball. Additionally, the number of players on the field at any given time is lopsided in favor of the defense which always has nine players on the field; the offense has between one and four.

Historically, each player on the team had a role both on offense and defense. Most amateur and professional leagues have adopted the designated hitter (DH) rule introduced by the American League of Major League Baseball. In leagues that use the DH, pitchers usually do not bat, and the DH bats in lieu of the pitcher and does not play a defensive position. The main league that has not adopted the DH rule is the Central League of Nippon Professional Baseball.

Each play starts with the ball in the hands of the pitcher, whose job as a member of the defense is to prevent the batter from reaching base. The pitcher throws the ball toward the catcher, who must catch the pitched ball if it is not hit by the batter. In each half-inning, the defense attempts to force three outs.

There are three basic ways in which an out can occur:

- If three strikes are recorded against the batter,
- if a ball hit by a batter is caught by a defensive player before it hits the ground,
- if a runner who is between bases or has not reached a base to which he is forced or put out by a defensive player in possession of the ball.

If the batter manages to hit the ball, all nine defensive players become active and use the ball in attempting to prevent the batter from reaching base and runners already on base from advancing or scoring, while the offense is busy attempting to move runners around the baseball diamond toward home plate, the defense uses the ball in various ways to achieve outs.

If the defense forces three outs, their team is moved into the offensive role. The exception is if it is the ninth or an extra inning and they are ahead, in which case, the game ends and the defensive team wins.

=== Cricket ===
In cricket, the fielding team is the defense, while the batting team is the offense; the batting team can only put two players on the field at a time. By getting the batting team's batsmen out before they can hit the ball to the boundary or run between the two batsmen's grounds, the fielding team can prevent the batting team from scoring points. Players can be gotten out if they hit the ball in the air and it is caught by a defensive player before touching the ground, or if the ball hits a batsman's wicket, either when delivered by the bowler or when the batsman is not in his ground. By getting all but one of the batting team's players out, the fielding team ends their opponent's scoring turn, and may begin its own scoring turn next (though it can choose not to, in the case of the follow-on).

== Water sports ==
=== Water polo ===
In water polo, if an offensive player, such as the center forward, has the ball in front of the goal, and the defender cannot steal the ball, he may intentionally commit a foul. The forward then has a free throw but must pass the ball off to another offensive player, rather than making a shot at the goal. Defensive perimeter players may also intentionally cause a foul and then move toward the goal, away from their attacker, who must take a free throw. This technique, called 'sloughing', allows the defense an opportunity to double-team the center forward and possibly steal the inbound pass. The water polo referee may refrain from declaring a foul caused by a defensive player, if in his judgment this would give the advantage to the defending team. This is known as the Advantage Rule.

== Winter sports ==
=== Ice skating team sports ===
There are four officially established ice skating team sports worldwide, excluding their variants. This group includes: bandy, ice hockey, ringette, and rinkball.

==== Ice hockey ====
In ice hockey, there are normally two designated defencemen on the ice. A defenseman can be an offensive player better known for their ability to glean goals or assists rather than for their strong defensive play. These players are referred to as offensive defensemen. Alternatively, a defenseman can play a more defensive role and rarely show up on the score sheet but remain important for their defensive prowess; these players are known as stay-at-home defense. This role, however, is becoming increasingly relegated to the past, as ice hockey teams demand more active play from their defenders. There are also defensemen who are good at both; known as two-way defensemen. Defense is a team game in hockey, and when the team is not in possession of the puck (also known as puck coverage), the aim is to effectively suppress the puck pressure coming from the opponents.

==== Bandy ====
In bandy, the number of defenders on the ice at a given time depends on the format being played, either "big ice" bandy which has a type of field format, or rink bandy.

==== Ringette ====
In ringette, there are two designated defenders on the ice in any normal game situation (the team is not serving any penalties). However, due to ringette's first-three-in rule these situations can vary; those playing in the defensive zone are not always designated defenders.

==== Rinkball ====
In rinkball, the number of defenders on the ice at a given time depends on the format being played.

=== Skateless winter team sports ===
There are three known organized skateless winter team sports worldwide, that are not organized forms of snowball fighting. This group includes: broomball, Spongee (a.k.a. "sponge hockey"), and Moscow broomball.

==== Broomball ====
In broomball, the number of defenders on the ice at a given time depends on the format being played.

==== Spongee ====
In spongee (a.k.a. "sponge hockey"), the number of defenders on the ice at a given time depends on the format being played.

==== Moscow broomball ====
In Moscow broomball, the number of defenders on the ice at a given time depends on the format being played.

== Tag sports ==
=== Atya patya ===
In atya patya, the defenders aim to tag players on the offensive team in order to eliminate them and prevent them from scoring.

=== Kabaddi ===
In kabaddi, the defenders aim to avoid being touched by the opposing team's raider; if the defenders can tackle the raider or "dash" the raider out-of-bounds so that the raider cannot return to the other half of the field, then the defenders score 1 point.

=== Kho kho ===
In kho kho, the defenders aim to avoid being tagged. Defenders take to the field in batches of three, with tagged defenders eliminated from play, and a new batch entering the field once the entire previous batch has been dismissed.

== See also ==
- Defensive Player of the Year Award
- Offense (sports)
- Goalkeeper
- Goaltender
- Man-to-man defense
- Sports strategy
