= The Walking Company =

American footwear company

- Industry: Footwear
- Founded: 1991; 35 years ago in Chatsworth, California
- Founders: Steve Adler and Jim Argyropoulos
- Headquarters: Henderson, Nevada, United States
- Area served: United States
- Products: Shoes
- Website: www.thewalkingcompany.com

The Walking Company (sometimes referred to as TWC), is a United States–based comfort footwear company and subsidiary of WalkingCo LLC, that was founded in 1991 in Chatsworth, California.

== History ==
Co-founders Steve Adler and Jim Argyropoulos created the plan for The Walking Company (formerly The Walking Store) after Argyropoulos’ return from a vacation in Europe, where he was inspired by European footwear designs. In July 1991, they opened and self-financed the first store in Pasadena, California. Shortly after the store's opening, it faced some setbacks and endured through several earthquakes and a fire. Nonetheless, Adler and Argyropoulos opened four more stores within a year of opening their first location.

Adler attributed the company's initial success to its narrow focus on a specific walking shoe category sold at a reasonable price targeting 56 million Americans in the walking market. "You're not going to be able to buy a great $50 technical walking shoe," Adler said in 1992. "We're trying to bring the price points down to $100."

In 2004, TWC was acquired by Big Dogs Holdings, Inc., based in Santa Barbara, California, and Andrew Feshbach became the CEO of the company. At the time of acquisition, The Walking Company operated 72 stores in 28 states.

In 2009, TWC filed for bankruptcy. The company originally planned to close 90 of 210 stores, but after receiving rent concessions from landlords and key vendors, was able to emerge from bankruptcy in April 2010 with 207 stores still in place.

The company reorganized its brand in 2010, and The Walking Company became a subsidiary of The Walking Company Holdings, Inc., along with Big Dogs, an activewear and accessories brand. By 2015, The Walking Company had expanded to 212 mostly mall-based retail stores and a distribution center in Lincolnton, North Carolina.

In March 2018, the company filed for bankruptcy again. On June 29 of that year, the company announced it was emerging from bankruptcy after receiving over $10 million in new equity, and was closing 23 of the 208 stores that were open at the time of the filing.

In 2021, as a result of the COVID-19 pandemic, all remaining retail locations were closed. The Walking Company and ABEO trademarks were acquired by WalkingCo LLC, a new ownership entity and the brand pivoted to a direct-to-consumer e-commerce model.

In 2023, The Walking Company relaunched its flagship brand, ABEO, which had previously generated approximately $80 million in sales in 2014. Through ABEO, The Walking Company positioned itself as a major retailer in the comfort footwear market. The ABEO brand is associated with orthopedic and supportive biomechanical shoe design, offering a broad selection of shoe categories featuring metatarsal footbed options intended to help alleviate forefoot pain and relieve common foot conditions such as plantar fasciitis and metatarsalgia.

The ABEO brand has a long history of partnering with foot health thought leaders in product development. Identifying a gap in the market for supportive footwear, The Walking Company collaborated with Tom Andriacchi, a professor of mechanical engineering and orthopedic surgery at Stanford University, and Steve Goldband, a research scientist at Stanford’s Center on Longevity, to develop the ABEO SMARTsystem™ collection. The line was designed primarily for older consumers experiencing cartilage and ligament deterioration, combining biomechanical research with contemporary design to promote comfort and functionality.

Following the 2023 relaunch, The Walking Company emphasized enhanced craftsmanship and higher-quality materials in ABEO products, while maintaining a focus on comfort and orthopedic support. Key design features include deep heel cups, arch supports, optional metatarsal footbeds, and cushioned, wider toe boxes. Many styles are made from water-resistant or water-repellent leathers, and several models are machine washable.

ABEO footwear also includes its proprietary BIOsystem® orthotic footbed technology, which incorporates built-in orthotics developed using data from extensive foot scans, customer feedback, and foot health research. The brand received favorable recognition from consumers and podiatrist reviewers, including being cited by Health.com for offering the best running shoes with orthopedic insoles for plantar fasciitis, as well as the best loafers and boots for plantar fasciitis.

In 2024, The Walking Company launched its own self-branded footwear line, featuring sandals, slippers, boots, and mules. The company also introduced a range of shoe care products, including sneaker wipes, water-repellent sprays, and cleaning kits. Operating under the slogan "Authentic Comfort," The Walking Company continues to emphasize comfort-oriented and orthopedic footwear, with several of its offered brands carrying the American Podiatric Medical Association (APMA) Seal of Acceptance.

== Other brands ==
The Walking Company is home to Raffini Umberto and Tara M. brands. In 2009, the company developed ABEO, a selection of comfort footwear made with built-in or removable orthotics. By 2010, the ABEO brand expanded to casual styles and athletics and had generated $3 million in revenue with plans to reach $80 million in revenue in the following four years.
