= Little Dog =

Little Dog can refer to:

- Canis Minor, the constellation
- Little Dog (TV series), a Canadian television comedy-drama series
- LittleDog, a small quadruped robot developed by Boston Dynamics for research in 2010
- Little Dog Mountain, in Montana
- Little Dog Island, in Tasmania
- Little Seal Dog Island, in the British Virgin Islands
- "Little Dog", a song by Lou Reed and Metallica from Lulu
- Little dog, a non standard poker hand

== See also ==
- Big Dog (disambiguation)
