= Big Dog (company) =

Clothing brand

Big Dog Holdings, Inc.
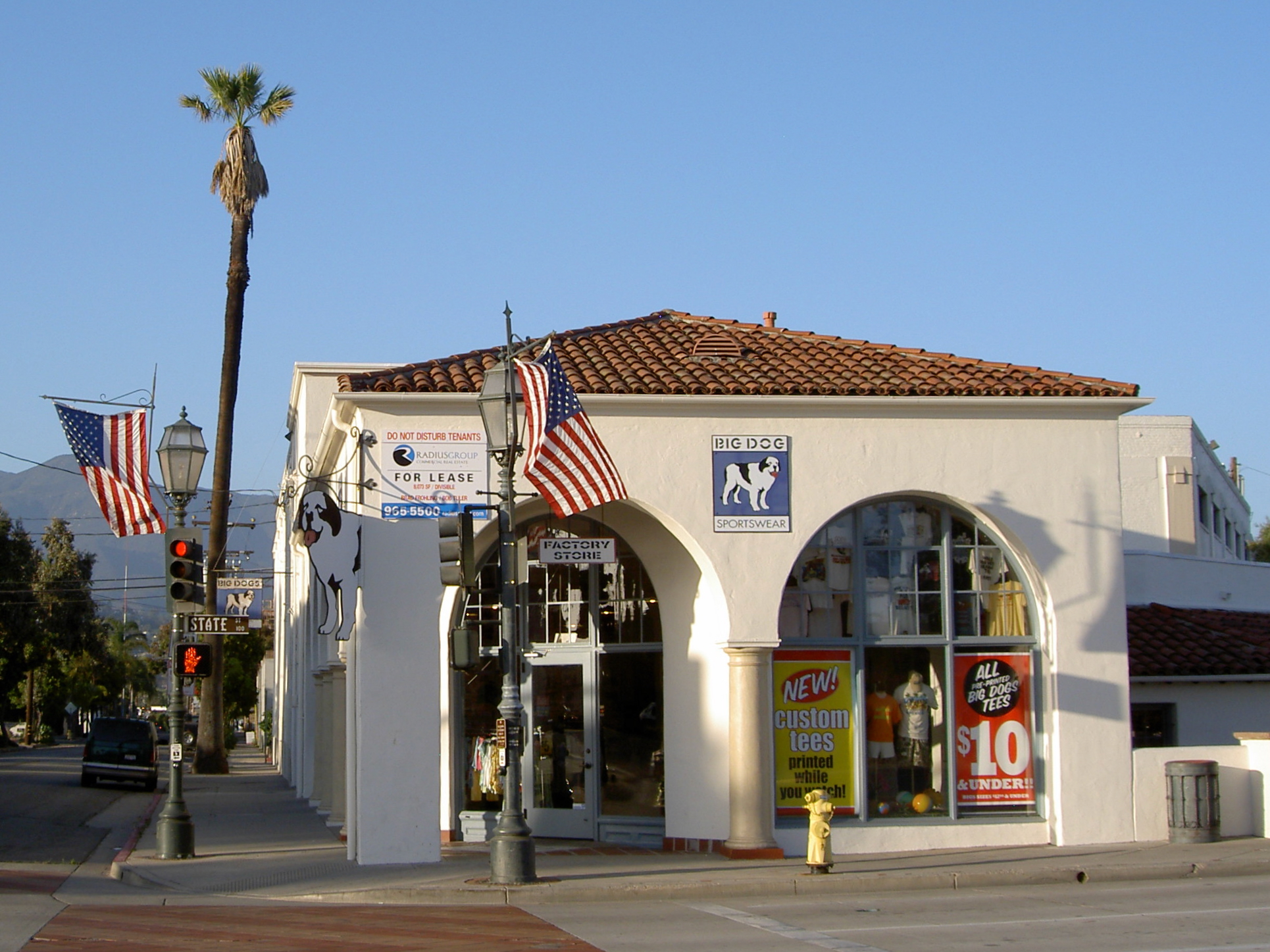
- Former factory store in Santa Barbara, California
- Company type: Public
- Industry: Clothing
- Predecessor: Sierra West
- Founded: 1983; 43 years ago in Santa Barbara, US
- Founder: Richard Kelty and Rick Scott
- Headquarters: Santa Barbara, California, United States
- Parent: The Walking Company Holdings, Inc.
- Website: www.bigdogs.com

Big Dog, or Big Dogs, is a sports clothing company founded in 1983. The company is famous for its logo of a Saint Bernard appearing on their merchandise.

== History ==
In 1971, Richard Kelty and Rick Scott founded a camping-gear company called Sierra West. They became the first manufacturer to wholesale products made with Gore-Tex fabric. In their first run, the 1000 jackets Sierra West sold to L.L. Bean contained delaminated Gore-Tex. This resulted in Gore-Tex needing to change their formula. After W. L. Gore & Associates corrected the problem, Sierra West's waterproof clothing became a success. By 1985, Sierra West was one of the top ten backpacking gear companies in the US.

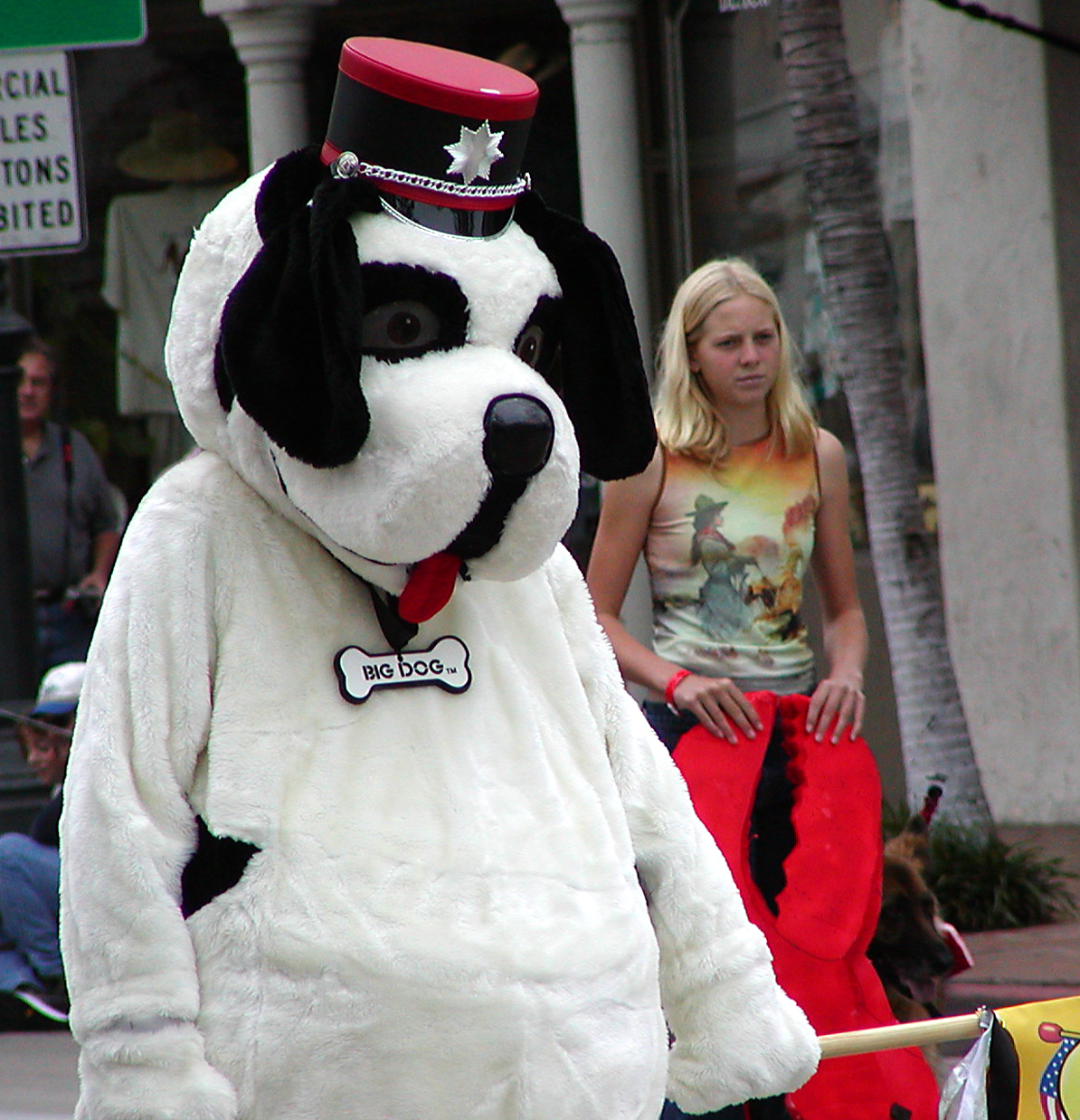
Big Dog Mascot at Parade

According to company lore, in 1983, a group of white water rafters were gifted oversized shorts before launching into the water. One of the recipients remarked "Man, these puppies are big!" This later inspired the name "Big Dog" for the brand. However, an alternate version of the story describes Gib Mann, a designer at the company, using the term "Big Dog" throughout conversation when he first joined Sierra West. Mann and Joy Moran designed skirt-like soccer shorts for Patagonia employee and soccer fan, Roger McDivitt. When Kelty and his team saw the shorts they repeatedly said "Man those puppies are big."

In 1990, Sierra West declared bankruptcy. It was reported that new ownership that pivoted the business model to selling in outlet malls negatively impacted the reputation of the brand and led to Sierra West's bankruptcy. The brand's IPO raised $39.2 million in 1997, although it initially hoped for $49 million.

In 2004, The Walking Company (TWC) was acquired as a subsidiary by Big Dogs. At the time of acquisition, TWC operated 72 stores in 28 states. In 2009, TWC filed for bankruptcy but emerged a year later with support from landlords and key vendors.
