= Spongee =

Ice hockey variant

- Nicknames: "sponge hockey"; "tweeter"
- First played: 1950; 76 years ago First organized league founded by John Robertson in 1978

Characteristics
- Contact: No
- Type: Outdoors only; Team sport; Winter sport
- Equipment: Soft sponge puck; Ice hockey stick; Ice hockey equipment; Broomball shoes or winter boots/running shoes
- Venue: (Canada) Standard outdoor Canadian ice hockey rink

Presence
- Country or region: Winnipeg, Manitoba, Canada
- Olympic: No
- Paralympic: No
- World Games: No

Spongee or sponge hockey is a winter sport and a variant of ice hockey that is played on outdoor ice rinks without ice hockey skates. It is played almost exclusively in Winnipeg, Manitoba, Canada, and has been played by thousands of players in dozens of leagues. The sport takes its name from the type of puck used, which is soft sponge puck as opposed to the hard vulcanized rubber puck used in traditional ice hockey.

Equipment is generally the same as that used in ice hockey but player positions are different. The sport excludes bodychecking and is non-contact. The sport was at one time called "Tweeter" because of the sound the early pucks made. Since spongee's beginning in roughly the 1950s, players have increasingly begun to use broomball shoes instead of street shoes or winter boots.

Winnipeg's first organized spongee league was started in 1978 by Canadian, John Robertson, though the game itself is believed to actually date back to 1950s Winnipeg, making it younger than broomball but potentially older than the Canadian organized sport of ringette by about a decade. It is believed that the "Tumbleweeds" are Manitoba's oldest continuously active spongee team.
