= Crokicurl =

Canadian winter sport

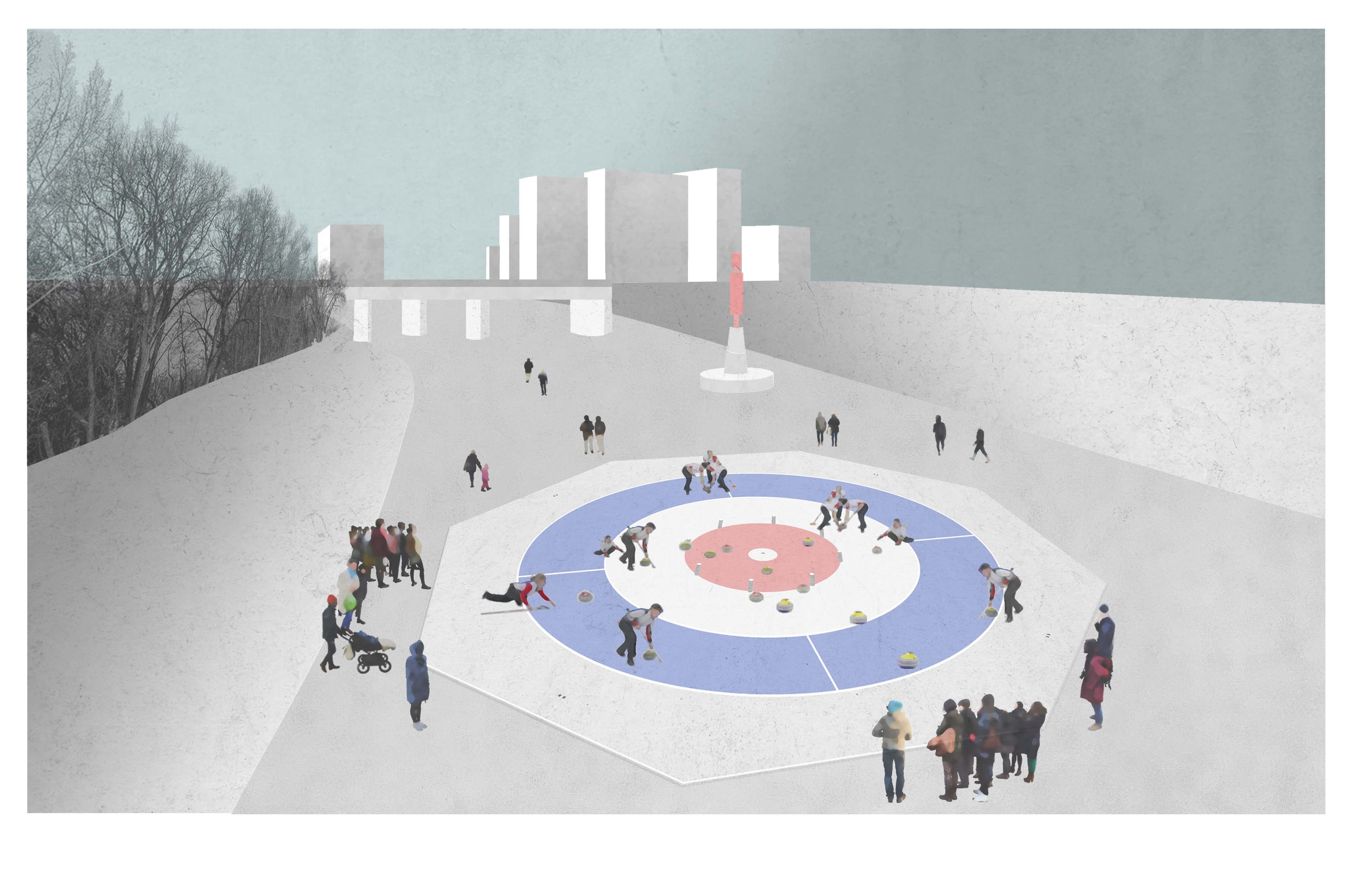
- Illustration of a crokicurl game in progress
- First played: 2016; 10 years ago, Winnipeg

Characteristics
- Team members: 2 players
- Type: Winter team sport

Presence
- Country or region: North America
- Olympic: No
- Paralympic: No
- World Games: No

Crokicurl is a Canadian winter sport invented by Liz Wreford and Leanne Muir of Public City Architecture in 2016 and first played in Winnipeg, Manitoba. The game is a large scale hybrid of curling and the board game crokinole.

In the related game of crokinole, the players take turns flicking small discs on a circular board, to score highest depending on where the disc lands on the board, where the regions are marked with score.

== Play and rules ==
In crokicurl, rocks are used instead of discs, and its rocks are roughly the size of a curling stone. The game uses junior curling stones which are 11 kilograms (25 lb) instead of 17–20 kilograms (38–44 lb) for regular curling stones.

The game is played by teams consisting of two players, trying to score points by throwing the stones into the centre of the ice where the circles are marked. The highest circle is marked with twenty points.

== Locations ==
Crokicurl has spread from Winnipeg all across Canada to small towns and large cities. A list is included below.

- Saskatoon, Saskatchewan
- Warman, Saskatchewan
- Calgary
- Regina, Saskatchewan
- Kenora, Ontario
- Guelph
- Penetanguishene, Ontario
- Midland, Ontario
- Wiikwemkoong First Nation
- Ramara, Ontario
- Toronto, Ontario,
- Fort St. John, BC
- Gull Lake, Saskatchewan
- Melfort, Saskatchewan
- Binscarth
- Sylvan Lake, Alberta
- Hanna, Alberta
- Prince Albert, Saskatchewan
- Estevan, Saskatchewan
- Neepawa, Manitoba
- Yorkton, Saskatchewan
- Swift Current, Saskatchewan
- Shellbrook, Saskatchewan
- Weyburn, Saskatchewan
- Saguenay, QC
- Deep River, Ontario
- McKenzie Lake (Madawaska River)
- Cobden, Ontario
- Cornwall, Prince Edward Island
- La Ronge
- Morden, Manitoba
- Crowsnest Pass, Alberta
- Cypress River, Manitoba

== United States ==
The first US rink created, and contested national championship, was on Valentine's Day weekend 2021 in Altoona, Wisconsin.
