= Glossary of ice hockey terms =

This is a list of common terms used in the sport of ice hockey along with the definitions of these terms.

== 0-9 ==
1-man advantage
See five on four.
2 and ten
When an offending player gets a minor penalty and a ten-minute misconduct.
2-man advantage
See five on three.
2-on-1
See odd man rush.
3-on-2
See odd man rush.
5-on-3
See five on three.
5-on-4
See five on four.
5-on-5
See full strength.
5 and a game
See match penalty.

== A ==
angling
Pushing an opposing team's player to the side in the defensive zone, keeping them out the middle of the defensive zone.
apple
A slang term for an assist.
assist
Attributed to up to two players of the scoring team who shot, passed, or deflected the puck towards the scoring teammate.
attacking zone

The opposing team's end of the ice, extending from the blue line to the end boards behind their goal; i.e. the area of the ice in which a given team attempts to attack the opposing goal to create scoring chances.

== B ==
backhand
A pass or shot that is taken from the backside of the blade of the stick.
backcheck

Rushing back to one's own defensive zone, especially with players who normally play forward positions, in response to an opposing team's attack.
black ace
A minor professional league or junior amateur league player recalled to their parent NHL club for the Stanley Cup playoffs.
blocker
The rectangular pad that a goaltender wears on the stick-holding hand, sometimes also called a waffle pad.
blue line
Either of the two straight lines separating the attacking and defending zones from the neutral zone.
blueliner
A defenseman.
boarding
Checking a defenseless player and causing them to violently impact the boards, an illegal action which incurs a penalty.
boards
The vertical barriers that surround and enclose the playing surface, typically a continuous series of walls made of wood to waist height with the remaining height made of glass or plexiglass.
body check
Use of the hip or body to hit an opponent, with the intention of pinning them against the boards, knocking them down to the ice, or otherwise disrupting their ability to control the puck. In men's ice hockey, body checking is a legal action in most contexts but may be penalized if performed excessively or unnecessarily or if it interferes with a player who does not control the puck.
brace
Two goals scored by a single player.
breakaway
A play in which a player has possession of the puck and there are no defenders other than the goalie between the player and the opposing goal.
butterfly
A style of goaltending wherein the goaltender tends to drop to their knees to cover the lower half of the net with their leg pads.
butt-ending
The act of jabbing an opponent with the knob end of a hockey stick, an illegal action which incurs a major penalty plus a game misconduct penalty.

== C ==
cage
A metal grid that attaches to the front of a helmet to protect the face; occasionally also refers to the goal.
captain
A player, typically a veteran or team leader, designated with the authority to speak with officials and linesmen regarding interpretations of the rules, which is generally prohibited for other players. In many professional hockey leagues, including the NHL, each team is permitted one primary captain (indicated by the letter "C" worn on their jersey) and two or three alternate captains (indicated by the letter "A").
catcher

The webbed glove that the goaltender wears on the hand opposite the hand that holds the stick.
centre

A forward position whose primary zone of play is the middle of the ice.
change on the fly
Substituting a player from the bench during live play, i.e. not during a stoppage prior to a faceoff.
charging
The act of taking more than three strides or leaving the ground in order to deliver a body check, an illegal action which incurs a penalty.
cheap shot
A covert, underhanded, and illegal act of violence against another player, often with the intent to injure.
check to the head
A hit in which the primary contact is made with an opponent's head, which in the NHL is an illegal action which incurs a major or match penalty if such a hit is made from a lateral or blind side position. In other leagues and organizations, any check to the head can be a minor or major penalty, often including an automatic misconduct or game misconduct penalty.
checking from behind
The act of hitting an opponent from the back when they are unaware the hit is coming, an illegal action which incurs a penalty.
clipping
Hitting an opponent below the knees, an illegal action which incurs a penalty.
coincidental penalties
The situation that occurs when both teams are assessed an equal number of penalties at the same time, often on the same play or incident, though not necessarily for the same total amount of penalty time.
crashing the net

A strategy in which players attempt to skate to the area directly in front of the goal as quickly as possible, usually with the intention of gaining a rebound or reaching a loose puck before an opposing player can do so.
crease
See goal crease.
cross-checking
The act of checking an opponent with the shaft of the stick held in both hands, an illegal action which incurs a penalty.
cycling
An offensive strategy that moves the puck along the boards in the offensive zone to create a scoring chance by making defenders tired or moving them out of position.

== D ==
dasher
The top of the boards that sits in front of the glass.
defenceman

Either of two players who are positioned further back on the ice than the forwards, with the primary responsibility of clearing the defensive zone in front of their team's goal in order to prevent the opposing team from making offensive plays.
defensive zone
The defending team's zone, extending from the blue line to the boards behind the goal.
deke
When a player handles the puck or their movements in such a manner as to fool the opponent into making an ineffective counter-movement.
dump-and-chase
A method of play intended to penetrate the offensive zone which involves aggressively exerting pressure or forcing scoring chances upon the opposing team by having one player dump the puck into the offensive zone and then quickly pursuing it with other players in the hope of reaching it before the other team and thereby gaining control of the puck near the opposing team's goal.

== E ==
elbowing
The act of using an extended elbow or forearm to make contact with an opponent, an illegal action which incurs a penalty.
empty net goal
A goal scored when the opposing goalie is not on the ice.
enforcer
A player quick to fight who defends their teammates against violent members of the other team.
even strength
The situation that occurs when both teams have an equal number of players (though not necessarily their full complement of five) on the ice at the same time..
extra attacker
A player who has been substituted for their own team's goaltender on the ice, with the intention of maximizing the number of skaters and thus the likelihood of scoring.

== F ==
faceoff
The method used to begin play at the beginning of a period or after a stoppage of play. The two teams line up in opposition to each other. One player from each team attempts to gain control of the puck after it is dropped by an official between their sticks onto a designated faceoff spot on the ice.
faceoff spot
One of nine designated circles painted on the ice where a faceoff may occur. There are two faceoff spots in each attacking and defending zone, two each near the corners of the neutral zone, and one at centre ice.
fighting
The act of two or more players from opposing teams engaging in hand-to-hand combat with each other while on the ice, either during play or after stoppage. Fighting is technically illegal though often tolerated in many leagues, with the combatants each being assessed a major penalty; in some leagues fighting infractions may result in a game misconduct.
five on five
See full strength.
five on four

When a team is short one player due to a penalty being incurred.
five on three

The situation that occurs when one team has two players in the penalty box at the same time while the opposing team has no penalties. This leaves the opposing team with five skaters (not including the goaltender) to the penalized team's three.
five-hole
The gap between a goaltender's legs, or a goal scored when the puck passes through this gap and into the goal.
forecheck
An attempt to gain control of the puck in the offensive zone and set up a scoring opportunity, especially by forward players playing aggressively and attempting to force a takeaway from the opposing team in front of their own net.
freezing the puck
The act by which the goaltender stops and traps the puck in his glove or under his body so that it cannot be played.
full strength
The situation that occurs when both teams have an equal complement of five skaters and one goaltender on the ice at the same time.

== G ==
game misconduct
A type of penalty that results in a player being permanently ejected from the game. For statistical purposes, a player receiving a game misconduct is often credited with 10 or 20 penalty minutes.
goal
When the puck goes over the goal line in front of the net.
goal crease
An area of the ice that extends from the goal line in front of the net, often shaped like a semicircle and painted in a different colour.
goal judge
An off-ice official who signals when a goal has been scored, usually by turning a red light on above the net.
goal line
The line that extents laterally across the ice from the post to the boards in front of each goal, which defines the forward boundary of the goal area. If the puck crosses this line in front of the net and enters the goal area it is ruled as a goal.
goaltender

A player who plays in and around the goal (net), whose job it is to prevent the puck from crossing the goal line and thereby prevent opposing players from scoring.
goon
A type of enforcer who wields violence indiscriminately, disrupting the opposing team at the cost of penalties.
Gordie Howe hat trick
A hat trick in which one player scores a goal, assists another goal, and gets into a fight all in the same game, named for NHL legend Gordie Howe; a "natural" Gordie Howe hat trick occurs when a player does all three in one period.
grinder
A player valued more for hard work and checking skills, especially along the boards, than scoring ability, who often sets up goal opportunities for offensive players.
gross misconduct
A game misconduct penalty for gross unsportsmanlike conduct when a player or coach makes a travesty of the game.

== H ==
hash marks
The straight lines from the faceoff circles in front of both nets. Used to line up faceoffs.
half wall
Midway between the point and the corner along the board.
hand pass
The act of passing the puck using one's hand. This is legal inside a team's defensive zone but illegal if performed in the neutral zone or attacking zone, even if the pass originates from another zone.
hat-trick
When one player scores three goals in one game. Fans will honor the player by throwing their hats onto the ice.
head-butting
The act of deliberately hitting an opponent or directing the puck into the net when leading with one's head. Headbutting an opponent is a penalty, but headbutting the puck into the net results in no goal.
head contact
The intentional or unintentional act of contacting a player above the shoulders with any part of the body or stick. In Canadian minor league hockey this is a minor penalty, or a double minor penalty if the contact is intentional.
healthy scratch
An uninjured player on the roster who does not dress for a game. Only 20 players (22 in international competition) are allowed to dress for a game, players who are not going to play are considered scratches.
high sticking
1. The act of hitting a player in the head or shoulders with a stick, an illegal action which incurs a penalty: usually a single minor if no blood is drawn, and a double minor if blood is drawn.
2. Contacting the puck with a stick that is raised above the shoulders, an illegal action. If the puck is subsequently contacted again by the offending player or a teammate before an opponent touches it, the play is blown dead. A goal scored as a result of a puck being contacted by an attacking player's stick raised above the crossbar shall be disallowed.
hip check
A body check in which a forceful thrust from the hip is used to knock an opponent against the boards or to the ice.
hit
Any body check that "removes the opposing player from the puck."
hockey butt
Slang term for the prominent gluteal muscle development observed in some hockey players.
holding
The act of impeding an opponent by grabbing onto them, an illegal action which incurs a penalty.
holding the stick
The act of grabbing an opponent's stick, an illegal action which incurs a penalty.
home-ice advantage
The ability to make the last line change.
hooking
The act of impeding an opponent by placing the blade of a stick into their body, an illegal action which incurs a penalty.
house
The area in the middle of the defensive zone, directly in front of the goal, from which players often prefer to shoot the puck.
howitzer
A very fast slap shot.

== I ==
ice resurfacer
A vehicle that reconditions ice before play and between periods of a game to smooth out and clean the ice for optimal glide of both puck and skate. The most well-known manufacturer and brand name, Zamboni, has become a genericized term for any ice resurfacer.
icing
The situation which occurs when a player shoots or dumps the puck across both the center red line and the opposing team's goal line without the puck going into the net or being touched by an opposing player in their neutral or defensive zones. If an opposing player is first to touch a puck which has crossed both lines in this way, a linesman immediately stops play. Play is resumed with a faceoff in the defending zone of the team that committed the infraction. In the NHL and many professional leagues, icing can be negated if a player from the team committing the icing touches the puck before a defender, in which case play continues (the linesman nearest the puck will indicate this with a "washout" signal). In many amateur leagues, the "no-touch" icing rule is used, whereby play stops as soon as the puck crosses the goal line. The NHL adopted a rule where the team that committed the infraction is unable to make a line change during the stoppage, so as to discourage teams from icing the puck in order to "get a whistle" which would allow them to change lines; this change has subsequently been adopted by many pro and high-level amateur leagues, but not all. Additionally, most professional and amateur leagues have also adopted a rule whereby play is not stopped if the team committing the icing is shorthanded due to a penalty.
insurance goal
A goal giving a team a two-point lead over the opposing team.
interference
The act of impeding an opponent who does not control the puck, an illegal action which incurs a penalty.

== J ==
j jeads
1. hockey sticks

== K ==
kicking
1. The act of propelling the puck using the skates. A goal may not be scored by kicking a puck into the opposing team's net.
2. The act of kicking an opposing player. A match penalty.
kneeing
The act of making contact with an opposing player when leading with an outstretched knee, an illegal action which incurs a penalty.

== L ==
left wing
A winger whose faceoff position at even strength is on the center's left side. Compare right wing.
left wing lock
A defensive ice hockey strategy similar to the neutral zone trap. In the most basic form, once puck possession changes, the left wing moves back in line with the defensemen. These three defenders then play a zone defense by covering a third of the ice each. Since there are normally only two defensemen, this tactic helps to avoid odd man rushes.
line
A particular combination of players on the same team playing on the ice at the same time, especially those playing the three forward positions (left winger, center, and right winger). Most teams, for the sake of chemistry, maintain specific three-man lines for different situations (first and second lines for scoring, third lines for defensive-oriented grinders, and fourth lines for pests and enforcers). The term may also refer to a combination of two defencemen, or to the full complement of all five skaters together. Lines that play together for multiple seasons have become famous in their own right, e.g. the Russian Five and the French Connection.
line brawl
A series of fights involving most or all players on the ice at the same time.
line change
During play, or after a whistle, a team may choose to substitute their forwards and/or their defencemen, usually in order to keep their players fresh or to match certain players against certain opposing players.
linesman
An official responsible for conducting most faceoffs and for calling offside and icing infractions. Linesmen can also call some penalties. There are usually two linesmen on the ice during a game.
long change
In the second period, the goaltenders change ends, meaning that the players' bench is closer to the offensive zone rather than the defensive zone. The "long change" can be a factor when a tired line is stuck in the defensive zone and cannot come off due to the increased distance to the bench.

== M ==
man advantage
The situation that results when one team is penalized and one of its players is sent to the penalty box, causing the opposing team to have one more player on the ice than the penalized team for the duration of the penalty (major penalty) or until a goal is scored (minor penalty). If two penalties are called on the same team there will be a two-man advantage. If more than two penalties are called on one team the man advantage is limited to two men.
major penalty
A five-minute penalty.
match penalty
A five-minute penalty that includes automatic expulsion from the game and, depending on the league, possibly subsequent games as well. Match penalties are usually called on only the most serious infractions, such as attempts to deliberately injure an opponent, official, or fan.
Michigan

The maneuver of lifting the puck with the stick and throwing it under the top corner of the goal while skating behind the net, while the goaltender protects the bottom corner. Bill Armstrong invented the move, but Mike Legg made it into a permanent sports reel staple while playing for the University of Michigan Using the Michigan in a full-speed variation, Mikael Granlund scored a goal at the 2011 IIHF World Championship semifinal versus Russia, helping Finland progress into the final.
minor penalty
A two-minute penalty.
misconduct
A penalty in which the offending player is ruled off the ice for 10 minutes, but may be substituted with another player on the ice.

== N ==
natural hat-trick
A hat trick in which a player scores three goals successively in one period.
net front presence
An offensive tactic of screening the opposing goaltender, looking to tip shots from farther out, and/or collecting rebounds from the goaltender.
netminder
See goaltender.
neutral zone
The area in the middle of the ice rink, between the blue lines.
neutral zone trap
A defensive strategy focused on preventing the opposing team from proceeding with the puck through the neutral zone (the area between both blue lines) and attempting to take the puck from the opposing team.

== O ==
odd-man rush
The situation that occurs when a team enters the attacking zone and outnumbers the opposing players in the zone.
offensive zone
See attacking zone.
official
A person who regulates game play, either on or off the ice.
offside
When player on the attacking team does not control the puck and is in the offensive zone when a different attacking player causes the puck to enter the offensive zone, until either the puck or all attacking players leave the offensive zone.
one-timer
The act of shooting the puck directly off a pass without playing the puck in any way.
Original Six
The six teams that made up the entire National Hockey League between 1942 and the league's 1967 expansion: the Boston Bruins, Chicago Blackhawks, Detroit Red Wings, Montreal Canadiens, New York Rangers, and Toronto Maple Leafs.
overtime
An extra session of play added on after the full regulation time has concluded in order to resolve a tie. The first team to score in overtime wins the game.
own goal
The act of a team (usually unintentionally) shooting the puck into their own net instead of their opponent's. For statistical purposes, the last player on the opposing team to touch the puck is awarded the goal.

== P ==
paddle
The wide portion above the blade of a goalie's stick.
PairWise Rankings
A ranking system for NCAA Division I men's hockey maintained by the U.S. College Hockey Online website. This system plays a major role in the NCAA tournament selection process.
passive box
A defensive formation that a shorthanded team can use during a penalty kill. Requires four players to form a box in front of their goaltender. The two players closest to the goalie are usually defenders. They prevent the attacking team from scoring from the sides, and from directly in front of the goal. The two players farthest from the goal interfere with attacking defender, and cross-ice passes. All four players remain in front of the net in roughly the same position for the entire duration of the penalty kill, regardless of how the attacking team moves, hence why it is called "passive".
penalty box
The area where a player sits to serve the time of a given penalty.
penalty kill (PK)
The set of defensive tactics employed by a team while shorthanded following a penalty, or the particular line of skaters used during such a situation. Penalty kill strategy generally emphasizes keeping the puck out of the shorthanded team's defensive zone and playing with a deliberately slow pace and conservative movements so as to run out the penalty clock, often at the expense of making offensive plays. Icing is not enforced on the shorthanded team.
penalty shot
A special type of penalty assessed when a defender acts in flagrant violation of a rule in order to prevent a scoring opportunity. Common examples are tripping an opponent who is on a breakaway from behind, throwing a stick, or using the hands to manipulate the puck by a defender other than the goalie. The offensive player is awarded an opportunity to take control of the puck at center ice and challenge the defending goalie one-on-one in an attempt to score.
pest
A player known for agitating opposing players, usually through frequent hitting, sometimes of questionable legality.
playmaker
1. A fast player who usually has more assists than goals. A playmaker has the speed and balance to make plays, and frequently relies on a sniper to finish them.
2. A player who has three assists in one game.
playoff beard
The superstitious practice of a hockey player not shaving off his facial hair during the playoffs, consequently growing a beard.
plus-minus
A hockey statistic that can apply to a player or an offensive or defensive line indicating whether they were on the ice when the opposing team scored (a minus) or on the ice when their team scored (a plus). Goals scored when on a power-play or a penalty kill do not count for a player's plus or minus, respectively, unless a goal is scored while the scoring team is shorthanded.
point
Either of the two positions within the opposing team's defensive zone where the blue line meets the boards. A common offensive strategy involves a pair of defensemen occupying the points and attempting to keep the puck from crossing the blue line back into the neutral zone. Players with good long-range shooting skills such as snipers are also frequently positioned at the points.
poke check
A type of check in which the stick is used to poke the puck away from an opponent.
policeman
A type of enforcer who will hit or fight any opponent seen to be making illegal contact. The policeman's watchfulness and reputation often act as a deterrent against such practices.
pond hockey
A form of outdoor hockey similar to shinny, especially when played on the surface of a naturally frozen body of water such as a pond or lake in the wintertime. A fan might state that a team "looks like they're playing pond hockey" if the players are not displaying the heart or concentration upon the game that their elite professional level demands.
post-game handshake
A handshake between opposing players, who as a traditional show of respect line up parallel to each other at centre ice after a game and proceed to file past each other with each player shaking hands with every player from the opposing team in order. In the NHL, post-game handshakes are usually reserved until the end of a playoff series and are not a normal event during the regular season.
power forward
A large, muscular offensive player, with the mobility to track a puck to the corners of the rink, the physical toughness required to dig it out, and the puck-handling skills to get it back to anyone in front of the net.
power move
The act of using speed and strength to cut to the net. Sometimes done by moving towards the boards before taking a sharp turn towards the net.
power play
The situation that occurs when one team has more players on the ice than the other team as a result of penalties assessed to the shorthanded team.
pull the goalie
To remove the goaltender from the ice in order to temporarily replace them with an extra skater, usually an attacker capable of scoring goals. Pulling the goalie is usually only done as a last resort, when the pulling team is down by only a single goal and the remaining time in the game is nearly expired.

== Q ==
quarterback
Generally, an offensive defenceman who plays one of the points on the power play and is adept at skating and handling the puck.
quick whistle
A stoppage in play that occasionally occurs when an on-ice official view of the puck is obstructed while the puck is still moving or playable, but the official stops the play with a whistle. The most common example of this is a goaltender appearing to have trapped the puck underneath their catcher, yet the puck is still freely moving and within legal striking distance of the opposing players. The official will whistle the play "dead" with the puck still visible to others.

== R ==
rebound
The situation that occurs when the puck bounces off a goalie, a player, or the net (or occasionally, the boards behind the goal line) after a shot on goal.
red line
The line denoting the middle of the ice surface, length-wise.
referee
The official in charge of the game. Responsible for maintaining the flow of the game, calling penalties and starting and stopping play. Can be one or two referees on the ice during a game.
referee's crease
The semi-circular area at the red line and beside the scorer's bench, into which a player may not enter when occupied by a referee during a stoppage of play.
right wing
A winger whose faceoff position at even strength is on the center's right side. Compare left wing.
rink
The playing surface.
roughing
The act of contacting an opponent with the hand or fist when making a punching motion, an illegal action which incurs a penalty.

== S ==
saucer pass
An airborne pass from one player to another. It is called a saucer pass because the puck resembles a flying saucer in mid-air. A pass, barely off the ice but high enough to clear a defender's stick blade.
save
To stop the puck from crossing the goal line, preventing the opposing team from scoring a goal.
scoring chance
An attempt or chance for a team or player to score a goal.
screened shot
A shot that the goaltender cannot see due to other players obscuring it.
shaft
The long part of the stick that is straight and is held by the player.
shift
The period of time a player, line or defensive pairing is on the ice before being replaced by another.
shootout
A series of penalty shots by both teams to determine the winning team after a regulation game and overtime period ends in a tie. In the NHL this occurs only during the regular season. See penalty shot.
shorthanded
A team is said to be shorthanded when they have fewer players on the ice than the opposing team as a result of a penalty or penalties.
shortside
The side of the goal closest to the shooter.
shot on goal
A shot that will enter the goal if it is not stopped by the goaltender. Shots that either hit the side of the net or miss the goal completely do not count as shots on goal, nor do shots that hit a goalpost or crossbar and do not cross the goal line. Similarly, shots that are stopped or otherwise played by the goalie that would not, according to the judgment of the official scorer, have scored are not counted as shots on goal.
shots per 60 minutes
a rate stat that indicates how many shots a team or player takes or allows per 60 minutes of play.
shutdown pair
Two forwards or defensemen working together, fundamentally to stop the opposing team's offense players.
shutdown player
A player skilled at defensive play.
shutout
A game in which the losing team does not score.
Sin-Bin
Another term for penalty box.
skatemill
A device for practising skating techniques.
skater
Any player who is not a goaltender.
slapshot
A slapshot is a hard shot, usually with a big wind up, wherein the player bends their stick on the ice and allows the energy stored in bending the stick to launch the puck forward.
slashing
The act of contacting an opponent's body or stick with one's own as a result of a swinging motion. A penalty.
slew foot
Sweeping or kicking out a player's skate or tripping them from behind, causing them to fall backwards. A match penalty.
slot
The slot is the area on the hockey rink directly in front of the goaltender between the face-off circles on each side.
snap shot
The purpose of the snap shot is to combine the main advantages of the wrist shot (shot accuracy and quick delivery) and the slap shot (puck speed). Unlike a slap shot, there is no backswing windup, and very little follow through.
sniper
A player with a powerful, accurate shot skilled at finishing plays. From the military term of the same name.
spearing
The act of jabbing an opponent with the blade of the stick. A double-minor penalty at minimum.
special teams
A collective term for the players that play on the power play and shorthanded units.
spin-o-rama
A phrase coined by sportscaster Danny Gallivan that refers to a player completing several tight circles with the puck fully under control of their stick, eluding pursuing opponents who cannot keep up or intercept the player. Performing such a maneuver is currently banned during shootouts in the NHL.
stack the pads
A save wherein the goaltender drops to one side and makes the save with their leg pads stacked horizontally atop one another.
standup goalie
A goalie who often stays on their skates when a player shoots, as opposed to a butterfly goalie.
stay-at-home defenseman
A defenseman who plays very defensively. They do not skate with the puck toward the offensive zone very often, but will look to pass first. Usually the last player to leave their defensive zone.
stick
A long stick with a flat blade projection used to play the puck.
stick checking
Using the stick to interfere with an opponent's stick.
stickhandling
The act of controlling the puck with one's stick, especially while maneuvering through opponents.
stickwork
Violent attacks with the stick which are illegal due to the likelihood of serious injury. Includes cross-checking, high-sticking, hooking, slashing, spearing, and instances of tripping involving the stick.
sucker
A player with a reputation for being easily intimidated and particularly for avoiding fights.
suicide pass
A long pass to a moving teammate's feet. This causes the teammate to look down and be open to a devastating body check as the teammate receives the puck.

== T ==
tag up
The act of returning to the neutral zone after a delayed offside is signaled by the linesman.
tap-in
A shot very close to the net that no opposing player or goaltender is able to block/save.
toe drag
Dragging the puck along the ice with the end (toe) of the stick blade on the ice as opposed to pushing with the bottom edge.
toepick
Falling down due to the toe of the skate hitting the ice at a sharp angle.
top shelf
The upper area of the goal, just below the crossbar and above the goaltender's shoulders.
trap

A defensive-style hockey strategy in which a team loads up the neutral zone with players so that the opposing team has a difficult time crossing the blue line and gaining the zone.
trapezoid
The marked trapezoidal area immediately behind the goal line and the goal itself within which the goaltender may touch the puck. A minor penalty (delay of game) is assessed if the goaltender plays the puck behind the goal line outside of the trapezoid. First adopted by the AHL in 2004, with the NHL following suit in 2005, the KHL in 2019, and the IIHF in 2021.
trapper
See catcher.
tripping
The act of knocking an opponent down by taking their feet out from under them using a stick or any part of the body, an illegal action which incurs a penalty.
turnbuckle
The area on both ends of a bench where the edge of the glass is padded and meets the boards at a right angle. Players have been checked into the turnbuckles causing serious injury. The NHL has replaced this with rounded corners as a safer alternative.
two-way forward
A forward who handles the defensive aspects of the game as well as the offensive aspects.

== U ==
umbrella
An offensive strategy used by an attacking team, usually during a powerplay. It requires five players in the offensive zone to form an umbrella formation around the opposite team's goal net. There is one player at the point, one player on either side of the boards and two players in front of the net.
unsportsmanlike
An action of a player that results in a 2-minute minor penalty deemed by the referee to be a minor act not severe enough to warrant a 10-minute misconduct or game misconduct.

== V ==
video goal judge
An off-ice official who reviews a goal by video instant replay.

== W ==
waffle
The goalie's blocker. This term stemmed from the visual appearance of the blocker in the pre-modern ice hockey equipment era (also refer to waffle-boarding).
war room
In the NHL, an office in the Toronto headquarters where games are viewed and reviewed.
wheel
Typically referred to when there is time and space to skate with the puck, sometimes is said to tell someone to skate faster.
wheelhouse
The area immediately at a player's feet and in line with the player's shoulders, which is the optimum puck location for a player to get the most power from a slap shot.
wholesale change
A team may, during play or after a whistle, choose to substitute the forwards or defensemen currently on the ice with other players. A wholesale change occurs when all five players (three forwards and two defensemen) are changed at the same time. See line change.
winger
A forward position whose primary zone of play on the ice is along the outer playing area. A right winger is responsible for the right-hand side of the ice and a left winger is responsible for the left-hand side.
wraparound
When an attacking player controls the puck behind the opposition's net and attempts to score by reaching around the side of the net. Such a move is difficult to defend and may result in a goal.
wrist shot
A shot that involves using arm muscles (especially those in the wrist and forearm) to propel a puck forward from the open-faced, concave part of the blade of a hockey stick.

== Z ==
Zamboni
A popular brand of ice resurfacer (see above).
zone
One of three areas of the ice as divided by the blue lines, either the attacking zone, neutral zone, or defensive zone.

== See also ==
- Ice hockey statistics
