= Penalty shot (ice hockey) =

Penalty in ice hockey

In ice hockey, a penalty shot is a type of penalty awarded when a team loses a clear scoring opportunity on a breakaway because of a foul committed by an opposing player. A player from the non-offending team is given an attempt to score a goal without opposition from any defending players except the goaltender. This is the same type of shot used in a shootout to decide games in some leagues.

== Award ==
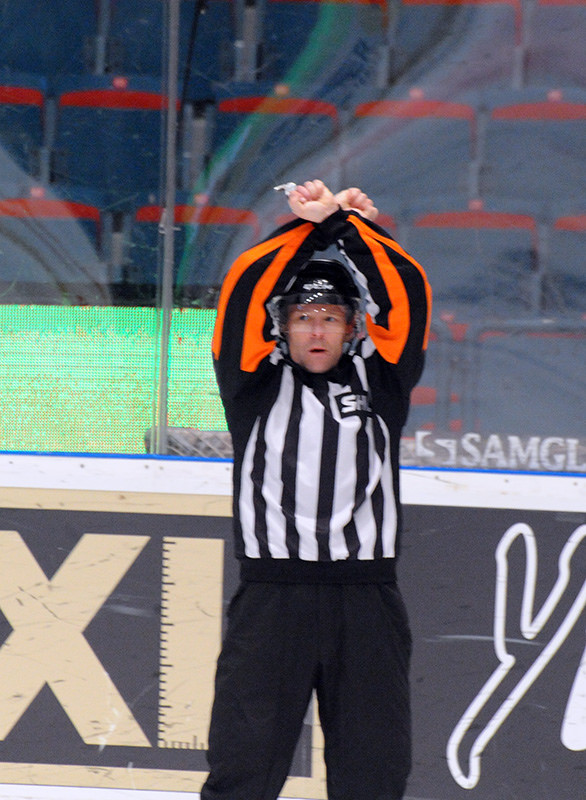
A referee giving the signal for a penalty shot.

A penalty shot is awarded to a player who is deemed to have lost a clear scoring chance on a breakaway by way of a penalty infraction by an opposing player. A breakaway, in this case, means that there are no other players between the would-be shooter and the goaltender of the defending team. Generally, the penalty shot is awarded in lieu of what would normally be a minor penalty, so the fouled team will not get both a penalty shot and a power play from a single infraction, even if they did not score on the former.

According to National Hockey League (NHL) rules, various infractions during a breakaway that can lead to a penalty shot being awarded include a goaltender deliberately dislodging a goal-post (delay of game), a defending player using a stick or any other part of his body to interfere with the attacking player, a goaltender or other player throwing his stick to distract or hinder the attacking player, or any other foul committed against the attacking player from behind. In addition to this, a penalty shot is awarded to the opposing team if a non-goalie player intentionally covers the puck in his own team's goal crease.

In the Southern Professional Hockey League (SPHL), since its inception in 2004, a penalty shot is automatically awarded for a minor penalty in the final two minutes of overtime. This rule was slightly changed prior to the 2008–09 season when the SPHL changed their overtime rules, shortening minor penalties in overtime to one minute. Now any infraction occurring in the final minute of overtime will result in a penalty shot. This rule only applies to regular season games.

Upon observing any of the above scenarios, an official will signal a penalty shot by raising his crossed arms above his head with his fists clenched, and then point to centre ice. In the NHL, officials signal a penalty shot by just pointing to centre ice. A player is then picked to take the shot. This is usually (though not always) the player who was fouled on the preceding play. In some cases, the captain of the attacking team may pick a player from those on the ice at the time of the infraction. Only a goaltender or alternate goaltender may be selected to defend the penalty shot, although the original goaltender usually stays in the net.

According to NHL rules, if an infraction which would usually attract a penalty shot occurs while the defending team's goaltender is off the ice (i.e. an empty net scenario), a goal shall be awarded.

== Procedure ==
Following the announcement of the penalty shot, the official places the puck at centre ice. The identified shooter is allowed to skate a short distance to the puck in order to gain momentum and then, unlike penalty kicks in soccer and penalty strokes in field hockey, the player is allowed to skate with the puck before shooting.

Penalty shot.

All players other than the selected shooter and the selected goaltender must move to either side of the ice surface in front of their respective benches.

If a penalty shot is awarded and the penalized team had pulled their goaltender in favour of an extra attacker, the player fouled is automatically awarded a penalty shot goal, regardless of whether the puck went in.

The goaltender must remain in the crease until the attacking player has gained possession of the puck. After this point they may move out of the crease to gain a better defending position. If the goaltender exits the crease prior to the attacker touching the puck, the official allows the play to continue, and any goal scored stands. If the penalty shot is unsuccessful, however, the puck is returned to centre ice and the shot is re-taken, thus penalizing the goaltender by giving another penalty shot.

During the attempt, the puck must move continuously towards the goal once touched. A goal may not be scored from a rebound off of the goaltender, the goal itself or the end boards (however, a goal can be scored from a shot which strikes the goal frame or the goaltender and then goes into the net as a result). Once the puck crosses the end line, the attempt is considered over, regardless of whether a shot was taken.

The goaltender may attempt to stop the shot using any means, except throwing his stick or any other object. Should the goaltender throw any object during the attempt, a goal is automatically awarded.

If the penalty shot is successful, the puck is placed at center ice and play resumes as normal. If the shot is unsuccessful, the puck is placed at either of the faceoff positions in the zone where the play occurred, and play resumes. The time necessary to complete the penalty shot is not taken off of the game clock.

== Strategy ==
Penalty shot goal

Strategy is considered to be very important during penalty shots and overtime shootouts for both the shooter and the goaltender. Both shooters and goaltenders commonly consult their teammates and coaches for advice on the opposing player's style of play. Shooters often consider the goaltender's strengths and weaknesses (such as a fast glove or stick save), preferred goaltending style (such as butterfly or stand-up) and method of challenging the shooter. Goaltenders often consider the shooter's shot preference, expected angle of attack, a patented move a shooter commonly uses and even handedness of the shooter.

Most shooters attempt to out-deke the goaltender in order to create a better scoring chance. Minnesota Wild forward Mikko Koivu, Detroit Red Wings forward Pavel Datsyuk, Washington Capitals forward T. J. Oshie and New York Rangers forward Martin St. Louis are examples of players who commonly use this strategy. However, it is not uncommon for a shooter to simply shoot for an opening without deking. This is commonly referred to as sniping. This is most commonly performed when a goaltender challenges a shooter by giving them an open hole (by keeping a glove, pad or stick out of position or being out of sound goaltending position altogether to tempt the shooter to aim for the given opening).

Very rarely a shooter may take a slapshot or wrist shot from the point or top of the slot. This is almost exclusively performed when a shooter either has a high level of confidence in their shot or they attempt to catch the goaltender by surprise. Boston Bruins forward Brian Rolston, Minnesota Wild forward Thomas Vanek and Philadelphia Flyers defenseman Chris Pronger have all used this strategy with success. In fact, Pronger succeeded in using this strategy in the 2006 Stanley Cup Finals against Carolina Hurricanes goaltender Cam Ward as a member of the Edmonton Oilers.

Players sometimes use the rarity of point-blank shots as a deking method. Sheldon Souray, owner of one of the hardest slapshots in the NHL, has succeeded by faking a slapshot and simply flipping the puck in. Sometimes a player will even fake a wrist shot by lifting their opposite leg (left leg for a right-handed shooter) or just by flicking their stick directly above the puck. Thomas Vanek also uses this technique.

== History ==
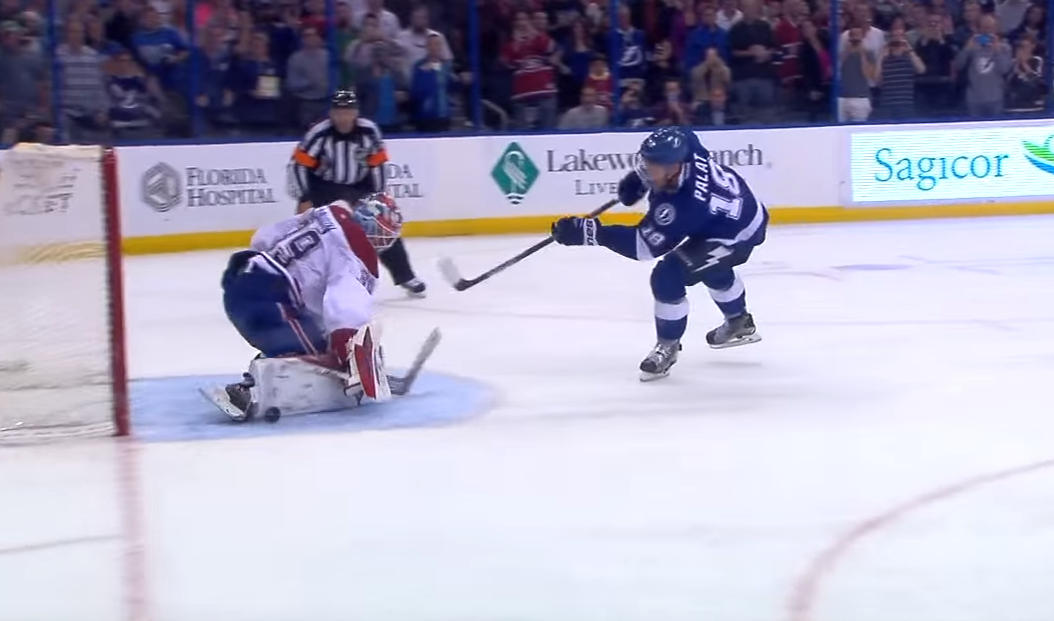
Ondřej Palát of the Tampa Bay Lightning (blue) taking a penalty shot against Mike Condon of the Montreal Canadiens (white).

The penalty shot was invented in the Pacific Coast Hockey Association in the 1921–22 PCHA season. League president Frank Patrick was fed up with deliberate fouls on players with good scoring opportunities and introduced the free shot. The first shot taken was on December 6, 1921, and the first goal was scored on December 12, 1921 by Tom Dunderdale on Hugh Lehman. The shot was taken from one of three dots painted on the ice 35 feet (11 m) from the goal. Players had to skate to the dot and shoot the puck from the dot.

The penalty shot was added to the rule books of the NHL for the 1934–35 season, allowing them to be awarded when a player was fouled while in "a good scoring position." In the first season, the puck was placed in a 10-foot (3.0 m) circle, 38 feet (12 m) from the goalmouth. The player could shoot while stationary within the circle, or could shoot while moving, as long as the shot was taken within the circle. The goaltender had to be stationary until the puck was shot, and no more than 1 foot (0.30 m) in front of the goal mouth.

The first NHL penalty shot was awarded to the Montreal Canadiens' Armand Mondou on November 10, 1934; he was stopped by the Toronto Maple Leafs' George Hainsworth. On November 13, Ralph "Scotty" Bowman of the St. Louis Eagles scored the first penalty shot goal in NHL history. Erik Cole of the Carolina Hurricanes became the first NHL player to attempt two penalty shots in one game playing against the Buffalo Sabres and Martin Biron on November 9, 2005, scoring once. In the Hurricanes' next game Cole was given another penalty shot but missed the net guarded by the Florida Panthers' Roberto Luongo. Cole is one of three NHL players, along with Esa Pirnes (October 10 and October 12, 2003) and Andrew Cole (October 16 and October 18 2023), to have taken penalty shots in consecutive games. There have been three occasions when an NHL team successfully converted on two penalty shots in a single game - first on February 11, 1982 when Thomas Gradin and Ivan Hlinka of the Vancouver Canucks scored on shots against Detroit Red Wings goaltender Gilles Gilbert, second on December 30, 2009 when Ryane Clowe and Joe Thornton of the San Jose Sharks converted penalty shots against Washington Capitals goalie Michal Neuvirth, and most recently on March 19, 2017 when Lukáš Sedlák and Brandon Dubinsky of the Columbus Blue Jackets scored on shots against New Jersey Devils goaltender Cory Schneider. On February 6, 2014 Max Pacioretty of the Montreal Canadiens was the first player to be awarded two penalty shots in the same period, against the Vancouver Canucks. He was unsuccessful on both attempts on Roberto Luongo, but still managed to score a hat trick that night.

The occurrence of a penalty shot being called during regular season overtime in the NHL is a comparative rarity since the institution of a limited, five-minute sudden-death overtime for tie-breaking purposes following the 2000-01 NHL season (the overtime concept for regular season games itself being re-instituted for the 1983-84 season onwards), with only three skaters per side in such a period since the 2015-16 NHL season.

Since then, in Stanley Cup play, 46 penalty shots have been called, and only ten in the Final since the first one in NHL play in 1937. The first eight resulted in no score. The first successful penalty shot in NHL Stanley Cup Finals history occurred on June 5, 2006, when Chris Pronger of the Edmonton Oilers beat Cam Ward of the Carolina Hurricanes, following an illegal covering of the puck by Carolina's Niclas Wallin. As of 2010, the most recent failed attempt occurred in the 2007 Final, when Antoine Vermette of the Ottawa Senators had his shot turned aside by Jean-Sébastien Giguère of the Anaheim Ducks.

For possibly the first time in professional hockey, a player was awarded two penalty shots on the same play. This occurred on Friday, November 27, 2009 in a game from the ECHL league between the Utah Grizzlies and the Alaska Aces. Vladimir Nikiforov of the Utah Grizzlies was pulled down from behind on a breakaway and as the play continued the opposing team knocked the net off of its moorings intentionally. Once the referee stopped play he awarded Nikiforov two shots, with the second being negated if a goal was scored on the first, however the goaltender, Scott Reid stopped both shots. A similar sequence happened in the 2019 World Juniors in a game between Switzerland and Russia, where Swiss forward Marco Lehmann was tripped twice on the same breakaway, resulting in two penalty shots for Switzerland, both of which were missed, by Lehmann and Philipp Kurashev.

== See also ==
- Ice hockey rules
- Shootout
- National Hockey League
- Breakaway (ice hockey)
- Penalty shoot-out (field hockey)

== Bibliography ==
- Boileau, Ron; Wolf, Philip (2000), "The Pacific Coast Hockey Association", in Diamond, Dan (ed.), Total Hockey, Total Sports Pub., pp. 51–54, ISBN 1-892129-85-X
