= Delay of game (ice hockey) =

Ice hockey rule to prevent traditional longevity

Delay of game is a penalty in ice hockey. It results in the offending player spending two minutes in the penalty box. In the NHL, delay of game is usually called under nine circumstances:

1. A player or goaltender intentionally shoots or throws the puck out of the playing area.
2. A defensive player in the defensive zone shoots the puck directly (without being deflected) over the glass. This penalty only applies if the player shoots it over the glass. If the puck is shot into the bench, no penalty is assessed.
3. A player or goaltender intentionally knocks the net's goalpost off its moorings, which stops the play. If the net is intentionally knocked loose during a breakaway, the breakaway player is awarded a penalty shot. If there is not enough time in the game to serve the full delay of game penalty, the last player to take a shot is also awarded a penalty shot.
4. The goaltender freezes the puck rather than passing it on to a teammate when no player on the opposing team is within sufficient distance to apply offensive pressure to them.
5. Any skater other than the goaltender uses their hands to make the puck unplayable (in some leagues, this is called "closing hand on puck").
6. Fans begin to throw objects onto the ice or disrupt the game.
7. Beginning from the 2017–18 NHL season, an unsuccessful coach's challenge for offside results in the challenging team being assessed a bench minor for delay of game.
8. For adjustments to clothing, equipment, skates or sticks. (No delay shall be permitted for the repair or adjustment of goalkeeper’s equipment. If adjustments are required, the goalkeeper shall leave the ice, and a substitute goalkeeper shall take their place immediately).

Delay of game penalties may also be assessed as a bench minor penalty (a minor penalty against the entire team rather than a specific player). These may be called if the team repeatedly engages in actions that postpone resumption of play (for example, being offsides before the faceoff) or if objects are thrown onto the ice that impede the progress of the game - traditional celebratory actions such as the throwing of hats onto the ice after a player records a hat trick are usually exempt from this rule.
