= One-timer =

Ice hockey shot

In this diagram, the blue team is executing a one-timer on a scoring play.

In ice hockey, a one-timer is a shot that occurs when a player meets a teammate's pass with an immediate slapshot, without any attempt to control the puck on their stick. An effective one-timer requires precise timing on the part of both players involved, especially the shooter. This play improves the shooter's chances at scoring a goal. A wrist shot can also be done on a one-timer, though the puck is released far slower than a slapshot one-timer.

The effectiveness of the one-timer comes from three things:

1. The angle from goal between the pass and the shot
2. The change of direction of the puck
3. The speed of the puck after the shot

Greater angle, change of direction and/or speed increases the chances of the puck going into the net. Lesser angle, change of direction and/or speed decreases the chance of the puck going into the net.

Either way, the one-timer enjoys a greater success rate than a one-on-one shot between shooter and goalie.

The reason it is called a one-timer is that the player has only one time to connect.
