= Awarded goal =

Unusual situation in ice hockey

In ice hockey, an awarded goal is an unusual situation in which a goal is awarded to a team rather than scored. A penalty shot is a type of penalty awarded when a team loses a clear scoring opportunity on a breakaway because of a foul committed by an opposing player. The fouled player is given an attempt to score a goal without opposition from any defending players except the goaltender ("goalie"). However, when such a lost opportunity occurs and the opposing team has pulled its goalie to substitute an extra attacker and the puck is in the neutral or attacking zone when the foul occurs, a goal is simply awarded without a penalty shot taking place. The assumption is that, if not for the foul, the goal would have been scored.

In the Deutsche Eishockey Liga and National Hockey League, a goal can also be awarded if the goaltender deliberately knocks the goalpost off its moorings to stop a breakaway.

A goal can also be automatically awarded during a penalty shot or a shootout, if the goaltender attempts to stop the attacker performing the penalty shot in an illegal manner.

On March 12, 2020, both the St. Louis Blues and Anaheim Ducks were awarded a goal at the beginning of the first period to reflect the score of an earlier game which had been suspended due to St. Louis defenseman Jay Bouwmeester's heart attack.

In a May 10, 2026, playoff game, the Montreal Canadiens player Alex Newhook was hooked by Buffalo Sabres defender Rasmus Dahlin while on a breakaway toward an empty net. Because the penalty directly prevented a high-probability goal on an open net, the referees awarded Newhook a goal.

== See also ==
- Goaltending penalty in basketball
- Penalty try in rugby union and rugby league
- Unfair act in gridiron football
