= Cycling (disambiguation) =

Cycling is an activity on a bicycle.

Cycling or Cyclist may also refer to:

- Cycle sport, a competitive physical activity using bicycles
- Cycling (ice hockey), an offensive strategy
- Bicycling (magazine), an American cycling magazine
- Cyclist (magazine), a British magazine
- Biking (song), a 2017 song by Frank Ocean
- The Cyclist, a 1987 Iranian sports-drama film
- Fishless cycling, a form of "maturing" an aquarium
- Cyclist (painting), a 1913 painting by Natalia Goncharova
- Cyclists (film), a 2018 Croatian-French animated short film

== See also ==
- Cycle (disambiguation)
