= Ernst G. Straus =

American-German mathematician

- Born: February 25, 1922; Munich, Germany
- Died: July 12, 1983 (age 61); Los Angeles, California, U.S.
- Citizenship: United States
- Education: Hebrew University; Columbia University
- Known for: Erdős–Straus conjecture Illumination problem Swiss cheese universe
- Scientific career
- Fields: Mathematics
- Doctoral advisor: F. J. Murray
- Other academic advisors: Albert Einstein
- Doctoral students: Aviezri Fraenkel; Daihachiro Sato; Krishnaswami Alladi

Ernst Gabor Straus (February 25, 1922 – July 12, 1983) was a German-American mathematician of Jewish origin who helped found the theories of Euclidean Ramsey theory and of the arithmetic properties of analytic functions. His extensive list of co-authors includes Albert Einstein, Paul Erdős, Richard Bellman, Béla Bollobás, Sarvadaman Chowla, Ronald Graham, Lee Albert Rubel, Mathukumalli V Subbarao, László Lovász, Carl Pomerance, Moshe Goldberg, and George Szekeres.

== Biography ==
Straus was born in Munich, February 25, 1922, the youngest of five children (Isa, Hana, Peter, Gabriella) of a prominent Zionist attorney, Elias (Eli) Straus, and his wife Rahel Straus, a medical doctor and feminist. Ernst Gabor Straus came to be known as a mathematical prodigy from a very young age. Following the death of his father, the family fled the Nazi regime for Palestine in 1933, and Straus was educated at the Hebrew University in Jerusalem. Although he never received an undergraduate degree, Straus began graduate studies at Columbia University in New York, earning a PhD in 1948 under F. J. Murray. In 1944, he became the assistant of Albert Einstein. After a three-year stint at the Institute for Advanced Study, Straus took a position at the University of California, Los Angeles, which he kept for the rest of his life. Straus died July 12, 1983, of heart failure.

Straus's interests ranged widely over his career, beginning with his early work on relativity with Einstein and continuing with deep work in analytic number theory, extremal graph theory, and combinatorics. One of his best known contributions in popular mathematics is the Erdős–Straus conjecture that every number of the form 4/n has a three-term Egyptian fraction.
