= Dump and chase =

Ice hockey strategy

The principle of dump and chase is a method of play in ice hockey to penetrate the enemy zone. This method involves aggressively exerting pressure or forcing scoring chances upon the opposite team. This tactic is used prominently in North American ice hockey leagues. It is important that the teams own players do not run into offside.

Tactically, dump and chase accomplishes a few things. From a defensive standpoint, it moves the puck as far away from the own net as possible. It also removes or decreases the risk of offsides or neutral zone turnovers. Additionally, it advances the attack deep into the enemy zone in the case that an offensive player gains possession of the puck. The tactic may also be used as a way for the attacking play to switch sides from left to right or right to left through a diagonal cross-ice dump-in.

Dump and chase is about the player leading the target crossing the center line and then playing the puck to the back gate so that the puck ricochets off it. As soon as the puck is on the way to the boards, the players of their own team run around the opposing defenders, so that they are the first at the puck and can thus build up attack pressure in the opposing zone. This tactic is mainly used when the opponent has chosen a more defensive strategy. This can be when the opponent is waiting on the opposing blue line in a chain of five or four and wants to intercept or prevent the counterattack.
