= Cycling (ice hockey) =

Ice hockey strategy

In ice hockey, cycling is an offensive strategy that moves the puck along the boards in the offensive zone to create a scoring chance by making defenders tired or moving them out of position.
