= Hockey butt =

Muscle development seen in hockey players

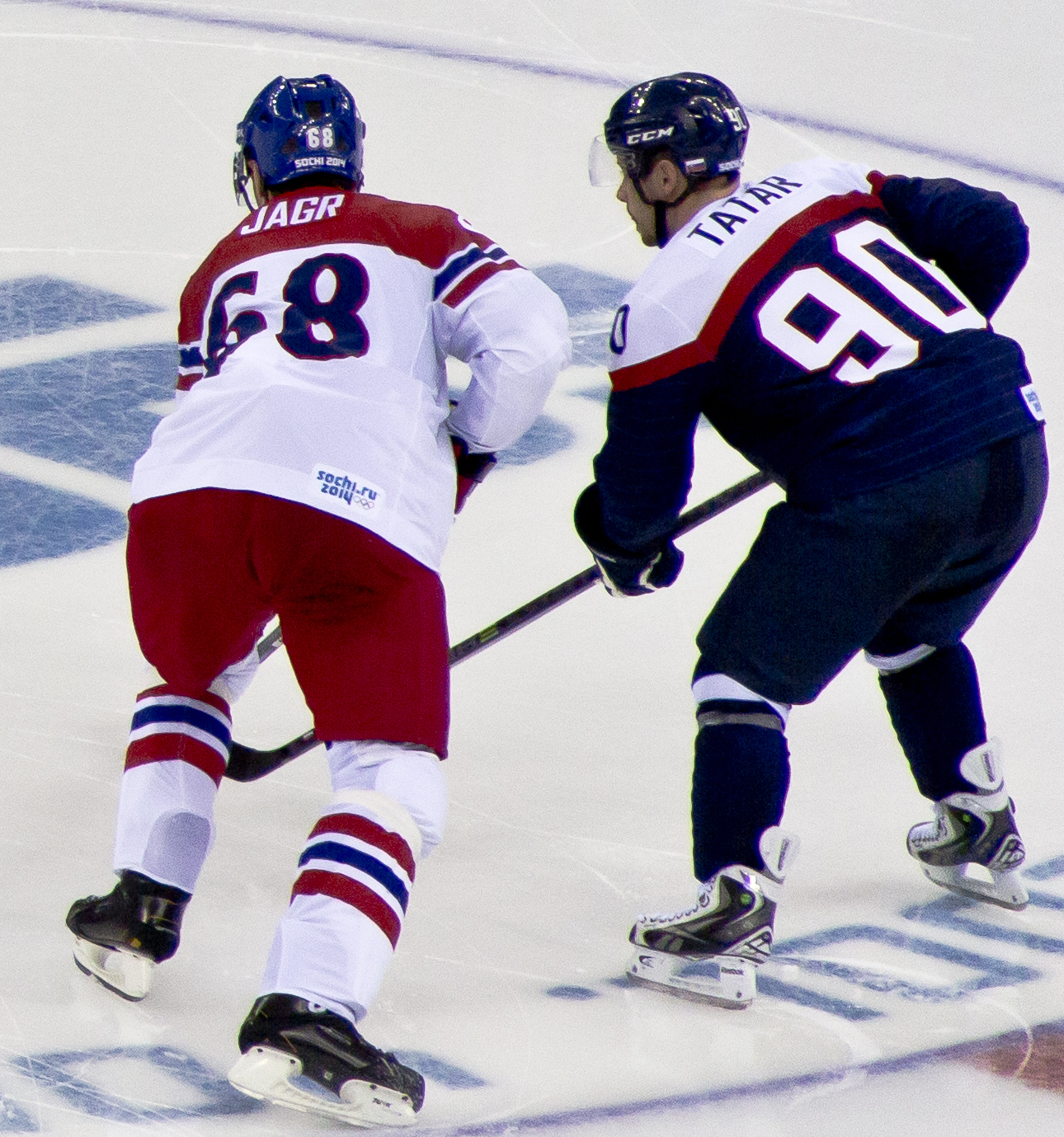
Jaromír Jágr and Tomáš Tatar, ice hockey players with pronounced hockey butts

Hockey butt or hockey ass is a slang term referring to the prominent gluteal muscle development commonly seen in ice hockey players. It typically results from the lower body training and repetitive physical movements associated with hockey and ice skating generally, such as regular squatting and lunging.

== Physiology ==
Ice hockey involves repeated physical motions that significantly engage lower body muscles, with players spending substantial time in a low, squatted stance before pushing off into forceful and agile extensions. This activates the gluteus maximus, quadriceps, hamstrings, and other lower body muscles, which often leads to the development of a body shape distinguished by a narrow waist and prominent, muscular buttocks.

Developed glutes can provide hockey players with tactical advantages: Nick Paumgarten of The New Yorker cited the "long reach and huge rump" of winger Jaromír Jágr as aiding in his ability to shield the puck from defensemen, with defenseman Brian Leetch remarking that Jágr "just backs his way to the net". ESPN hypothesized that the emergence of hockey butts may be a relatively recent phenomenon tied to the evolution of professional athletic training methods that emphasize lower body development, and that the phenomenon can be observed most frequently in professional hockey leagues such as the National Hockey League. Comparable body types have also been noted in other sports with lower body-focused training styles and physical motions, such as alpine skiing, speed skating, and certain forms of weightlifting.

== Cultural impact ==
"This is a real defining characteristic of a hockey player. There's not a guy in here without a hockey ass. They would get a lot of shit if they didn't have one."

— Former professional ice hockey player Mike Knuble, interviewed by ESPN in 2012

Some professional hockey players have reported difficulty finding off-the-rack clothing that fits their body type, which has resulted in multiple apparel companies producing pants specifically designed to accommodate hockey butts. These garments typically feature extra room in the thighs and buttocks, and/or incorporate stretch fabrics such as spandex.

Canadian apparel company GongShow is reported to be the first to produce pants specifically designed for hockey butts in 2012, and later partnered with the Canadian Women's Hockey League on a line of jeans designed for female hockey players. In 2019, an advertisement for athleticwear company State & Liberty featuring Detroit Red Wings player Dylan Larkin promoting their trousers designed for hockey butts went viral online. By 2026, changing fashion trends towards looser-fitting clothing combined with relaxed NHL dress codes that no longer obligate players to dress in formal wear were reported as reducing the difficulty of finding apparel that accommodate hockey butts.

Hockey butts are often referenced in hockey-themed erotic fiction and fanfiction.

== See also ==
- Glossary of ice hockey terms
- Heated Rivalry
