= Breakaway (ice hockey) =

Situation in ice hockey

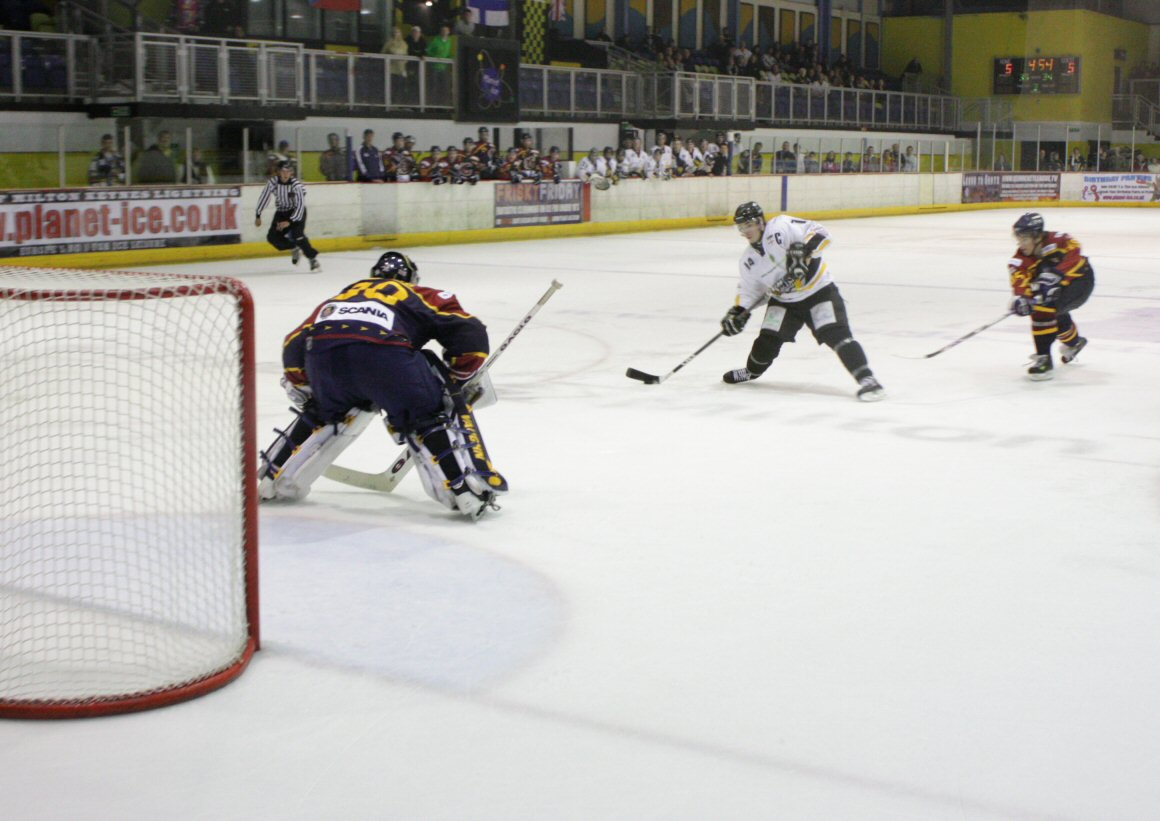
Breakaway during a game between the Guildford Flames and the Milton Keynes Lightning

A breakaway is a situation in ice hockey in which a player with the puck has no defending players except for the goaltender between them and the opposing goal, so they are free to skate in and shoot at will (before the out-of-position defenders can catch up). A breakaway is considered a lapse on the part of the defending team. If a player's progress is illegally impeded by an opposing player or if the goalie's stick is thrown forward, the breakaway player is awarded a penalty shot. If a player faces an empty net (i.e., the opposing team has pulled their goalie) and is illegally impeded by an opposing player, they are automatically awarded a goal instead of taking a penalty shot.
