= Scoring chance =

In ice hockey, an attempt or chance for a team or holder of the puck to score a goal

A scoring chance, in ice hockey is an attempt or chance for a team or holder of the puck to score a goal.

While there is no exact definition of a scoring chance, the Elias Sports Bureau, who is the official statistics recorder of the National Hockey League and many other professional sports leagues, clarifies a scoring chance as an attempt or shot taken from a "home-plate shaped area" that goes from the top of the faceoff circles, through the faceoff dots, then angled to the goal posts. Another possible definition of a scoring chance can be any shot that is taken by an attacking team on an odd man rush, such as a 2-on-1 or 3-on-2 break.

A reason many box scores and stat sheets list the number of scoring chances is to differentiate between shots that are relatively easy saves for the goaltender (shots that are not scoring chances) and shots that are not easy saves (shots that are also scoring chances).
