= Daihachiro Sato =

Japanese mathematician

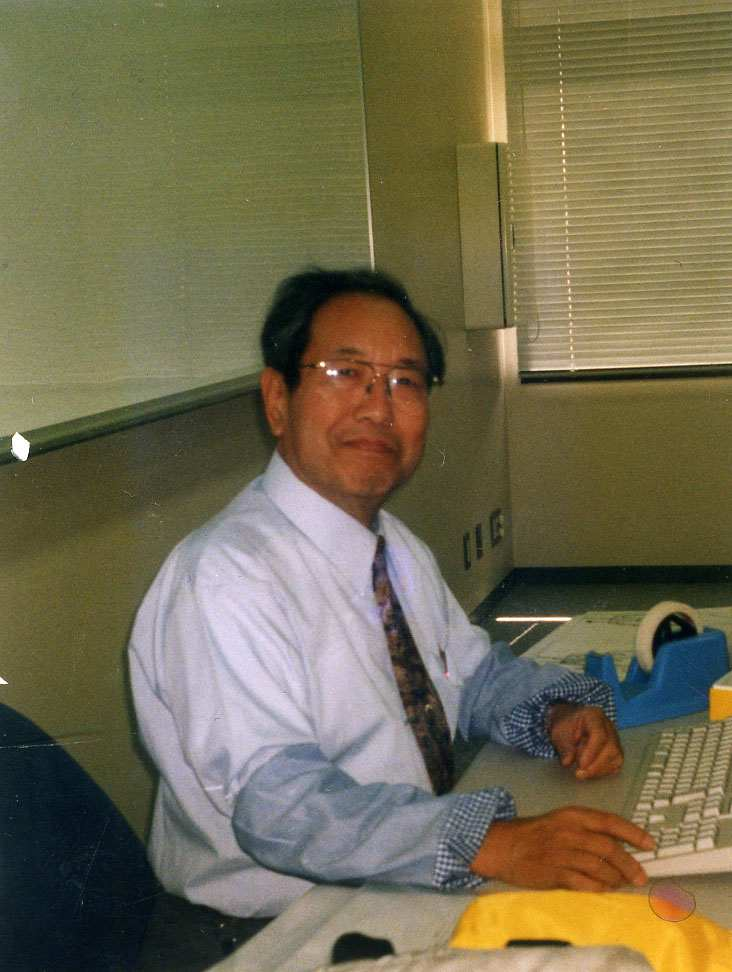
- Daihachiro Sato (1932-2008)
- Born: 佐藤大八郎 (Satō Daihachirō); June 1, 1932; Fujinomiya, Shizuoka, Japan
- Died: May 28, 2008 (age 75); Ladner, British Columbia, Canada
- Citizenship: Japanese
- Education: Tokyo University of Education; University of California, Los Angeles
- Known for: Diophantine Representation of Prime Numbers
- Scientific career
- Fields: Mathematician
- Workplaces: University of Regina; Tokyo University of Social Welfare
- Doctoral advisor: Ernst G. Straus

Daihachiro Sato (佐藤 大八郎, Satō Daihachirō; June 1, 1932 – May 28, 2008) was a Japanese mathematician who was awarded the Lester R. Ford Award in 1976 for his work in number theory, specifically on his work in the Diophantine representation of prime numbers. His doctoral supervisor at the University of California, Los Angeles was Ernst G. Straus.

== Biography ==
Sato was an only child born in Fujinomiya, Shizuoka, Japan on June 1, 1932. While still attending high school, Sato published his first mathematics research paper, which led to his acceptance at the Tokyo University of Education. There, Sato earned a B.S. in theoretical physics, a popular academic field at the time due to the recent Nobel Prize in Physics awarded in 1949 to Hideki Yukawa. Later, in 1965, Shin'ichirō Tomonaga, one of Dr. Sato's professors at this university, was also awarded a Nobel Prize in Physics.

Following his undergraduate degree in Japan, he switched his studies to mathematics, earning a M.Sc. and a Ph.D. from UCLA, and eventually became tenured at the University of Saskatchewan, Regina campus in Regina, Saskatchewan, Canada. Following his retirement in 1997 he was granted the position Professor Emeritus at the University of Regina which is what the Regina campus became in 1974. Subsequently, he further taught at the Tokyo University of Social Welfare from 2000 until 2006, after which he returned to Canada. He died at Ladner, British Columbia on May 28, 2008.

Sato's interests included integer valued entire functions, generalized interpolation by analytic functions, prime representing functions, and function theory. It is in the field of prime representing functions that Sato co-authored a paper with James P. Jones, Hideo Wada, and Douglas Wiens entitled "Diophantine Representation of the Set of Prime Numbers", which won them the Lester R. Ford Award in Mathematics in 1976.

== Publications ==
- 米田, 信夫; 玉河, 恒夫 (1954). "Mondai to kaito" [Mathematical problem and solutions]. SUGAKU (in Japanese). 6 (3): 190–192. doi:10.11429/sugaku1947.6.190.
- 増山, 元三郎 (1961). "Mondai to kaito" [Mathematical problem and solutions]. SUGAKU (in Japanese). 13 (2): 125–128. doi:10.11429/sugaku1947.13.125.
- Integer valued entire functions. Los Angeles: University of California, Los Angeles. 1961. OCLC 9432394. —Dissertation: Ph.D.
- 佐藤, 大八郎 (1962). "Mondai to kaito" [Mathematical problem and solutions]. SUGAKU (in Japanese). 14 (2): 95–98. doi:10.11429/sugaku1947.14.95.
- 佐藤, 大八郎 (1962). "Mondai to kaito" [Mathematical problem and solutions]. SUGAKU (in Japanese). 14 (2): 99–108. doi:10.11429/sugaku1947.14.99.
- 佐藤, 大八郎 (1963). "Mondai to kaito" [Mathematical problem and solutions]. SUGAKU (in Japanese). 15 (2): 101–105. doi:10.11429/sugaku1947.15.101.
- 佐藤, 大八郎 (1972). "Mondai to kaito" [Mathematical problem and solutions]. SUGAKU (in Japanese). 24 (3): 223–226. doi:10.11429/sugaku1947.24.223.
- 三井, 孝美 (1975). "Mondai to kaito" [Mathematical problem and solutions]. SUGAKU (in Japanese). 27 (1): 7–11. doi:10.11429/sugaku1947.27.7.
- Hitotumatu, Sin; Sato, Daihachiro (1976). "Simple proof that a p-adic Pascal's triangle is 120° rotatable". Proceedings of the American Mathematical Society. 59 (2): 406–407. doi:10.1090/S0002-9939-1976-0409325-3. eISSN 1088-6826. OCLC 5581281229. S2CID 119816980. — MathSciNet review: 0409325
- Sato, Daihachiro; Hitotsumatcu, Shin (December 1979). "$x^x・y^y=z^z$の整数解について (実験整数論)" (PDF). 数理解析研究所講究録 [Journal of Research Institute for Mathematical Sciences]. Research Institute for Mathematical Sciences, Kyoto University: 106–116. ISSN 1880-2818. OCLC 996633781 – via JAIRO.
- Sato, Daihachiro (1985). "Utterly integer valued entire functions. I." Pacific Journal of Mathematics. 118 (2): 523–530. doi:10.2140/pjm.1985.118.523 – via MathSciNet.
- Ando, Shiro; Sato, Daihachiro (1999). Howard, Fredric T (ed.). On the Generalized Binomial Coefficients Defined by Strong Divisibility Sequences. Applications of Fibonacci Numbers : Volume 8. Dordrecht: Springer Netherlands. OCLC 905439788.
