= Shot (ice hockey) =

Attempt to score a goal in ice hockey

A shot in ice hockey is an attempt by a player to score a goal by striking or snapping the puck with their stick in the direction of the net.

Bryan Rust (far right) attempts a shot, to try scoring a goal past goaltender Braden Holtby

== Statistical definition ==
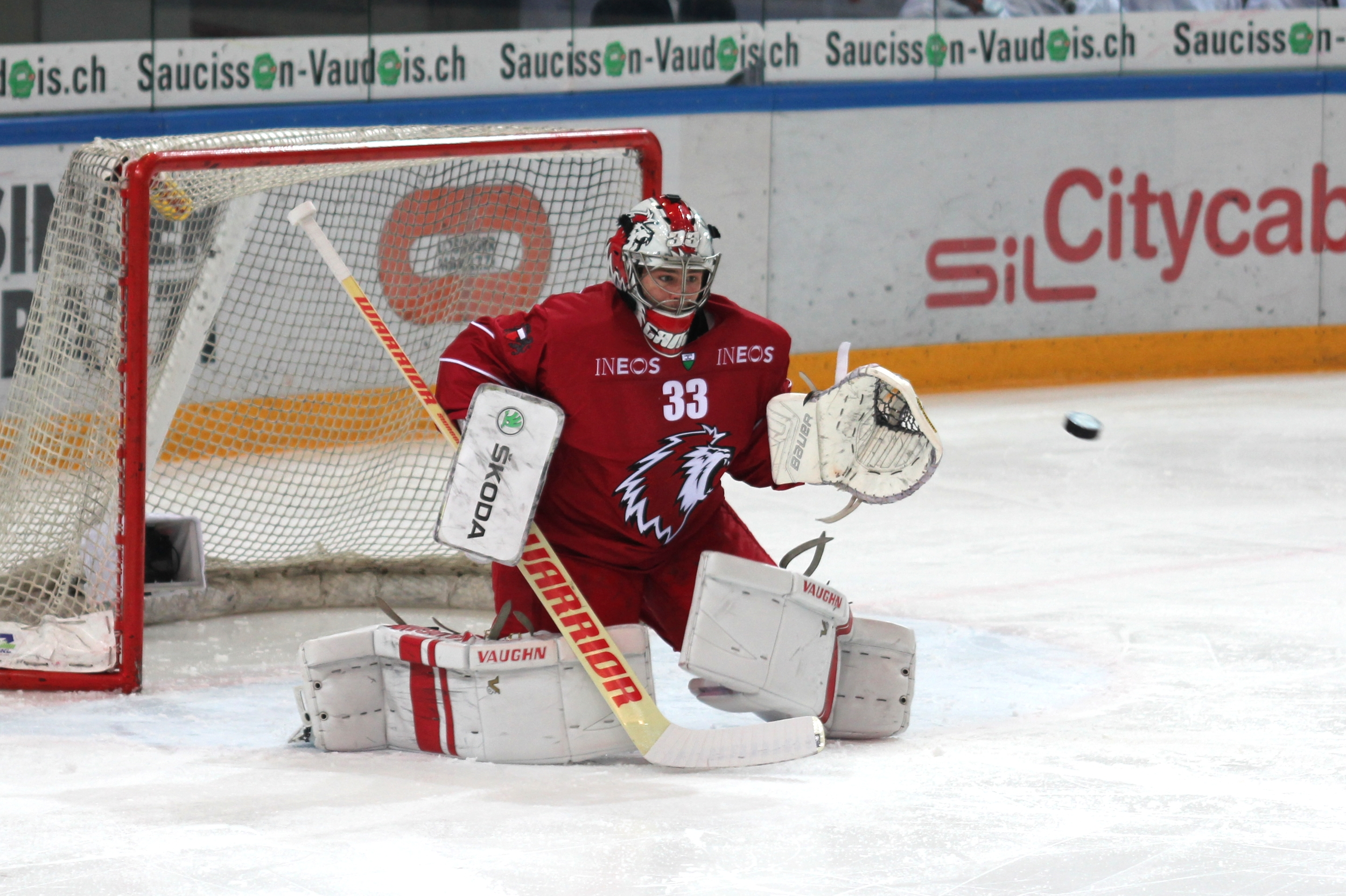
Goaltender Pascal Caminada defending a shot on goal

A shot on goal is a scoring attempt. A count of how many shots are taken by a team is kept and this is often used as rough guide to which team is being more aggressive and dominant. A scoring attempt in hockey (as opposed to soccer) is officially counted as a shot only when it is directed on goal, resulting in a goal or requiring the goaltender to make a save. The numbers of shots and saves in a game are especially relevant to goaltenders, whose save percentage is based on how many shots did not get past them. The number of shots taken by skaters and the percentage on which they score is also measured, but these numbers are generally given less weight. Some shots on goal are considered more likely to result in a goal and are called scoring chances.

== Types ==
There are five basic types of shots in ice hockey.

=== Shovel ===
The shovel shot (also referred to as a flip shot) is the simplest and most basic shot in a shooter's arsenal. Its execution is simply a shoveling motion to push the puck in the desired direction, or a flick of the puck (be it on the forehand, backhand, or in a spearing motion). Players typically resort to shoveling the puck to push loose pucks past a sprawling, or out-of-position goaltender.

=== Wrist ===
The wrist shot is executed by positioning the puck toward the heel-middle of the blade. From that position the shooter rolls their back wrist quickly, while thrusting the puck forward with the bottom hand. As the blade propels the puck forward the movement of the wrist rolls the puck toward the end of the blade, causing the puck to spin. The tightness of the spin of the puck has an effect much like the spin a quarterback puts on their football pass, resulting in more accuracy. The puck is aimed with the follow-through of the shot, and will typically fly perfectly in the direction of the extension of the stick, resulting in an extremely accurate shot. At the same time, the stick flexes, so the moment the puck is released from the stick, the snap of the stick will propel the puck forward at high speeds. Current and former NHL players known for their wrist-shot include Joe Sakic, Alexander Ovechkin, Ilya Kovalchuk, Connor McDavid, Marián Gáborík, Jeff Carter, Evgeni Malkin, Jack Eichel, Teemu Selänne, Alexei Kovalev, Pavel Datsyuk, Phil Kessel, Wayne Gretzky, Steven Stamkos, Nikita Kucherov, Peter Forsberg, Artemi Panarin, Kirill Kaprizov, Markus Näslund, Nathan MacKinnon and Vladimir Tarasenko.

=== Snap ===
The snap shot is a combination of both the slapshot and the wrist shot. The shooter begins by cocking the stick back like a slapshot (usually less far), and finishes with a flicking of the wrist like a wrist shot. The resulting shot has more speed than a wrist shot, while increasing the time it takes to release the shot, balancing its effectiveness. Current and former players noted for their snap-shot include Joe Sakic, Ilya Kovalchuk, Phil Kessel, Thomas Vanek, Nathan Horton, Kirill Kaprizov, Anže Kopitar, Vincent Lecavalier, Alexander Ovechkin, Mike Bossy, Evgeni Malkin, Connor McDavid and Dany Heatley. Many consider Joe Sakic to be the father of the modern snapshot, as he demonstrated incredible scoring ability while utilizing this quick-release shot throughout his career. He much preferred it to the wrist shot, which he was less known for. During his career, Phil Kessel has perfected a variation of the snap shot where the player transfers their weight to their "puck foot", or "back foot", and shoot in stride. He has used this to become one of the NHL's most dangerous shooters.

=== Slap ===
The slapshot is the hardest, yet most telegraphed, shot. The player draws their stick back away from the puck, then forcefully brings it forward to strike the ice two to seven inches behind the puck. This causes energy to be stored in the stick as it flexes against the ice. When the stick finally contacts the puck, the energy stored in the stick is transferred to the puck, providing additional force that would not otherwise be possible by hitting the puck directly. The height and positioning of the follow-through determines the trajectory of the puck. Current and former NHL players known for their slapshot include Bernard "Boom Boom" Geoffrion, Al MacInnis, Zdeno Chára, Daniel Alfredsson, Ilya Kovalchuk, Dustin Byfuglien, Alexander Ovechkin, Shea Weber, Sami Salo, Mario Lemieux, Guy Lafleur, Christian Ehrhoff, Brian Rolston, Evgeni Malkin, Sheldon Souray, P. K. Subban, Nikita Kucherov, Steven Stamkos, Al Iafrate, Ray Bourque, Bernie Federko and Jason Garrison.

=== Backhand ===
The backhand shot is a wrist shot released from the back of the blade, and on the player's backhand. This shot is not as powerful or accurate as any of the other shots, but often comes unexpectedly. They are primarily taken close to the goal, most commonly on breakaways. Slapshots can also be backhanded. Players known for their backhanders include Jyrki Lumme, Joe Sakic, Sidney Crosby, Evgeni Malkin, Marián Hossa, Milan Hejduk, Patrick Marleau, Mike Richards, Mats Sundin, Pavel Datsyuk, Paul Stastny, Henrik Zetterberg, Derek Roy, Claude Giroux and Daniel Brière.

=== Other ===
==== One-timer ====
The one-timer can be any of the above shots, when fired in a continuous motion. One player passes the puck to another, and while the pass is incoming the player chooses not to stop the puck, instead firing it as it reaches the shooter. This is the lowest accuracy shot, but makes up for it in the difficulty it creates for a goaltender to properly position himself to defend against it. Due to the elasticity of the rubber (albeit frozen) puck, it can also generate significantly more energy, giving it more speed and faster elevation. When executed as a slapshot (also called a one-time-slapshot) and finding its way into the goal, it is often known as a "goal-scorers goal" due to the difficulty of the timing and placement of the shot. Current and NHL players known for their one-timers include Leon Draisaitl, Steven Stamkos, Alexander Ovechkin, Ilya Kovalchuk, Nikita Kucherov, Brent Burns, Shea Weber, Brett Hull, P. K. Subban, Evgeni Malkin, Artemi Panarin and Patrik Laine.

==== Deke ====
A deke, short for "decoy", is a feint, a shot, or both, intended to confound a defender. Many players, such as Connor McDavid, Pavel Datsyuk, Mario Lemieux, Wayne Gretzky, Evgeni Malkin, Bobby Orr, Gilbert Perreault, Bobby Ryan, Alexei Kovalev, John Tavares, Rick Nash, Artemi Panarin, Denis Savard, Jaromír Jágr, Joe Sakic, Nikita Kucherov, Pavel Bure, Mikael Granlund, Johnny Gaudreau and Patrick Kane have picked up the skill of "dangling", which is more fancy deking and requires more stick handling skills.

==== Michigan ====
The Michigan, otherwise known as a Lacrosse style goal or the Zorro, can be considered as a special type of deke. It involves a player flipping the puck on the blade of the stick and then whipping the puck while carrying it on the blade. The shot is rarely witnessed due to its requirement for refined stickhandling skills and vulnerabilities for defensive maneuvers. Advantages of this shot are an element of surprise and capacity to position the puck accurately into the top corner from odd angles. Consequently, the Michigan shot is usually attempted from behind the net by surprising a goaltender from a blindside while using the net as a cover from defense. The shot was first used in 1996 NCAA Tournament by a Michigan player Mike Legg, though the invention of the maneuver has been credited to Bill Armstrong. The Michigan has grown in popularity, and began to be attempted by NHL players in the mid-to-late 2010s. The shot has been attempted by players such as Sidney Crosby, Mikael Granlund, Ryan Getzlaf, Tyler Ennis, Miks Indrašis, Evgeny Kuznetsov, Viktor Arvidsson, Claude Giroux, Patrik Laine, Auston Matthews and Trevor Zegras. The first and second successful Michigan goals in the NHL were both by Andrei Svechnikov. Filip Forsberg, Kent Johnson, Trevor Zegras, and Connor Bedard (as a rookie) have also been successful with Michigan attempts.

==== Tip ====
Tipping the puck involves positioning oneself in the vicinity of the net and redirecting an incoming shot with, generally, the blade of the stick. The shaft of the stick and even body parts (legs, posterior, chest, back, even head and face) may also alter the trajectory of the puck and result in a valid goal, although scoring this way generally involves as much chance as deliberate effort. Tips careening off an offensive player's skate will count if no deliberate kicking motion was made. At close distance a well-directed tip that maintains some modicum of speed will pass by the goalie and into the net without the keeper having any possibility to react to the change in direction. Tipping the puck is a very common way to score a goal in today's NHL, and all teams use it frequently.

== Handedness ==
A player's handedness is determined by which side of their body they hold their stick. A player who shoots left (alternatively called a left-handed shot) holds the stick such that the blade is (normally) to the left of their body, with the left hand on the bottom and the right hand on top; a player who shoots right (a right-handed shot) holds the stick such that the blade is to their right, with the right hand at the bottom and left hand on top. The bottom hand delivers most of the power while the top hand is responsible for control and stickhandling, as well as the "whip" of shots. Of the 852 players who skated in the 2007–08 NHL regular season, 554 of 852 (65%) shoot left. Many natural right handed players shoot left and vice versa. This is because, if someone is naturally right handed, they may shoot left, as the top hand (right hand on a lefty stick) controls most of the stick's action.
