= Skatemill =

Machine to improve skating techniques

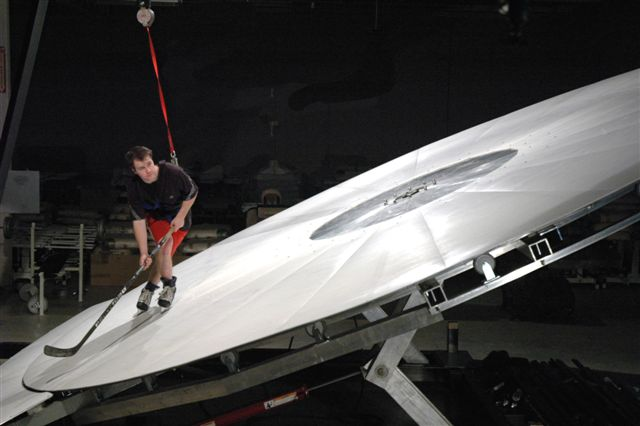
The crossover flywheel

A skatemill is a practice machine for professional ice hockey players to improve their skating techniques, which is very important to achieve the level of skating ability to play on an NHL team.

Skatemills resemble standard runners' treadmills, but wider, longer, and rather than a gripping rubber belt, skatemills have specially designed surfaces that allow players to practice skating techniques on a surface that resembles ice. Skatemills have variable speeds, usually topping out at between 20 and 30 miles per hour, and can also be set to varying inclines to add to the difficulty for the person training. Often, skatemills will include handgrips and a harness system to keep the players from falling while on the skatemill.

Skatemills are currently only commonly found in the training facilities of NHL teams; for example, there is a skatemill in Vancouver for the players of the Vancouver Canucks, and one in Troy, Michigan for the benefit of the Detroit Red Wings. The skatemill has yet to be introduced widely to European hockey players.

Skatemills are becoming very common in hockey training centers on North America as well as in fitness centers. Some companies have created low profile commercial fitness models. These models can be found in fitness centers and gyms around North America.

As of today there are more than 100 skating treadmills around the world.
