= Moshe Goldberg =

Israeli mathematician

- משה גולדברג
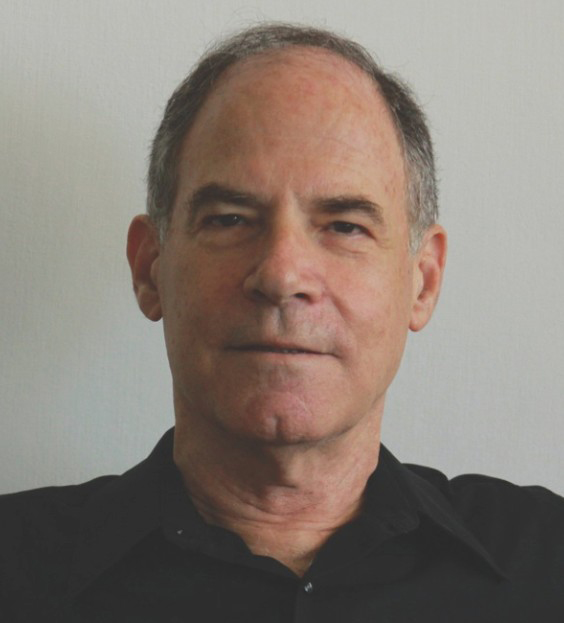
- Moshe Goldberg
- Born: March 23, 1945 (age 81); Tel Aviv, Israel
- Scientific career
- Education: Tel Aviv University
- Fields: Mathematics, Applied Mathematics
- Workplaces: UCLA (1974–1979), Technion – Israel Institute of Technology (1979–present)

Moshe Goldberg (Hebrew: משה גולדברג; born 1945) is an Israeli mathematician. He is a professor emeritus of mathematics at the Technion – Israel Institute of Technology.

== Early life ==
Moshe Goldberg was born and raised in Tel Aviv. His parents, Gad and Rachel Raya Goldberg, immigrated from Poland and Lithuania to Palestine shortly after Hitler became Germany's chancellor in 1933. After completing his undergraduate studies, Goldberg served in the Israel Defense Forces for three years. Released at the rank of captain, he resumed his studies, earning his Ph.D. from Tel Aviv University in 1973 under the supervision of Saul Abarbanel.

== Academic career ==
After a postdoctoral position at the University of California, Los Angeles (UCLA), Goldberg joined the Technion – Israel Institute of Technology in 1979, and in due course became the Ruth and Samuel Jaffe Professor of Mathematics.

Goldberg began his scientific career in computational fluid dynamics. He then turned to other topics, including numerical analysis of hyperbolic and parabolic partial differential systems, linear and Multilinear algebra, matrix and operator theory, functional analysis, and various types of algebras.

He held visiting positions at California Institute of Technology (Caltech), UCLA, University of California Santa Barbara, and Université Paris Dauphine (Paris 9).

Goldberg published over 80 research papers. In 2013 he retired as professor emeritus.
