= Embedded lens =

An embedded lens is a gravitational lens that consists of a concentration of mass enclosed by (embedded in) a relative void in the surrounding distribution of matter: both the mass and the presence of a void surrounding it will affect the path of light passing through the vicinity. This is in contrast with the simpler, more familiar gravitational lens effect, in which there is no surrounding void. While any shape and arrangement of increased and decreased mass densities will cause gravitational lensing, an ideal embedded lens would be spherical and have an internal mass density matching that of the surrounding region of space. The gravitational influence of an embedded lens differs from that of a simple gravitational lens: light rays will be bent by different angles and embedded lenses of a cosmologically significant scale would affect the spatial evolution (expansion) of the universe.

In a region of homogeneous density, a spherical embedded lens would correspond to the symmetric concentration of a spherical locality's mass into a smaller sphere (or a point) at its center. For a cosmological lens, if the universe has a non-vanishing cosmological constant Λ, then Λ is required to be the same inside and outside of the void. The metric describing the geometry within the void can be Schwarzschild or Kottler depending on whether there is a non-zero cosmological constant.

Embedding a lens effectively reduces the gravitational potential's range, i.e., partially shields the lensing potential produced by the lens mass condensation. For example, a light ray grazing the boundary of a Kottler/Schwarzschild void will not be bent by the lens mass condensation (i.e., does not feel the gravitational potential of the embedded lens) and travels along a straight line path in a flat background universe.

== Properties ==
In order to be an analytical solution of the Einstein's field equation, the embedded lens has to satisfy the following conditions:

1. The mass of the embedded lens (point mass or distributed), should be the same as that from the removed sphere.
2. The mass distribution within the void should be spherically symmetric.
3. The cosmological constant should be the same inside and outside of the embedded lens.

== History ==
A universe with inhomogeneities (galaxies, clusters of galaxies, large voids, etc.) represented by spherical voids containing mass condensations described as above is called a Swiss Cheese Universe. The concept of Swiss Cheese Universe was first invented by Einstein and Straus in 1945. Swiss Cheese model has been used extensively to model inhomogeneities in the Universe. For an example, effects of large scale inhomogeneities (such as superclusters) on the observed anisotropy of the temperatures of cosmic microwave background radiation (CMB) was investigated by Rees and Sciama in 1968 using Swiss cheese model (the so-called Rees-Sciama effect). Distance redshift relation in Swiss cheese universe has been investigated by Ronald Kantowski in 1969, and Dyer & Roeder in the 1970s. The gravitational lensing theory for a single embedded point mass lens in flat pressure-less Friedman-Lemaître-Robertson-Walker (FLRW) background universe with non-zero cosmological constant has been built by Ronald Kantowski, Bin Chen, and Xinyu Dai in a series papers.

== Embedded Lens vs. Classical Gravitational Lens ==
The key difference between an embedded lens and a traditional lens is that the mass of a standard lens contributes to the mean of the cosmological density, whereas that of an embedded lens does not. Consequently, the gravitational potential of an embedded lens has a finite range, i.e., there is no lensing effect outside of the void. This is different from a standard lens where the gravitational potential of the lens has an infinite range.

As a consequence of embedding, the bending angle, lens equation, image amplification, image shear, and time delay between multiple images of an embedded lens are all different from those of a standard linearized lens. For example, the potential part of the time delay between image pairs, and the weak lensing shear of embedded lens can differ from the standard gravitational lensing theory by more than a few percents.

For an embedded point mass lens, the lens equation to the lowest order can be written

$\theta_S = \theta_I - \frac{\theta_E^2}{\theta_I}\left[\sqrt{1-(\theta_I/\theta_M)^2}\right]^3$

where $\theta_E$ is the Einstein ring of the standard point mass lens, and $\theta_M$ is the angular size of the embedded lens. This can be compared with the standard Schwarzschild lens equation

$\theta_S = \theta_I - \frac{\theta_E^2}{\theta_I}$
