= Snap shot (ice hockey) =

Wrist shot in ice hockey

A snap shot is an abbreviated wrist shot in ice hockey.

The purpose of the snap shot is to combine the main advantages of the wrist shot (shot accuracy and quick delivery) and slap shot (puck speed).

The snap shot is accomplished with a quick snap of the wrists while the puck rests in place. The difference between a snap shot and a wrist shot is that the stick blade is accelerated towards the puck from a small distance behind it. This allows the player to flex the shaft on the ice and strike the puck at speed – although not to the degree of a full slap shot. The stick is usually not lifted higher than the knee during the shot, which makes this shot legal in most old-timer hockey leagues despite its rapid pace. Snap shots are the most common shot taken when the crease player receives the pass and decides not to one-time the puck.

The snap shot is often considered a compromise between the wrist shot and slap shot, and can sometimes be mistaken for one or the other due to its inherently deceptive nature. Consequently, while many players are renowned for their wrist shots (e.g. Alexei Kovalev, Joe Sakic, Teemu Selänne, Pavel Bure, Paul Kariya) or slap shots (heavy claps) (e.g. Zdeno Chára, Al MacInnis, Bobby Hull, Brett Hull, Shea Weber, Sheldon Souray), few players are known for exceptional snap shots. Among the players who often score on snap shots are Joe Sakic, Teemu Selänne, Steven Stamkos, Alexander Ovechkin, Ilya Kovalchuk and Phil Kessel.
