= Wrist shot =

Ice hockey shot

A wrist shot is a type of hockey shot that involves using arm muscles (especially those in the wrist and forearm) to propel a puck forward from the concave side of the blade of a hockey stick. Generally, when the puck is shot in a similar manner using the convex side of the blade, it is referred to as a backhand shot. The power of a wrist shot comes from lower body strength more than arm strength. The advantage of a wrist shot over a slap shot is the minimal amount of setup required, creating an element of surprise. Moreover, a wrist shot is far more accurate than a slap shot. Conversely, the reliance on wrist and forearm muscles to propel the puck causes the wrist shot to be less powerful than the slap shot, though this is not true for all players. Transfer of bodyweight and the flex of a hockey stick are also key factors for a wrist shot. Weight should shift from the back leg to the front leg for maximum power. The flex of a stick is also key for a powerful wrist shot. Applying energy and weight onto the stick gives a whip like motion and thus provides the shot with even more power. The lower the flex number on a hockey stick, the more bend the stick creates.

The snap shot is a cross between the wrist shot and the slap shot. The shooter uses a small wind up involving other muscles and the flex of the shaft of the hockey stick in order to propel the puck. The snap shot has a strength and accuracy somewhere between those of a wrist shot and a slap shot.

The wrist shot has several phases:

- The bottom hand slides down the shaft of the stick and brings the blade behind the back leg (the leg furthest away from the target).
- Weight is transferred to the front leg as the arms sweep forward.
- The puck is then rolled along the blade of the stick, ending with a flick of the wrist which accelerates the puck due to the curve in the stick.
- As the puck is released in the forward motion, the follow through of the stick determines the height and direction of the shot.

Current or former NHL players known for scoring on wrist shots include Alexander Ovechkin, Steven Stamkos, Evgeni Malkin, Patrick Kane, Auston Matthews and Joe Sakic.
