= Slapshot =

Shooting technique in hockey

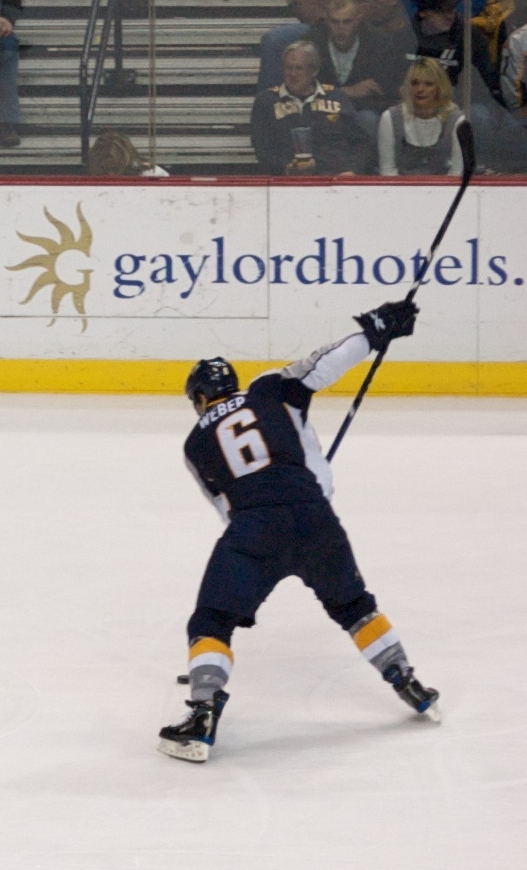
Shea Weber winding up for a slapshot

A slapshot (also spelled as slap shot) is a powerful shot in ice hockey. Its advantage is a high-speed shot that can be taken from a long distance; the disadvantage is the long time to set it up as well as its low accuracy.

It has four stages which are executed in one fluid motion to launch the puck toward the net:

1. The player winds up his hockey stick to shoulder height or higher.
2. The player violently "slaps" the ice slightly behind the puck and uses his weight to bend the stick, storing energy into it like a spring. This bending of the stick gives the slapshot its speed. Like a bow and arrow, the stick's tendency to return to being straight is transferred to the puck, giving it much more speed than just hitting it alone could.
3. When the face of the stick blade strikes the puck, the player rolls his wrists and shifts his weight so that the energy stored in the stick is released through the puck.
4. Finally, the player follows through, ending up with the stick pointed towards the desired target.

The slapshot is a hard and fast shot, and difficult to make accurate. It also takes longer to execute; a player usually cannot take a slapshot while under any significant pressure from an opponent because they could easily interfere during the windup. Offensive players, when wary of a defensive player intervening, may elect to take a shot that is quicker to set up, such as a wrist shot. The slapshot is most commonly used by a defenceman at the point, especially during a power play, although a forward will sometimes find an opportunity to use it. Slapshots are iconic to hockey's image due to their capability to score as a surprise turning point, the loose equivalent of a home run in baseball or a Hail Mary in American football.

== Origin, history, and usage ==
The invention of the slapshot is credited to Bernard "Boom Boom" Geoffrion (a nickname alluding to the thunderous clack of his slapshots) of the Montreal Canadiens. Black Canadian Eddie Martin, of the Coloured Hockey League's Halifax Eurekas, has also been credited with inventing the slapshot in the late 1800s. Dick Irvin, who was a star player in the WCHL and PCHA – and who later coached Geoffrion with the Habs – was also renowned for having a hard and accurate slapshot. Growing up in Winnipeg in the 1890s and 1900s, he would practice shooting against a doorknob in his attic during the winter months for accuracy. In the summertime, Irvin would draw a chalk outline of a net onto his family's sled garage, and practice one timers off a piece of wooden board embedded into the ground.

Starting in the 2010s, usage of the slapshot at the highest levels of professional play (such as the NHL) has declined, with the exception of the one-timer shot. This is due to a number of reasons. Defensively, players are much faster and more adept at blocking shooting lanes, punishing the comparatively slow setup time of a slapshot. Better equipment has made players less fearful about blocking extremely fast shots with their bodies. Even if a defenceman does not close on the puck in time, goalies are better prepared and know that a slapshot is likely a direct shot to compensate for accuracy issues, and can quickly square up to block a slapshot with their body. Offensively, modern composite ice hockey sticks are lighter and more flexible than classic 20th century wooden sticks, which has enabled accurate wrist shots from further out than was feasible before. With the accuracy flaw fixed, players have preferred the faster setup to take a wrist shot to better surprise defences. Additionally, wrist shots allow more trickery and deception to confuse the goalie. Players are able to set up surprising angles with how they pull the shot. Slapshots tend to be straighter and have to get into the goal via pure power and speed, which are better prepared for in modern hockey. The one-timer still sees use by letting the person taking the slapshot set up before they even have the puck, thus avoiding the slow wind-up time that gives the defence a chance to react.

== Speed records ==
A puck can reach the speeds of 100 miles per hour (160 km/h) or more when struck. A slapshot is the traditional way to set up such powerful shots.

The KHL record for fastest shot is held by Alexander Riazantsev, who slapped a puck at the KHL All-Star Game's Skill competition in Riga, Latvia, with a speed of 114.127 mph (183.67 km/h) on January 21, 2012.

The NHL record for fastest shot is held by Zdeno Chara, whose shot was measured at 108.8 mph (175.5 km/h) during the NHL All-Star Game's Skills Competition in Ottawa, Ontario, Canada, on January 29, 2012.

The AHL record for fastest slapshot is held by Martin Frk, with a shot clocked at 109.2 mph (175.7 km/h) during the AHL All-Star Game's Skills Competition in Ontario, California, USA, on January 26, 2020.

NHL/AHL and KHL slapshot speed records are not directly comparable to each other, as the official regulations for the hardest shot vastly differs between the leagues.

== See also ==
- Shot (ice hockey)
- Backhand slapshot
- Wrist shot
