= Slot (ice hockey) =

Area on the rink in front of the goalie

In hockey, the slot is the area on the hockey rink directly in front of the goaltender between the faceoff circles and extending to the top of the faceoff circles. It is sometimes referred to as the "scoring area".

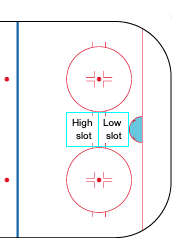
Hockey Slot

The "high" slot extends from the highest points of the faceoff circles to the hash marks. Similarly, the "low" slot extends from the crease to the hash marks.
