= Hockey puck =

Sports equipment for ice hockey

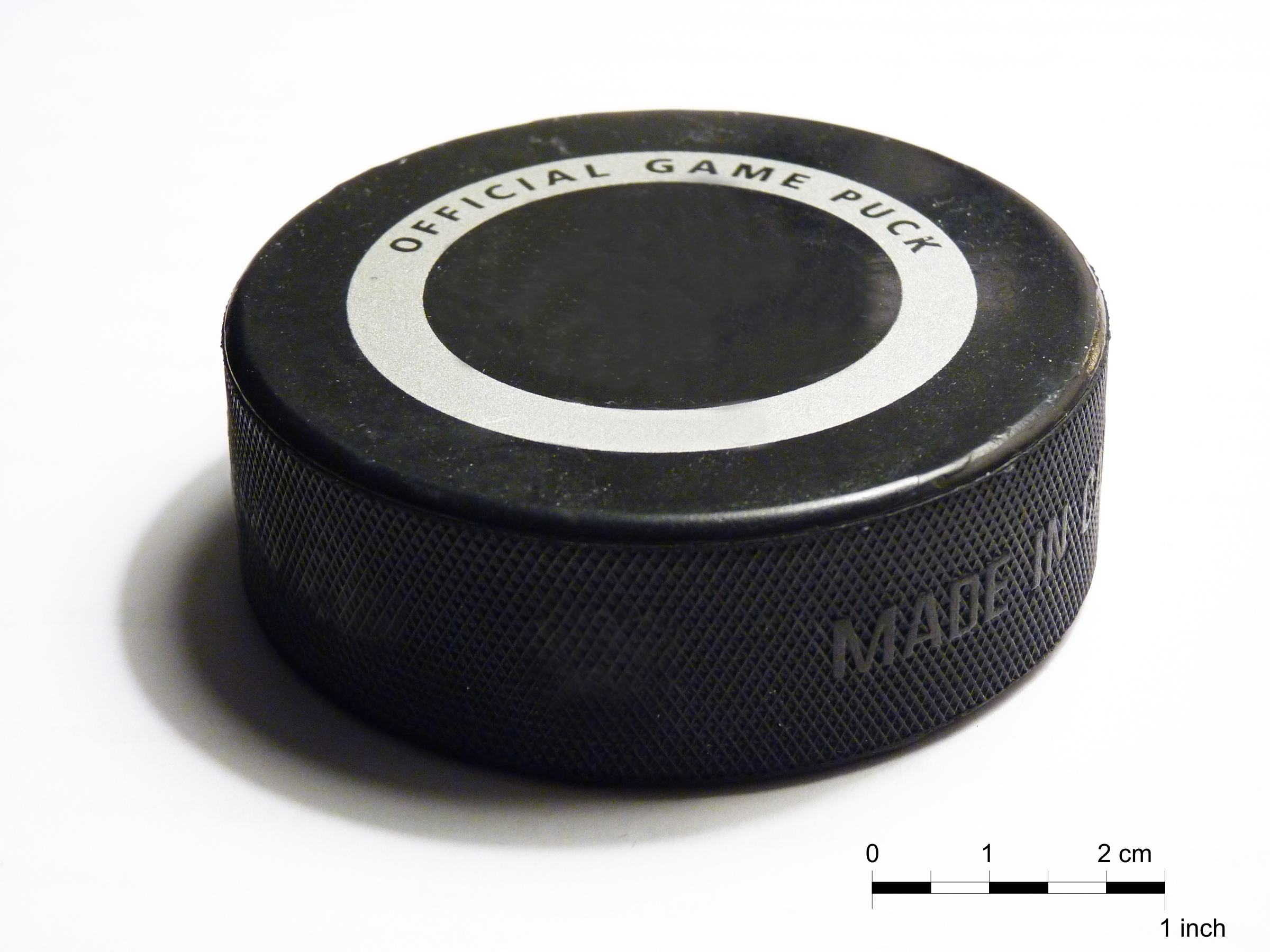
A standard ice hockey puck

A hockey puck is either an open or closed disk used in a variety of sports and games. There are designs made for use on an ice surface, such as in ice hockey, and others for the different variants of floor hockey which includes the wheeled skate variant of inline hockey (a.k.a. roller hockey). They are all designed to serve the same function a ball does in ball games.

A closed disk hockey puck having the shape of a short cylinder made of vulcanized rubber is used in the sport of ice hockey. Hockey pucks are designed for use on either an ice surface, dry floor, or underwater, though open disk designs have only been used on floors.

Open disk hockey pucks have a hole, forming the shape of a toroid, for use in a particular style of floor hockey. They should not be confused with ringette rings, which are toruses, for use in the sport of ringette.

== Etymology ==
The origin of the word puck is vague. The Oxford English Dictionary suggests the name is related to the verb to puck (a cognate of poke) used in the games of shinty and hurling for striking or pushing the ball, from the Scottish Gaelic puc or the Irish poc, meaning "to poke, punch or deliver a blow":

It is possible that settlers of Nova Scotia, many of whom were Scottish and Irish who played shinty and hurling, may have introduced the word to Canada. This is supported by the prevalent use in Canada of the word "shinny" for an informal or "pick-up" game of hockey, which is also derived from the Scottish game of shinty. The first known printed reference was in Montreal, in 1876 (Montreal Gazette of February 7, 1876), just a year after the first indoor game was played there.

A hockey puck is also referred to colloquially as a "biscuit". To put the "biscuit in the basket" (colloquial for the goal) is to score a goal.

== In ice hockey ==
The puck (very center) is shot towards the goal by Bryan Rust (far right)

Ice hockey requires a hard disk of vulcanized rubber. A standard ice hockey puck is black, 1 inch (25 mm) thick, 3 inches (76 mm) in diameter, and weighs between 5.5 and 6 ounces (156 and 170 g); some pucks are heavier or lighter than standard. Pucks are often marked with silkscreened team or league logos on one or both faces. Pucks are frozen before the game to reduce bouncing during play.

=== History ===
==== Ball games on ice ====
The sport of bandy, prior to its first official organization in Britain, had its informal variants spread to North America where they and game concepts from lacrosse, shinty and hurling served as precursors in some format to ice hockey. These informal games utilized various types of balls while being played on ice until the latter half of 19th century Canada, after which the game of ice hockey and the ice hockey puck began to take their official shape and form.

==== Shape and material ====
By the 1870s, flat pucks were made of wood as well as rubber. Records from the first indoor ice hockey game (1875) used a wooden puck, to prevent it from leaving the area of play though new evidence has shown that cuts from large corks have also been used.

At first, pucks (of either material) were made in the shape of a square. Rubber pucks were first made by slicing a rubber ball, then trimming the disk square. The original puck used first in the first organized games in Kingston on March 10, 1886 (on display at the Original Hockey Hall of Fame), was made from a cut-down lacrosse ball. It looks like a lump of coal, is made from soft rubber, and bounces far more than a modern hockey puck.

The Victoria Hockey Club of Montreal is credited with making and using the first round pucks, in the 1880s.

=== Variations ===
There are several variations on the standard black, 6-ounce (170 g) hockey puck. One of the most common is a blue, 4-ounce (110 g) puck that is used for training younger players who are not yet able to use a standard puck. Heavier 10-ounce (280 g) training pucks, typically reddish pink or reddish orange in colour, are also available for players looking to develop the strength of their shots or improve their stick handling skills. Players looking to increase wrist strength often practice with steel pucks that weigh 2 pounds (910 g); these pucks are not used for shooting, as they could seriously harm other players. White pucks are used for technical handling and goaltender practice. These are regulation size and weight, but made from white rubber. The colour blend in with the ice and rink and requires higher focus on the puck, making handling of the black puck at later stage easier. A hollow, light-weight fluorescent orange puck is available for road or floor hockey. Other variants, some with plastic ball-bearings or glides, are available for use for road or roller hockey.

Two major developments have been devised to create better puck visibility on television broadcasts, but both were short-lived. Two early attempts were made to improve puck visibility on television broadcasts, but both were short-lived. A third, the infrared tracking puck, has been in regular NHL use since 2021.

==== Firepuck ====
The use of a "Firepuck" in the early 1990s was the first attempt to improve the visibility of hockey pucks as seen on television. This invention incorporated coloured retro reflective materials of either embedded lens elements or prismatic reflectors laminated into recesses on the flat surfaces and the vertical edge of a standard hockey puck. Yellow was the preferred reflected colour. A spotlight was required to be positioned on the TV camera and focused at the centre of the viewing area.

A short demonstration tape of the Minnesota North Stars skating with the Firepuck was shown during the period break at the 1993 NHL All-Star Game in Montreal. The International Hockey League (IHL) pursued testing the Firepuck with its inventor, Donald Klassen. The next television viewing was the IHL All-Star Game in Fort Wayne, Indiana, January 1994, where the Firepuck was used for the entire game. The IHL tested the Firepuck in two more games, and finally the East Coast Hockey League used it January 17, 1997, for their all-star game.

The use of the Firepuck was discontinued because of these reasons:

- The slight structural change increased the tendency for the puck to bounce on the ice. This made it more difficult for the goaltender and resulted in increased scoring.
- The skaters objected to the use of camera spotlights which reflected off the ice.
- The television viewing contrast of the Firepuck was not noticeably enhanced when the camera view was of the entire rink, this being the most common camera shot.

The Firepuck name was branded during the 1990s but has since been discontinued.

==== Smart puck ====
The FoxTrax "smart puck" was developed by the Fox television network when it held National Hockey League (NHL) broadcasting rights for the United States. The puck had integrated electronics to track its position on screen; a blue streak traced the path of the puck across the ice. The streak would turn red if the puck was shot especially hard. This was an experiment in broadcasting intended to help viewers unfamiliar with hockey to better follow the game by making the puck more visible. It was ill-received by many traditional hockey fans, but appreciated by many of the more casual viewers. The system debuted with much publicity in the NHL All-Star game at the Boston Fleet Center on January 20, 1996, but the system was shelved when Fox Sports lost the NHL broadcast rights three years later.

===== Tracking puck =====
The NHL’s current puck and player tracking system, NHL Edge, was developed by SMT, the company behind the yellow first-down line in American football broadcasts. Each tracking puck still weighs the standard six ounces, but contains circuitry and a six-hour battery inside the rubber, and emits infrared light 60 times a second. Between fourteen and sixteen cameras mounted in each arena triangulate the position of the puck and the players. A tracking puck costs about forty dollars, compared with about two dollars for a standard puck. The NHL first used tracking pucks in January 2021 but withdrew them six days into the season because they did not glide like a normal puck. A redesigned version, with six circles on each face covering tubes that let the infrared light through, was introduced for the 2021–22 season. The sensors are built into pucks made by Inglasco, which has supplied the NHL’s pucks since 1996. The tracking data is used by teams for player development and scouting, and in television broadcasts.

=== Ballistics ===
Most goals are scored by airborne pucks, sometimes seen to tumble through the air, on their way in to the net.

Radar guns are commonly used to measure shot speed. During a game, pucks can reach speeds of 100 miles per hour (160 km/h) or more when struck. The current world record is held by Denis Kulyash of KHL's Avangard Omsk, who slapped a puck at the 2011 KHL All-Star Game skills competition in St. Petersburg, Russia on 5 February 2011 with a speed of 110.3 miles per hour (177.5 km/h). Zdeno Chára, whose slapshot clocked 108.8 miles per hour (175.1 km/h) in the 2013 NHL All-Star Game SuperSkills competition, broke his own earlier record.

=== In game play ===
Fast-flying pucks are potentially dangerous to players and spectators. Puck-related injuries at hockey games are not uncommon. This led to the evolution of various types of protective gear for players, most notably the goaltender mask. The most notable incident involving a spectator took place on March 18, 2002, when a 13-year-old girl, Brittanie Cecil, died two days after being struck on the head by a hockey puck deflected into the crowd at an NHL game between the Calgary Flames and Columbus Blue Jackets in Columbus. This is the only known incident of this type to have occurred in the history of the league. Partly as a result of this event, the glass or plexiglass panels that sit atop the boards of hockey rinks to protect spectators have been supplemented with mesh nets that extend above the upper edge of the glass.

=== Manufacture ===
NHL regulation pucks were not required for professional play until the 1990–91 season, but were standardized for consistent play and ease of manufacture half a century earlier, by Art Ross, in 1940. Major manufacturers of pucks exist in Canada, Russia, the Czech Republic, the People's Republic of China, and Slovakia.

The black rubber of the puck is made up of a mix of natural rubber, antioxidants, bonding materials and other chemicals to achieve a balance of hardness and resilience. This mixture is then turned in a machine with metal rollers, where workers add extra natural rubber, and ensure that the mixing is even. Samples are then put into a machine that analyses if the rubber will harden at the right temperature. An automated apparatus, called a pultrusion machine, extrudes the rubber into long circular logs that are 3 inches (7.6 cm) in diameter and then cut into 1 inch (2.5 cm) thick pieces while still soft. These pre-forms are then manually put into moulds that are the exact size of a finished puck. There are up to 200 mould cavities per moulding palette, capable of producing up to 5,000 pucks per week. The moulds are then compressed. This compression may be done cold or with the moulds heated to 300 °F (149 °C) for 18 minutes, depending on the proprietary methods of the manufacturer. They come out hard and then are allowed to sit for 24 hours. Each puck is manually cleaned with a trimmer machine to remove excess rubber. The moulding process adds a diamond cross-hatch texture around the edge of the puck for improved friction between the stick and puck for better control and puck handling.

Practice pucks are made by a similar but faster process that uses larger pre-forms, 4–5 in (10–13 cm) thick, puts them into moulds automatically, and applies more pressure and heat over a shorter period of time to compress the puck into the standard size. This allows approximately twice as many pucks to be manufactured in the same time period as the more exacting production of NHL regulation pucks. Pucks are often frozen to reduce the amount of bounce.

The list of former or present-day major producers includes

- (Canada) Viceroy
- (Canada) Inglasco – Olympics 2010.
- (Canada) Pro-Flex
- (Czech Republic) Gufex – Olympics 1998, 2002, 2006 and 2018. Since 1999, all World Championships.
- (Czech Republic) Rubena – Olympics 2014.
- (Slovakia) Vegum Dolné Vestenice
- (United States) Converse
- (United States) HockeyShot
- (United States) Spalding
- (China) Xiamen Yin Hua Silicone Rubber Products Co., Ltd.
- (China) Xiamen Deng Hong Silica Gel Product Co., Ltd.
- (China) Xiamen Ijetech Industry & Trade Co. Ltd

== In roller hockey ==
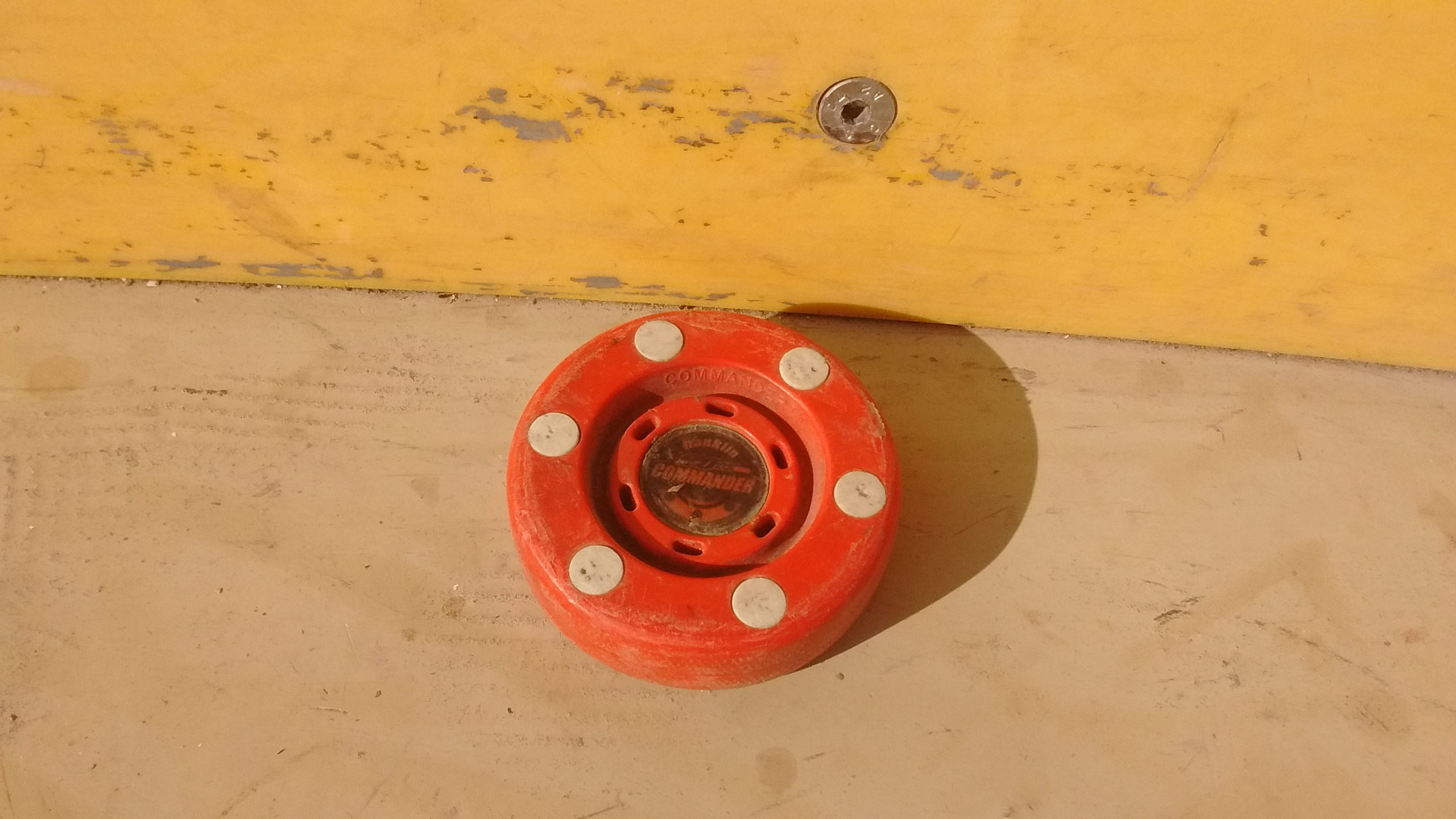
Roller hockey, puck a.k.a. inline-hockey puck

Roller hockey pucks, a.k.a. in-line hockey pucks, are similar to ice-hockey pucks but are made from plastic and thus lighter. They have small ribs protruding from their tops and bottoms which limit contact with the surface, allowing better sliding motion and less friction. These pucks typically come in light, easily visible colors: mostly commonly red, but also sometimes orange, yellow, pink, or green. Roller hockey pucks were created so inline hockey and street hockey players could play with a puck instead of a ball on surfaces such as hardwood, concrete, and asphalt.

== In underwater hockey ==
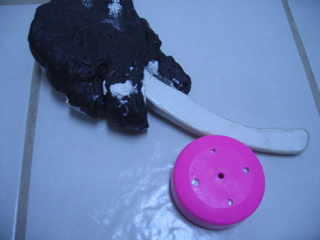
Underwater Hockey puck pushed by stick

Underwater hockey uses a type of puck that while similar in appearance to an ice hockey puck, differs in that it has a lead core weighing approximately 3 pounds (1.4 kg) within a teflon, plastic or rubber coating. This makes the puck dense enough to sink in a swimming pool, though it can be lofted during passes, while affording some protection to the pool tiles.

A smaller and lighter version of the standard puck exists for junior competition and is approximately 1 lb 12 oz (0.80–0.85 kg) and of similar construction to the standard puck.

While there are numerous regional variations in colour, construction and materials all must conform to international regulations stipulating overall dimensions and weight. The regulations state that pucks should be a bright distinctive colour, for example high-visibility pink or orange, and that for World Championships these are the only acceptable colours.

== In spongee ==
Spongee a.k.a. "sponge hockey", is an organized recreational cult game that emerged in Canada around the 1950s and is played in the Canadian city of Winnipeg. It gets its name from the puck that is used: instead of the hard vulcanized rubber puck used in regular ice hockey, a softer sponge puck is used. At one point, some locals referred to it as "tweeter" based on the sound the original pucks made. The game is a variant of ice hockey and was influenced by Canadian road-hockey and ice-hockey players playing shinny on outdoor rinks in running shoes and winter boots. The game is played in winter strictly on outdoor rinks, does not use ice skates, and has codes involving less contact. Broomball shoes are sometimes used.

The spongee puck originated when someone took a toy red-white-and-blue handball and cut out the center, leaving a rude approximation of a standard hockey puck. Eventually manufactured types of sponge pucks came into use, some of which were developed in Slovakia and had a spring core. Spongee pucks are softer than ice hockey pucks and have more bounce.

== In other sports and games ==
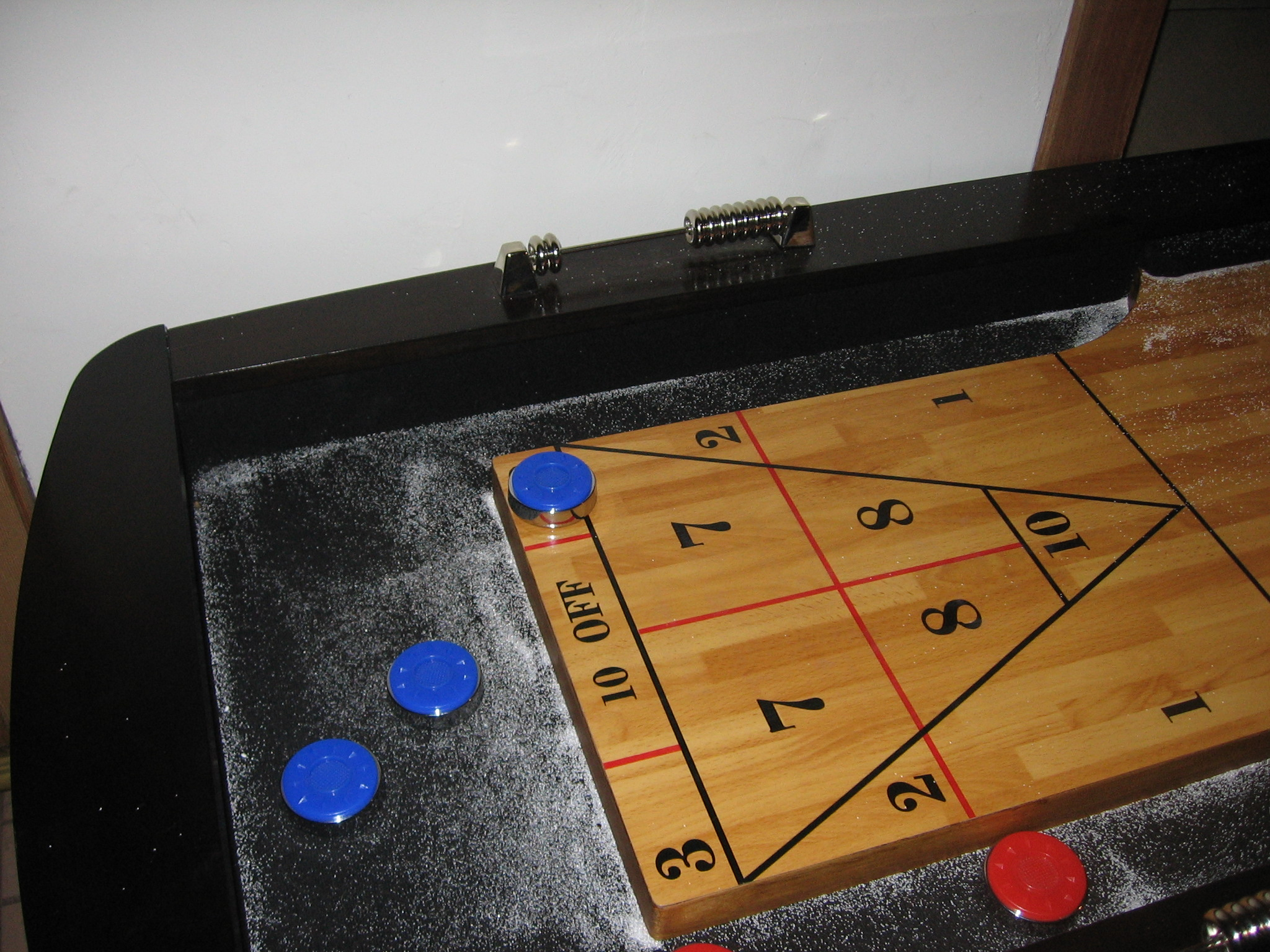
Table shuffleboard pucks

The term "puck" is sometimes also applied to similar (though often smaller) gaming discs in other sports and games, including novuss, shuffleboard, table shuffleboard, box hockey, floor hockey, and air hockey.

== Alternative uses ==
Ice hockey pucks of regulation 3-inch (7.6 cm) diameter and 1-inch (2.5 cm) thickness may be used as mechanical vibration dampening isolators in places such as feet for light industrial air compressors, and air conditioning units because they are of regulation materials and therefore consistent manufacture, size, and shape, and are constructed of a repeatable and consistent vulcanized rubber material.

Since the material is rubber, it may be drilled out or milled easily to a fixed depth as rubber feet or used as a rubber spacer or gasket material.

A very common use of a slotted hockey puck is as an adaptor between the metal foot of a trolley jack and the sill (rocker panel) of an automobile. The sill has a spot-welded lip which fits into the slot of the puck and would otherwise be bent or marked by the metal foot.

In November 2018, faculty of Oakland University in Michigan received hockey pucks and training to throw them as a possible last-ditch defense against active shooters. The American Association of University Professors distributed pucks to its 800 members, and is working with student groups to distribute an additional 1,700 pucks to students.
