= Ice Hockey World Championships =

Recurring international ice hockey tournament for men's national teams

- Upcoming season or competition: 2027 Men's Ice Hockey World Championships
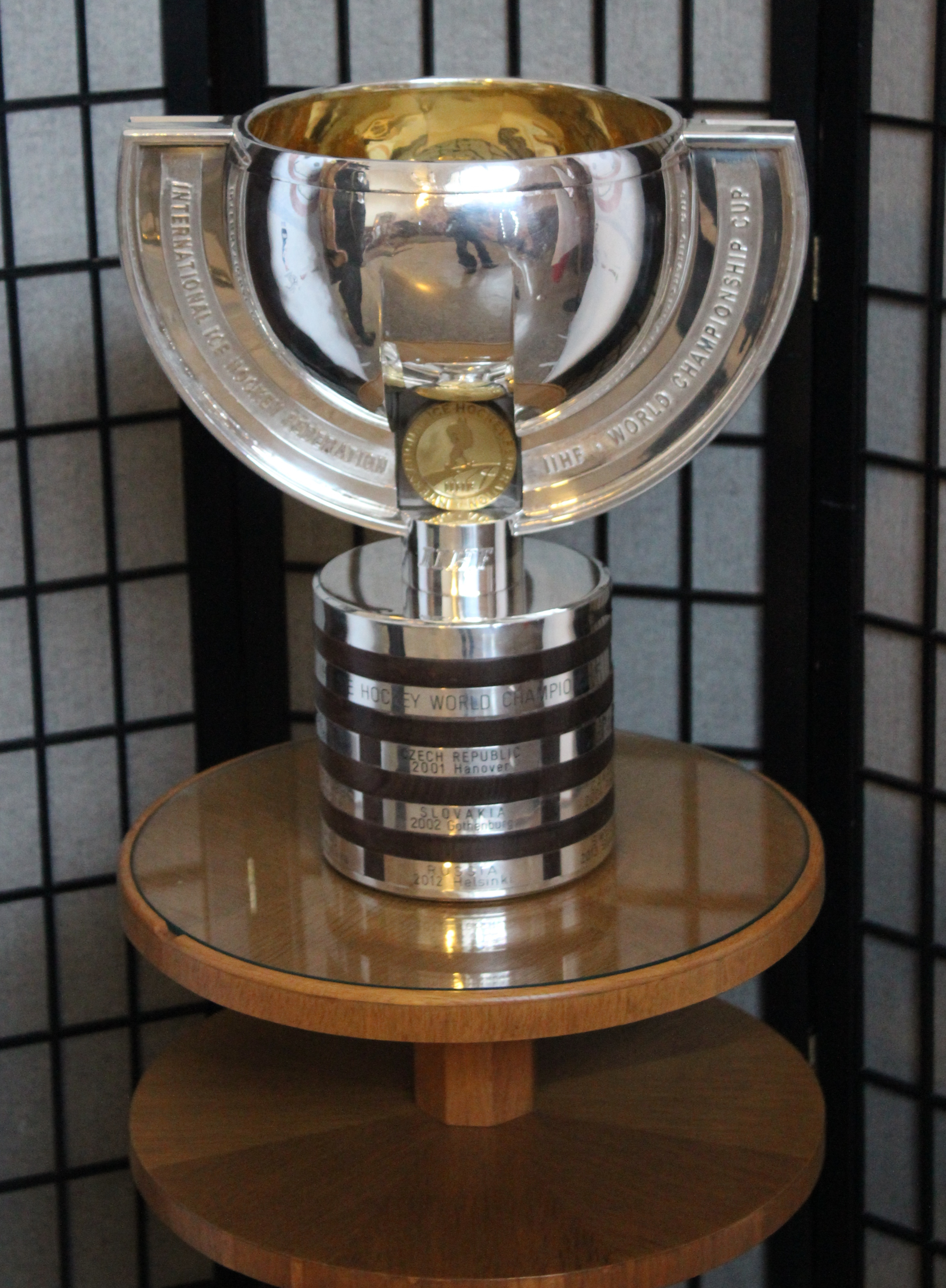
- IIHF World Championship Cup
- Sport: Ice hockey
- Founded: 1920 (1920 Summer Olympics); 1930 (first individual event)
- No. of teams: 16 (Top division); 12 (Division I); 12 (Division II); 12 (Division III); 6 (Division IV)
- Country: IIHF member countries
- Continent: Worldwide
- Most recent champion: Finland (5th title)
- Most titles: Canada (28 titles)
- Website: IIHF.com

The Ice Hockey World Championships are an annual international men's ice hockey tournament organized by the International Ice Hockey Federation (IIHF), first officially held at the 1920 Summer Olympics. The IIHF was created in 1908 while the European Championships, the precursor to the World Championships, were first held in 1910. The tournament held at the 1920 Summer Olympics is recognized as the first Ice Hockey World Championship. From 1920 to 1968, the Olympic hockey tournament was also considered the World Championship for that year.

The first World Championship that was held as an individual event was in 1930 in which twelve nations participated. In 1931, ten teams played a series of round-robin format qualifying rounds to determine which nations participated in the medal round. Medals were awarded based on the final standings of the teams in the medal round. In 1951, thirteen nations took part and were split into two groups. The top seven teams (Pool A) played for the World Championship. The other six (Pool B) played for ranking purposes. This basic format would be used until 1992 (although small variations were made). During a congress in 1990, the IIHF introduced a playoff system. As the IIHF grew, more teams began to participate at the World Championships, so more pools (later renamed divisions) were introduced.

The modern format for the World Championship features 16 teams in the championship group, 12 teams in Division I, 12 teams in Division II and 12 teams in Division III. If there are more than 52 teams, the rest compete in Division IV. The teams in the championship play a preliminary round, then the top eight teams play in the playoff medal round and the winning team is crowned World Champion. Over the years, the tournament has gone through several rule changes. In 1969 body-checking in all three zones in a rink was allowed, helmets and goaltender masks became mandatory in the early 1970s and in 1992 the IIHF began using the shootout. The current IIHF rules differ slightly from the rules used in the NHL. From the 1920 Olympics until the 1976 World Championships, only athletes designated as "amateur" were allowed to compete in the tournament. Because of this, players from the National Hockey League (NHL) and its senior minor-league teams were not allowed to compete, while the Soviet Union was allowed to use permanent full-time players who were positioned as regular workers of an aircraft industry or tractor industry employer that sponsored what would be presented as an after-hours amateur social sports society team for their workers. In 1970, after an agreement to allow just a small number of its professionals to participate was rescinded by the IIHF, Canada withdrew from the tournament. Starting in 1977, professional athletes were allowed to compete in the tournament and Canada re-entered. The IIHF requires that players are citizens of the country they represent and allow players to switch national teams provided that they play in their new nation for a certain period of time.

Canada was the tournament's first dominant team, winning the tournament 12 times from 1930 to 1952. The United States, Czechoslovakia, Sweden, Great Britain and Switzerland were also competitive during this period. The Soviet Union first participated in 1954 and soon became rivals with Canada. From 1963 until the nation's breakup in 1991, the Soviet Union was the dominant team, winning 20 championships out of 26. During that period, only three other nations won medals: Canada, Czechoslovakia and Sweden. Russia first participated in 1992 and the Czech Republic first participated in 1993, while Slovakia began competing in 1994. In the 2000s, the competition became more open as the "Big Six" teams – Canada, Czechia, Finland, Russia, Sweden, and the United States – have become more evenly matched.

As this tournament takes place during the same period as the later stages of the NHL's Stanley Cup playoffs, many of that league's top players are not available to participate for their national teams or have only become available after their NHL teams have been eliminated, after playing 90+ games. North American teams have been previously criticised for not taking this tournament seriously.

The 2024 World Championship, held in Prague and Ostrava, Czechia, was the most successful to date in terms of overall attendance; it was visited by 797,727 people and average attendance was at 12,464.

== Background ==
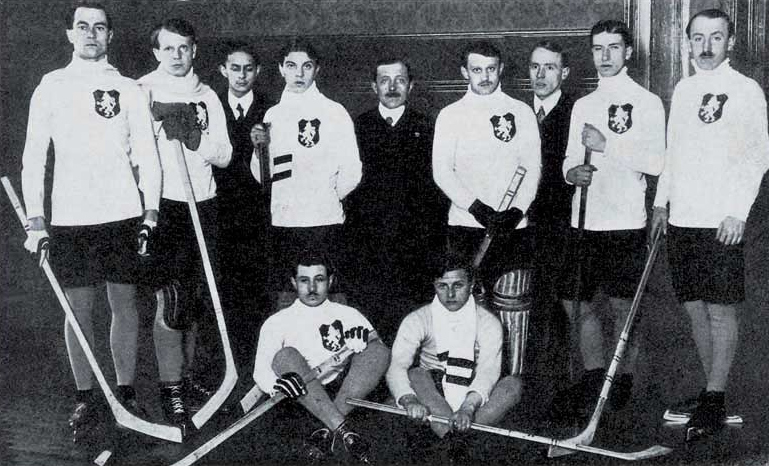
Bohemian European Champions in 1911

The International Ice Hockey Federation (IIHF), the sport's governing body, was created on 15 May 1908 under the name Ligue Internationale de Hockey sur Glace (LIHG). In 1908, organized ice hockey was still relatively new; the first organized indoor ice hockey game took place on 3 March 1875 at Montreal's Victoria Skating Rink. In 1887, four clubs from Montreal formed the Amateur Hockey Association of Canada (AHAC) and developed a structured schedule. Lord Stanley donated the Stanley Cup and the trustees decided to award it to either the best team in the AHAC, or to any pre-approved team that won it in a challenge. The Eastern Canada Amateur Hockey Association (ECAHA) was formed in 1905, which mixed paid and amateur players in its rosters. The ECAHA eventually folded and as a result of the dissolution, the National Hockey Association (NHA) formed.

The Ice Hockey European Championships, first held in Les Avants, Switzerland in January 1910, was the first official hockey tournament for national teams. Participating nations in the inaugural event were Great Britain, Germany, Belgium and Switzerland. In North America, professional hockey was continuing to grow, the National Hockey League (NHL), the largest professional hockey league in the world, was formed in 1917. The European Championships were held for five consecutive years but were not held from 1915 to 1920 due to World War I. The LIHG Championships, held between 1911 and 1914, is also considered a precursor to the World Championships, though the competition did not gain as much importance at the time.

== History ==
=== 1920–1928: Olympic Games ===
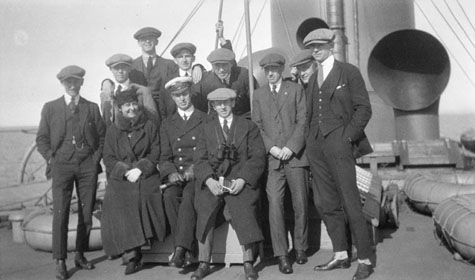
The gold medal-winning Winnipeg Falcons (representing Canada) en route to the 1920 Summer Olympics.

The IIHF considers the ice hockey tournament held at the 1920 Summer Olympics to be the first Ice Hockey World Championship. It was organized by a committee that included future IIHF president Paul Loicq. The tournament was played from 23 to 29 April. Seven teams participated: Canada, Czechoslovakia, the United States, Switzerland, Sweden, France and Belgium. Canada, represented by the Winnipeg Falcons, won the gold medal, outscoring opponents 27–1. The United States and Czechoslovakia won the silver and bronze medals respectively. Following the 1921 Olympic Congress in Lausanne, the first Winter Olympics were held in 1924 in Chamonix, France, though they were only officially recognized by the International Olympic Committee (IOC) as such in the following year.

Subsequently, every Olympic tournament up to and including the 1968 Winter Olympics is counted as the World Championship. Canada won the gold medal at both the 1924 and 1928 Winter Olympics. In 1928, the Swedish and Swiss teams won their first medals–silver and bronze, respectively–and a German team participated for the first time, finishing ninth.

=== 1930–1953: Canadian dominance ===
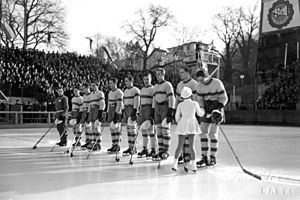
Finland national team at the 1939 World Championships

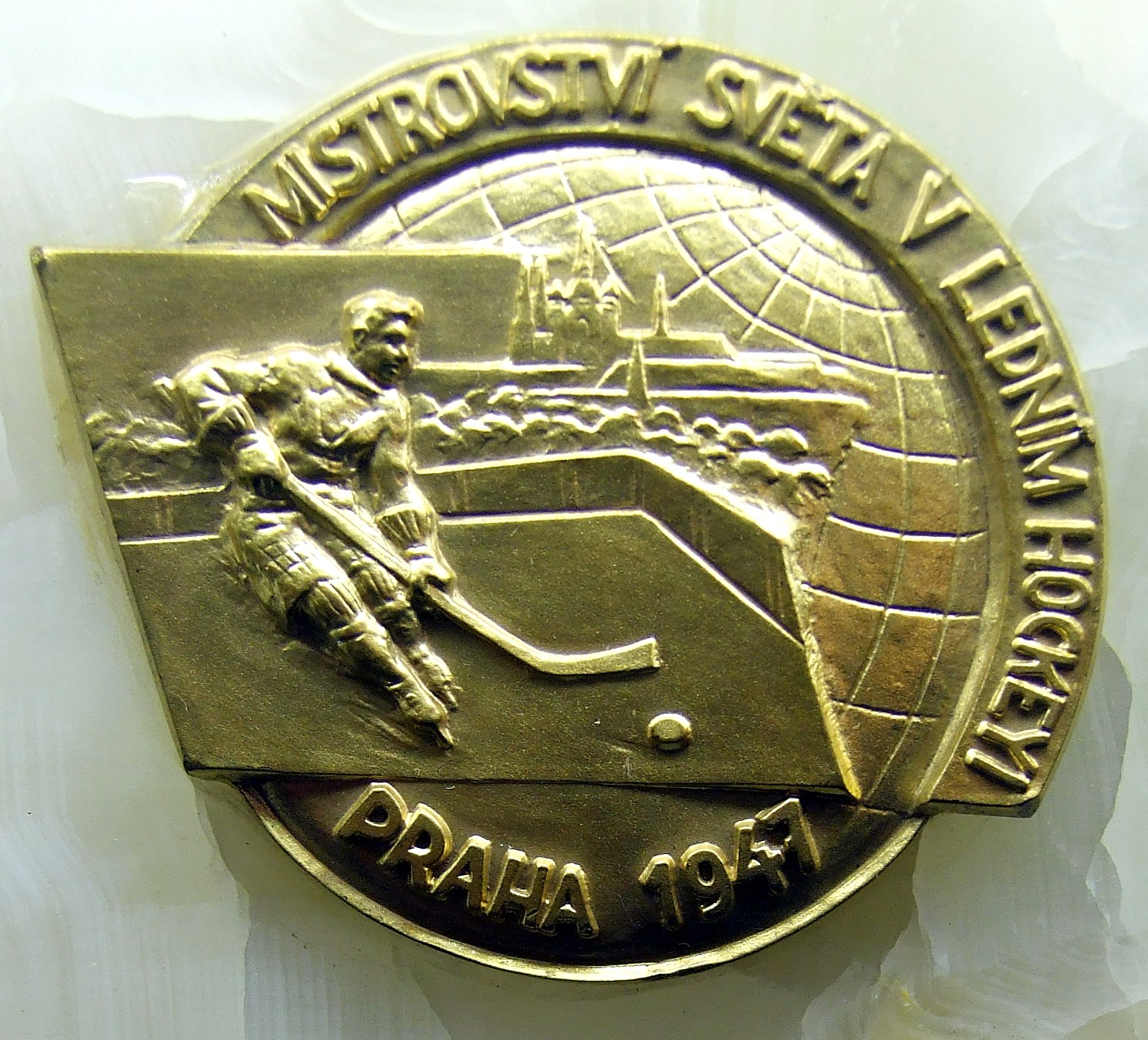
A gold medal won by Czechoslovakia (1947)

The first World Championship that was held as an individual event was in 1930. It was held in Chamonix, France; Vienna, Austria; and Berlin, Germany. Canada, represented by the Toronto CCMs, defeated Germany in the gold medal game, and Switzerland won the bronze. Canada, represented by the Manitoba Grads, won the following year, and the Winnipeg Winnipegs won Gold for Canada at the 1932 Winter Olympics. At the 1933 World Championships in Prague, Czechoslovakia, the United States won the gold medal, becoming the first non-Canadian team to win the competition. The United States would not win gold again at a non-Olympic tournament until 2025. Two days before the 1936 Winter Olympics in Germany, Canadian officials protested that two players on the British team—James Foster and Alex Archer—had played in Canada but transferred without permission to play for clubs in the English National League. The IIHF agreed with Canada, but Britain threatened to withdraw if the two could not compete. Canada withdrew the protest before the games started. Britain became the first non-Canadian team to win Olympic gold, with the United States taking bronze. Canada won the remainder of the World Championship tournaments held in the 1930s. The 1939 World Championships marked the first time that a team from Finland competed in the tournament. World War II forced the cancellation of the 1940 and 1944 Winter Olympics and the World Championships from 1941 to 1946.

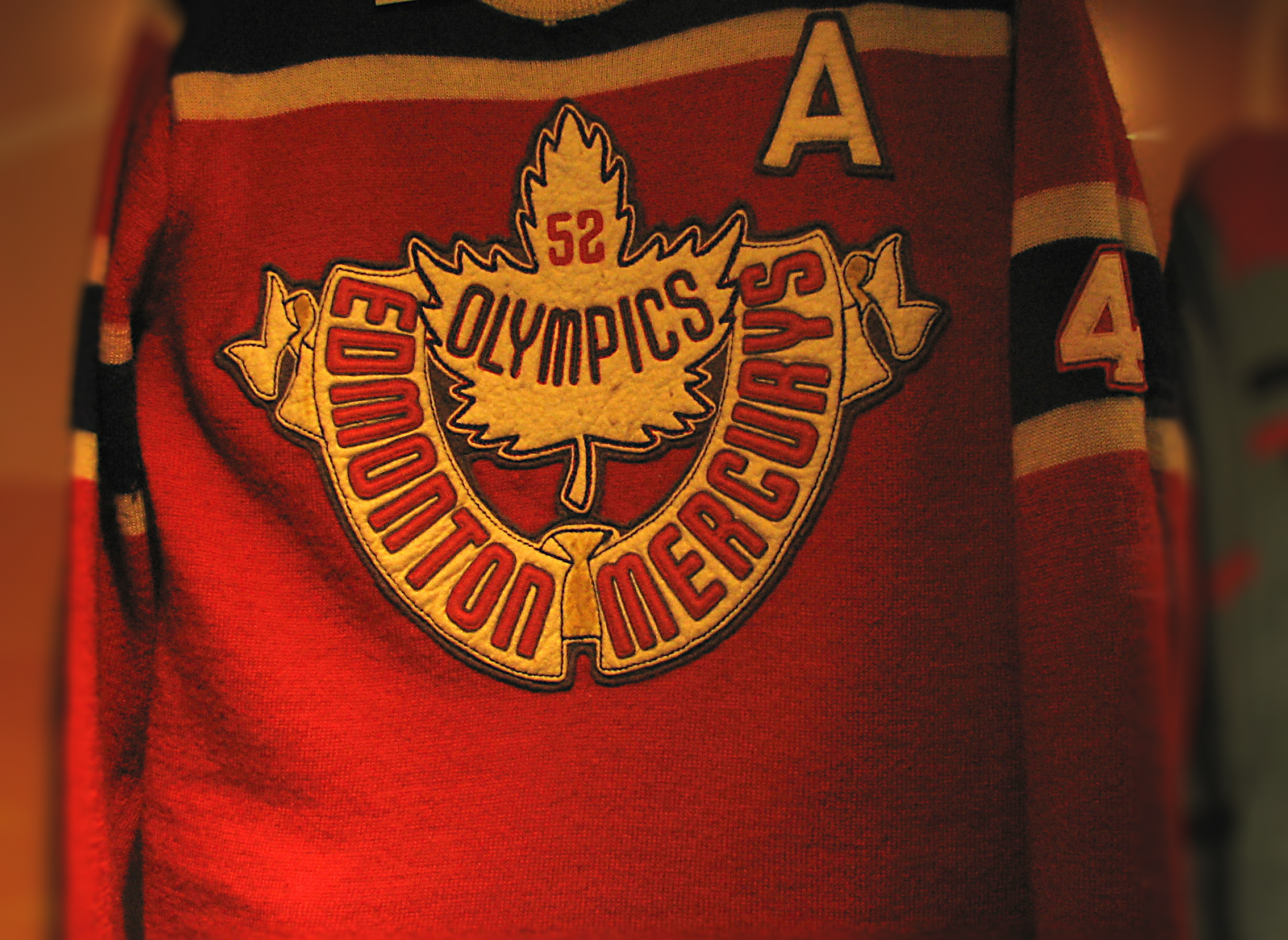
Jersey of Canada's 1952 World Champion / Olympic Gold Medal team, the Edmonton Mercurys

Following World War II, Czechoslovakia's team was quickly improving. They won the 1947 World Championships, although a Canadian team had not participated in the event. In 1949, they became the third nation to win a World Championship tournament that Canada participated in. During the run-up to the 1948 Winter Olympics in St. Moritz, Switzerland, a conflict broke out with the two American hockey bodies: the American Hockey Association (AHA, a forerunner to USA Hockey) and the Amateur Athletic Union (AAU). The AAU refused to support the AHA's team because they believed that AHA players were "openly paid salaries" and at the time, the Olympics were strictly for amateur players. A compromise was reached that the AHA team would be allowed to compete but would be considered unofficial and unable to win a medal. By the end of the tournament, the AHA team finished fourth in the standings. Both Czechoslovakia and the RCAF Flyers of Canada won seven games and tied when they played each other. The gold medal winner was determined by goal average: Canada won the gold because they had an average of 13.8 compared to Czechoslovakia's average of 4.3.

At the 1952 Winter Olympics in Oslo, Norway, the Edmonton Mercurys won Canada's second consecutive Olympic gold medal and their 15th World Championship in 19 competitions. It was the last time that a Canadian team would win an Olympic gold medal in hockey for 50 years. At the 1953 tournament, reigning champion Canada did not attend, while the team from Czechoslovakia withdrew because of the death of the General Secretary of the Communist Party of Czechoslovakia, leaving only Sweden, West Germany, and Switzerland competing in the top division. Sweden finished the tournament undefeated and won their first World Championship.

=== 1954–1962: Canada–Soviet Union rivalry ===
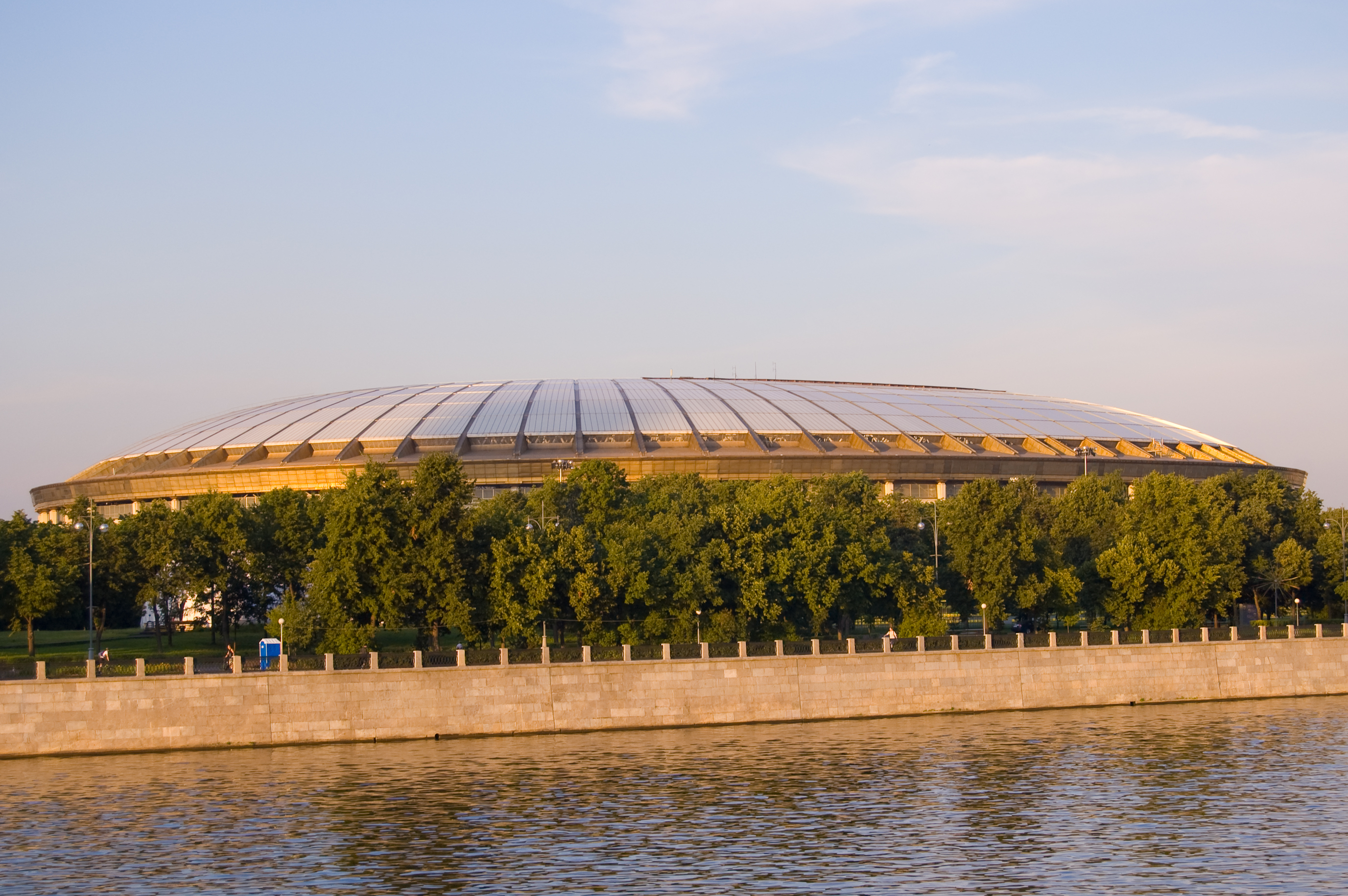
The final game at the 1957 World Championships in Moscow was played at the Luzhniki Stadium. It was attended by at least 50,000 people, a tournament record until 2010.

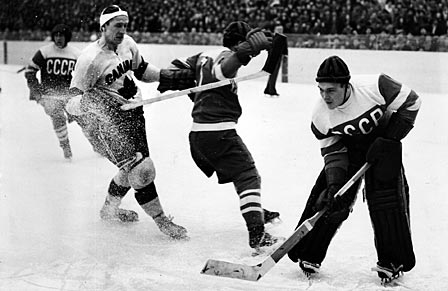
The game between Canada and the Soviet Union at the 1954 World Championships, which the Soviets won 7–2.

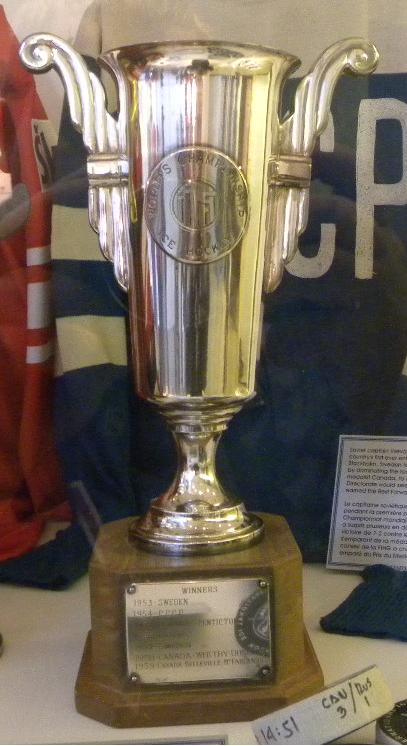
Former Ice Hockey World Champion trophy from 1953-1959

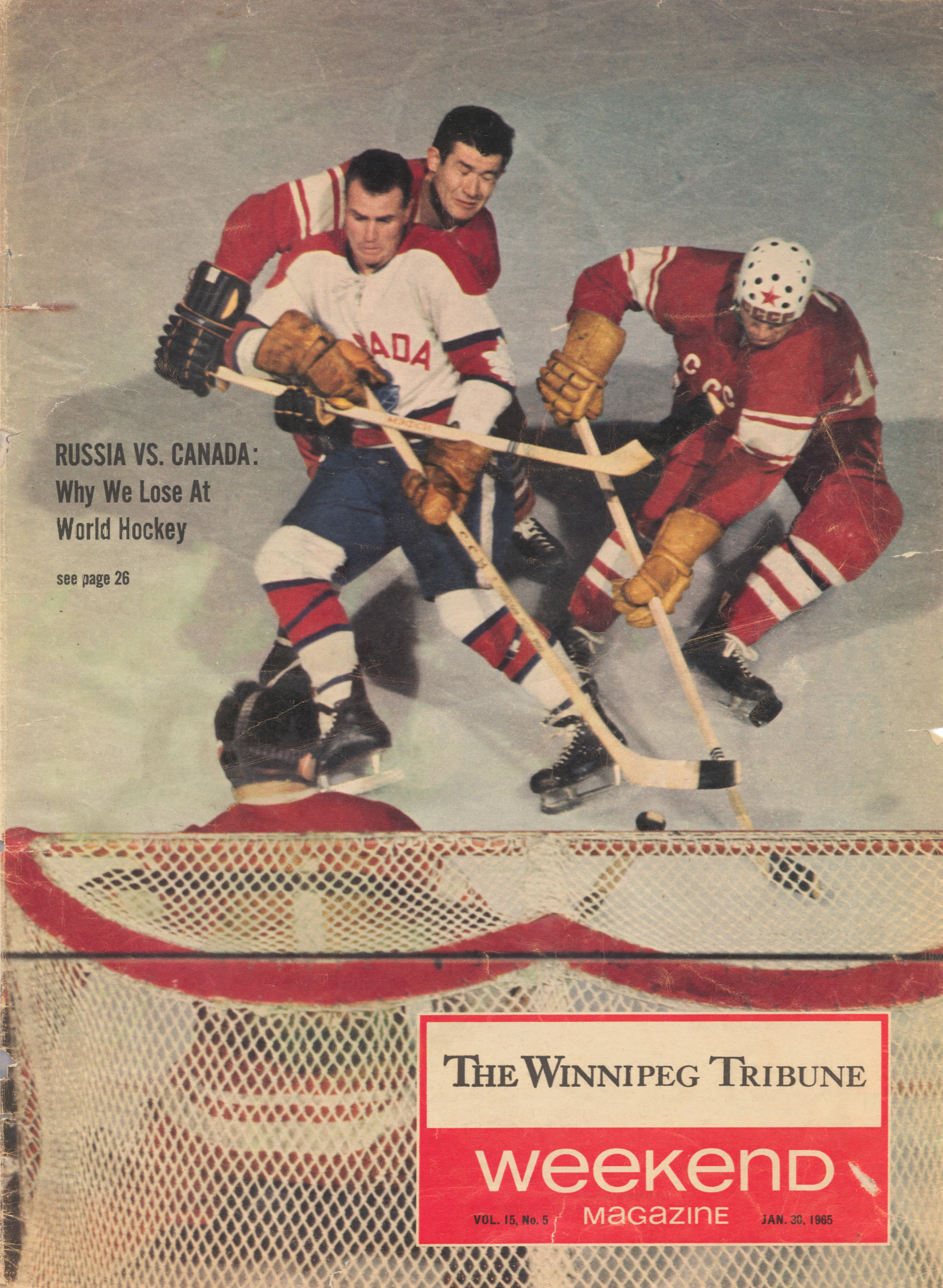
Soviet Union vs Canada in 1960s

The 1954 World Championships has been described by the IIHF as "the start of the modern era of international hockey." The tournament saw the first participation of the Soviet Union in international competition. The Soviet Union had organized its first ice hockey league in 1946, having previously focused on bandy. Led by coach Arkady Chernyshev, the Soviet national team finished their first six games undefeated. Canada, represented by the East York Lyndhursts, was also undefeated and, in the final game of the tournament, the two teams met for the first time in international competition. The Soviet Union won the game 7–2, becoming the fifth team to win a World Championship tournament. The 1955 World Championship was held in West Germany, and the two teams again met in the final game of the tournament. The game was so high profile in Canada that announcer Foster Hewitt flew to West Germany to provide play-by-play coverage. Both teams were undefeated and Canada, represented by the Penticton Vees, defeated the Soviets 5–0 to reclaim the World Championship. At the 1956 Winter Olympics in Cortina d'Ampezzo, Italy, Canada's Kitchener-Waterloo Dutchmen lost to both the Soviets and the United States in the medal round and won the bronze. The Soviets went undefeated and won their first Olympic ice hockey gold medal. It would be seven years until the Soviet Union won another World Championship.

The 1957 World Championships were held in Moscow. Canada and the United States did not participate in protest of the Soviet occupation of Hungary. Most of the games were held in the Luzhniki Sports Palace, but the Soviet officials decided to hold the final game in a nearby outdoor soccer stadium. The game was attended by at least 55,000 people, which stood as a World Championship attendance record until 2010. In the final game, Sweden edged the Soviet Union to finish with six wins and one tie (the Soviet Union had five wins and two ties) and won the gold medal. Canada returned to the World Championship in 1958 and won two consecutive titles, with the Soviets winning silver both times. At the 1960 Winter Olympics in Squaw Valley, California, Canada, the Soviet Union, Czechoslovakia and Sweden were the top four teams heading into the Games. All four were defeated by the American team, which won all seven games en route to its first Olympic gold medal.

In 1961, Czechoslovakia defeated the Soviet Union and tied Canada to make it a three-way race for gold. In the final game, Canada defeated the Soviets 5–1 to win their nineteenth gold medal. The Trail Smoke Eaters became the final club team to represent Canada. The following year, Canada implemented a national team program, led by Father David Bauer. Canada would not win another world championship gold until 1994. In 1962, the World Championships were held in North America for the first time. The tournament was held in Denver, United States, and was boycotted by the Soviet and Czechoslovak teams. Sweden defeated Canada for the first time in the history of the competition and won their third gold medal.

=== 1963–1976: Soviet dominance ===
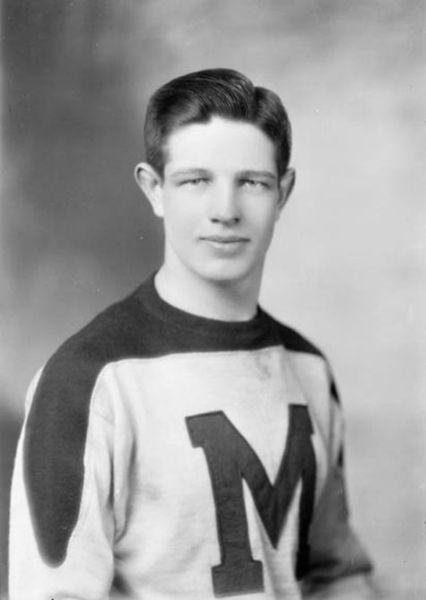
In 1962, David Bauer established a national team made up of Canada's top amateur players.

At the 1963 World Championships in Stockholm, the Soviet Union won the gold medal, beginning a streak of nine consecutive World Championship golds. The 1964 Winter Olympics in Innsbruck, Austria marked the first time that Canada failed to win an Olympic medal in hockey. The Soviet Union won all seven of their games and the gold medal, but Canada finished the tournament with five wins and two losses, putting them in a three-way tie for second place with Sweden and Czechoslovakia. Prior to 1964, the tie-breaking procedure was based on goal difference from games against teams in the medal round and under that system, Canada would have placed third ahead of the Czechoslovaks. The procedure had been changed to count all games and that meant the Canadians finished fourth. However, the Olympics also counted as the World Championships, and under IIHF rules, Canada should have won a World Championship bronze. In April 2005, the IIHF admitted that a mistake had occurred and announced that they had reviewed the decision and would award the 1964 Canadian team a World Championship bronze medal. However, two months later, the IIHF over-turned their decision and rejected an appeal in September.

The Soviets dominated the remainder of the decade. Following 1963, the team went undefeated in Olympic and World Championship competition for four years. Their streak was broken by Czechoslovakia at the 1968 Winter Olympics. Despite the loss, the Soviets still won gold. It was the last time that the Olympics were also counted as the World Championships. In 1969, the Soviet Union and Czechoslovakia played "the most emotionally charged games in the history of international hockey." The rights to host the tournament had originally been awarded to Czechoslovakia but they were forced to decline the rights following the Soviet-led Warsaw Pact invasion of the nation in August 1968. The tournament was held in Stockholm, Sweden, and with these international tensions, the Czechoslovak team was determined to defeat the Soviets. They won both of their games 2–0 and 4–3 but despite these wins, the Czechoslovaks lost both of their games to Sweden and won bronze.

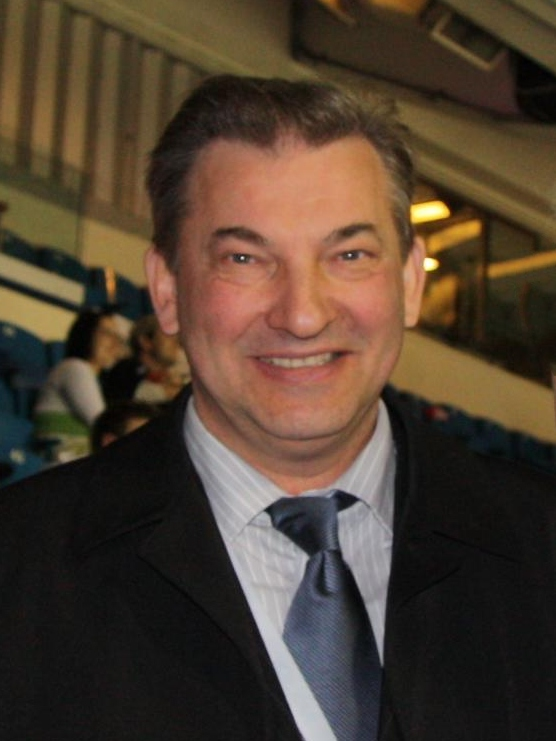
Vladislav Tretiak is one of two players (Alexander Ragulin being the other) to win ten World Championships.

With European teams using their best players who are de facto professionals, the Canadian Amateur Hockey Association (CAHA) felt their amateur players could no longer be competitive and pushed for the ability to use players from professional leagues. At the IIHF Congress in 1969, the IIHF voted to allow Canada to use nine non-NHL professional players at the 1970 World Championships. The rights to host the tournament were awarded to Canada for the first time–in Montreal and Winnipeg. However, the decision to allow the use of professionals was reversed in January 1970. IOC president Avery Brundage was opposed to the idea of amateur and professional players competing together and said that ice hockey's status as an Olympic sport would be in jeopardy if the change was made. In response, Canada withdrew from International ice hockey competition. Canada's ice hockey team did not participate in the 1972 and 1976 Winter Olympics. Canada also waived their rights to host the 1970 World Championship, so it was held in Stockholm, Sweden instead.

Led by goaltender Vladislav Tretiak and forwards Valeri Kharlamov, Alexander Yakushev, Vladimir Petrov and Boris Mikhailov, the Soviet Union won gold at the 1970 and 1971 World Championships and the 1972 Winter Olympics. 1972 marked the first time that both the Olympics and World Championships were held in the same year as separate events. At the World Championships in Prague, the Czechoslovak team ended the Soviet team's streak and won their first gold since 1949. The Soviet team quickly returned to their winning ways, winning 1973 and 1974 World Championships. However, during the latter tournament, the Czechoslovak team defeated the Soviets 7–2. It was one of the biggest margins the Soviet team had ever lost by in an official game. The 1976 World Championships were held in Katowice, Poland. On the opening day of the tournament, Poland defeated the Soviet Union 6–4 thanks to a hat-trick from forward Wieslaw Jobczyk and the goaltending of Andrzej Tkacz. It was one of the biggest upsets in international hockey history; two months earlier at the 1976 Winter Olympics, Poland had lost 16–1 to the Soviets. The Soviets lost two more games and won the silver, and Czechoslovakia won gold. Poland finished seventh and was relegated to Pool B, the division in which teams play for ranking purposes and not the championship (now known as Division I).

=== 1976–1987: First years of open competition ===
Günther Sabetzki became president of the IIHF in 1975 and helped to resolve the dispute with the CAHA. The IIHF agreed to allow "open competition" of all players in the World Championships, and moved the competition to later in the season so players not involved in the NHL playoffs could participate. However, NHL players were still not allowed to play in the Olympics, because of both the unwillingness of the NHL to take a break mid-season and the IOC's strict amateur-only policy. The IIHF also agreed to endorse the Canada Cup, a competition meant to bring together the best players from the top hockey-playing countries.

The 1976 World Ice Hockey Championships in Katowice were the first to feature professionals although in the end only the United States made use of the new rule, recalling eight pros from the NHL's Minnesota North Stars and the WHA's Minnesota Fighting Saints. The first fully open World Championship was held in 1977 in Vienna, Austria, and saw the first participation of active Canadian NHL players, including two-time NHL MVP Phil Esposito. Sweden and Finland also augmented their rosters with a few NHL and WHA players. Many of the players on the Canadian team were not prepared for the tournament and were unfamiliar with the international game. The team finished fourth, losing both games to the Soviet Union by a combined score of 19–2. Czechoslovakia won gold, becoming the third team (after Canada and the Soviet Union) to win consecutive championships.

As a result of these events, full world championship status was given to the IIHF World Under-20 Championship, which had been held annually since 1974 as an unofficial invitational tournament. Colloquially known as the World Junior Ice Hockey Championship, the event was structured after the World Championships, but limited to players under the age of 20. The World Under-18 Championship was established in 1999 and typically held in April. It usually does not involve some of the top North American-based players because they are involved in junior league playoffs at the time.

Starting in 1978, the Soviet team won five consecutive World Championships, and had an unbeaten streak that lasted from 1981 through the 1984 Winter Olympics and until 1985. During that period, Canada remained competitive, winning three bronze medals. World Championship tournaments were not held in 1980, 1984 or 1988–the Olympic years.

The 1987 World Championships in Vienna were overshadowed by several controversies. At the beginning of the tournament, the roster of the West German team included Miroslav Sikora, a Polish-German forward who had previously played for Poland at the 1977 World Under-20 Championship. Sikora became a naturalized citizen of West Germany and played in the first three games, scoring a goal in a 3–1 win over Finland. Following the game, Finland launched a protest, demanding that the result be over-turned because the West Germans had used an ineligible player. At the time, players were not allowed to switch nationalities under any circumstances and the IIHF agreed to overturn the result and award the two points to Finland. This angered West German officials, who filed a protest in an Austrian court. The court agreed with the West Germans, overturning the IIHF decision and allowing them to keep their points. The result affected the final standings because had the IIHF's decision stood, Finland would have advanced to the medal round instead of Sweden. However, the Finns finished out of the medal round, and Sweden won their first gold medal since 1962. The tournament format also became controversial because the Soviet Union finished undefeated in the preliminary round but the Swedish team, which had lost three games in the preliminary round, won on goal differential because of a 9–0 win over Canada in the medal round.

=== 1989–1992: Fall of the Iron Curtain ===
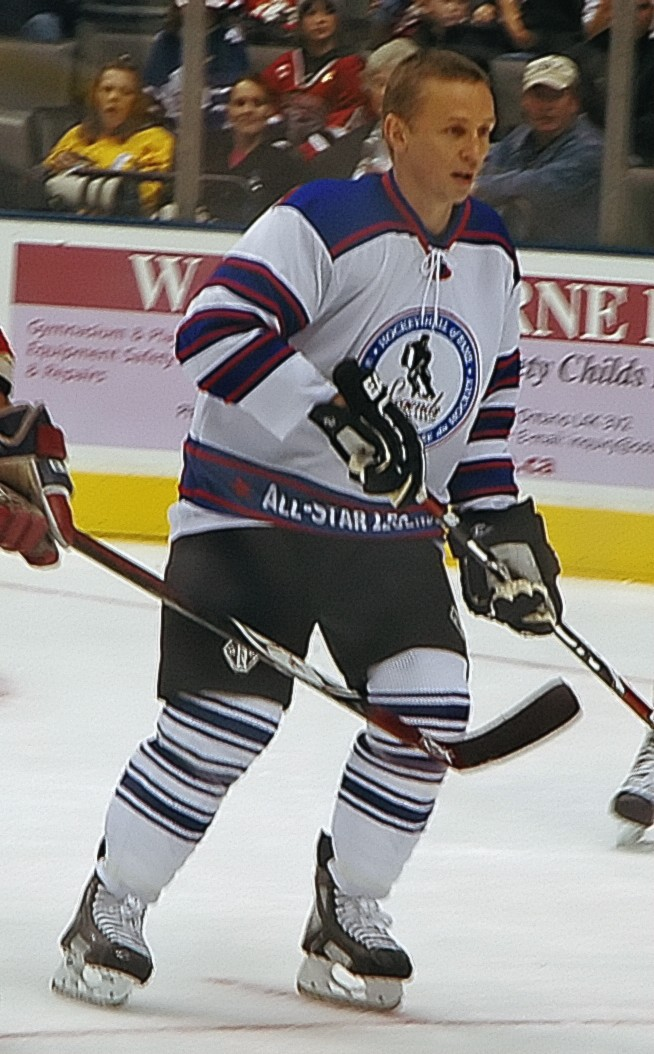
Soviet forward Igor Larionov won four World Championships before departing to play in the NHL in 1989.

Before 1989, players that lived in the Soviet Union, Czechoslovakia, and other nations behind the Iron Curtain were not allowed to leave and play in the NHL. In March 1989, Sergei Pryakhin became the first member of the Soviet national team who was permitted to play for a non-Soviet team. Several Soviet players, including Igor Larionov and Viacheslav Fetisov, wanted to leave and play in the NHL. Soviet officials agreed to allow players to leave if they played one final tournament with the national team. Players agreed to this, and the Soviet Union won its 21st World Championship. Shortly after, Soviet players began to flood into the NHL. Many of the Soviet Union's top players left, including the entire "Green Unit"–Larionov, Fetisov, Vladimir Krutov, Sergei Makarov and Alexei Kasatonov. The following year, the Soviet team won their final title at the 1990 World Championships. In 1991, Swedish forward Mats Sundin–the first European player to be drafted first overall in the NHL–led his team to the gold medal. The Soviets won bronze–the last medal the team would ever win.

The Soviet Union dissolved in December 1991. Nine former Soviet republics became part of the IIHF and began competing in international competitions, including Belarus, Kazakhstan, Latvia (which returned after a 52-year-long absence due to having been occupied by the Soviet Union) and Ukraine; the largest, Russia, succeeded the USSR. With this flood of new teams, the IIHF expanded the number of spots from eight to twelve. From 1963 to 1991, only four teams won a World Championship medal: the Soviet Union, Czechoslovakia (failing to win a medal only three times), Sweden and Canada. The Soviets won a medal in every tournament they participated in (1954 to 1991). At the 1992 World Championships, Sweden won their second consecutive gold. Finland won the silver medal, the nation's first ever World Championship medal (the Finnish team had previously won silver at the 1988 Winter Olympics).

=== 1993–present ===
Czechoslovakia split into the Czech Republic and Slovakia in January 1993. The IIHF recognized the Czech Republic's team as the successor to Czechoslovakia, and it retained its position in the top division while Slovakia's team began in the lowest division (Pool C) in 1994 and was forced to work its way up. Following this, the next decade was dominated by the so-called "Big Six"–Canada, the Czech Republic, Finland, Russia, Sweden and the United States. From 1992 to 1996, five different teams won the World Championship. At the 1993 World Championships, Russia won its first title as an independent nation and the Czech Republic won its first medal (bronze). In 1994, the Canadian team finished the preliminary round undefeated and defeated Finland in the final to win their first World Championship since 1961. The following year in Sweden, the Finnish team won its first ever World Championship. Led by their top line of Saku Koivu, Ville Peltonen and Jere Lehtinen, the Finns defeated rival Sweden in the gold medal game. At the 1995 Pool B championships, Slovakia, led by Peter Šťastný won Pool B and was promoted to the top division, where it has remained ever since. In 1996, the Czech Republic won its first World Championship as a separate country. During this period, the United States was the only one of the "Big Six" not to win the World Championship, although they did win the 1996 World Cup of Hockey and their bronze at that year's World Championship was their first medal since 1962. In the mid-1990s, several new teams such as Slovakia, Latvia, Belarus, Kazakhstan and Ukraine were quickly improving and older nations such as Austria, France, Italy, Norway and Switzerland were at risk of being relegated to Pool B. The IIHF feared that it would lose advertising revenue if that happened, so the number of teams was increased to 16 starting in 1998.

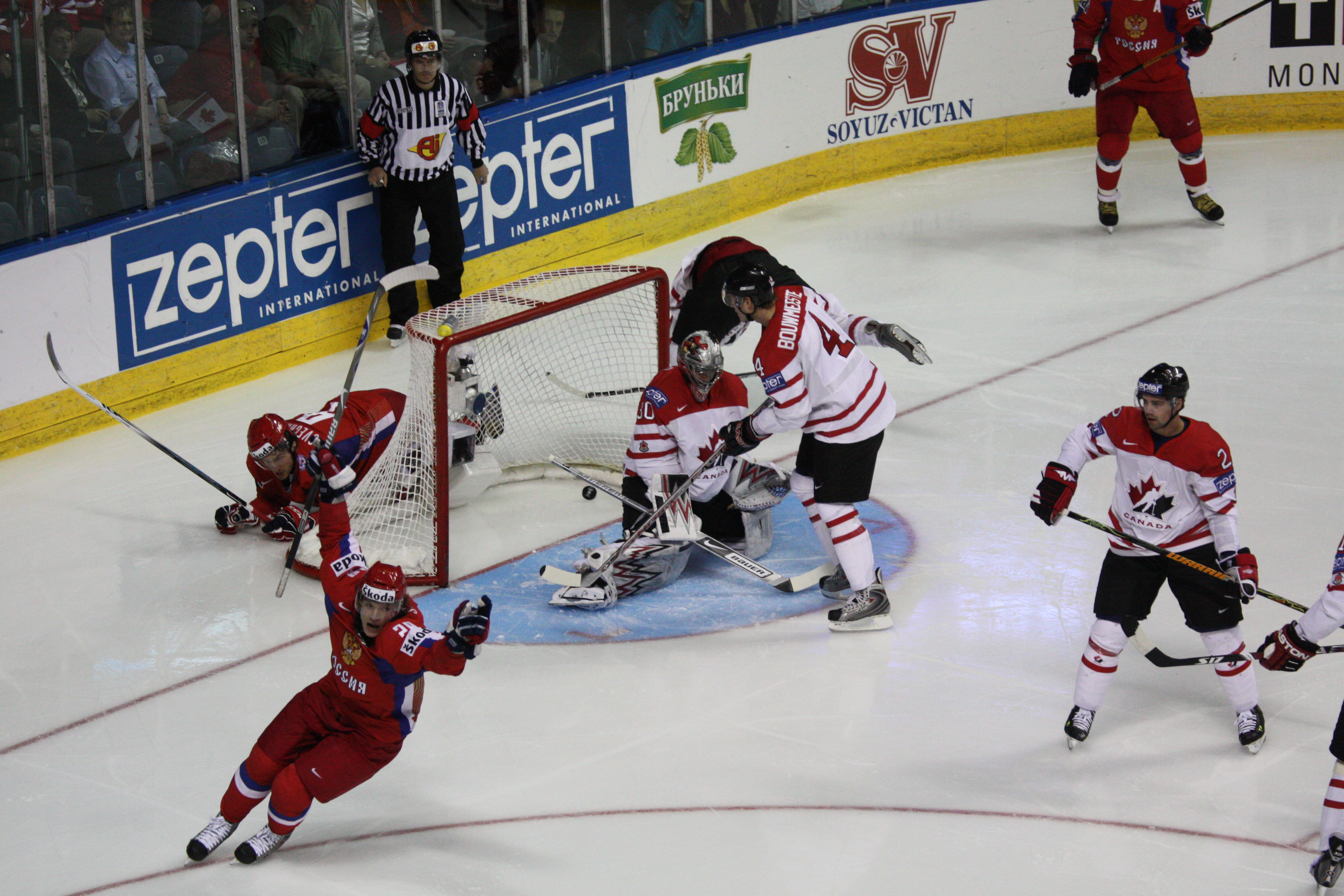
Alexander Semin scores a goal in the gold medal game between Canada and Russia at the 2008 World Championships.

From 1996 to 2001, the Czech Republic won six consecutive World Championship medals, including World Championship gold from 1999 to 2001, as well as gold at the 1998 Winter Olympics. In 2002, the Czechs were favoured to win, but were upset in the quarter final by Russia. In the gold medal game between Russia and Slovakia, Slovak Peter Bondra scored in the final two minutes of the game and the nation won its first ever World Championship. At the 2003 World Championships, Sweden made one of the biggest comebacks in tournament history, rallying from a 5–1 deficit in their quarterfinal game against Finland to win 6–5. The gold medal game between Canada and Sweden went into overtime. Canada's Anson Carter scored the winning goal 13 minutes into play, but the goal had to be reviewed for ten minutes to determine if the puck had crossed the line. In a rematch of the two nations the following year, Canada won and repeated as champions.

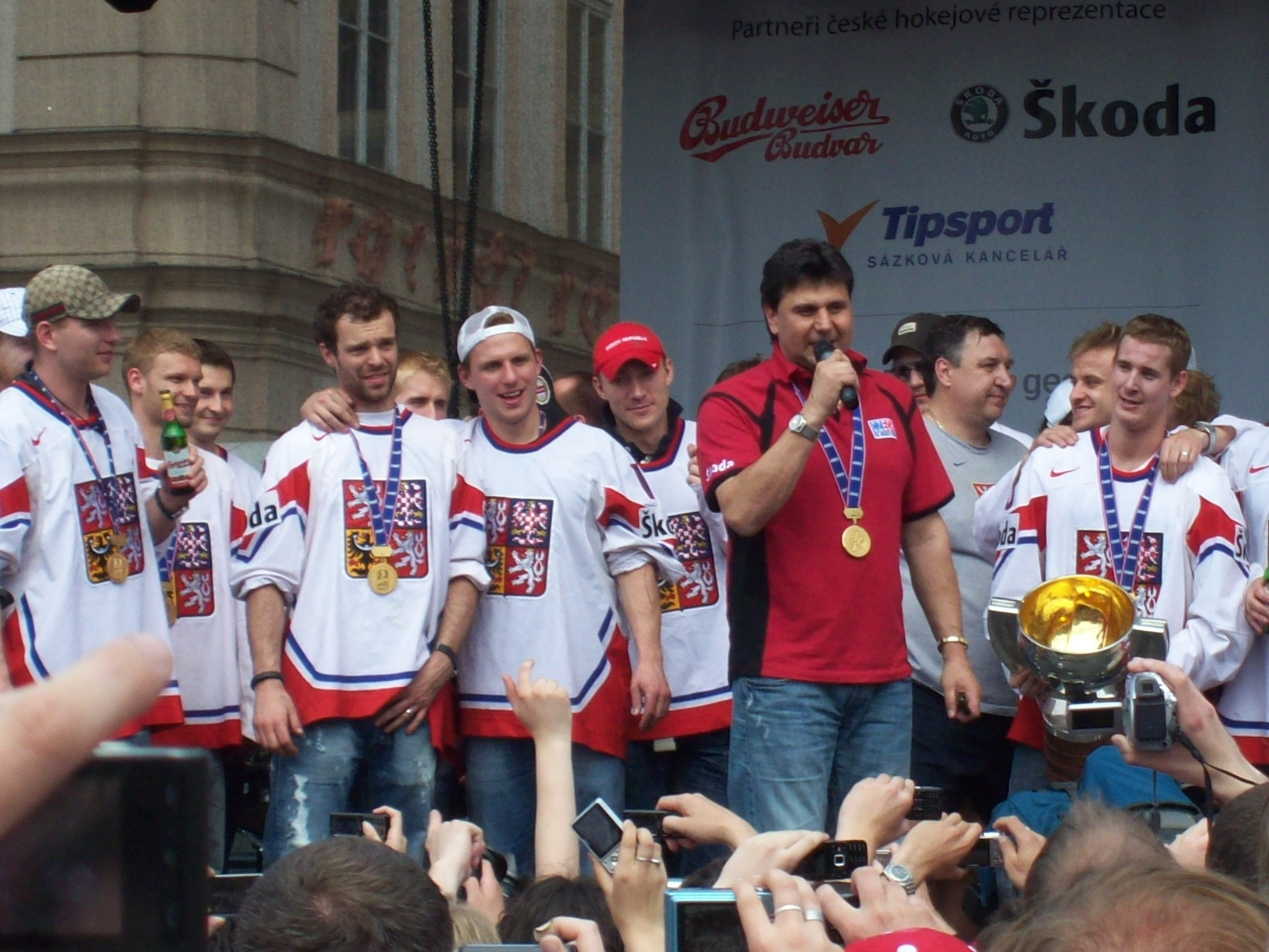
The Czech ice hockey world champions at Old Town Square (2010)

The 2004–05 NHL season was locked out, and eventually cancelled, because of a labour dispute between the league and the players. The 2005 World Championships, which featured more top players than normal, was won by the Czech Republic. At the 2006 Winter Olympics, Sweden won the gold medal over Finland. Three months later, Sweden defeated the Czech Republic and won the 2006 World Championships. They became the first team to win Olympic gold and a separate World Championship tournament in the same year. At the 2007 World Championship in Moscow, Canada defeated Finland to win the gold medal. The following year, the tournament was held in Canada for the first time. Russia defeated the home team to win their first gold medal since 1993. The Russian team successfully defended their title with a 2–1 win over Canada in 2009. In 2009, NHL Players' Association director Paul Kelly suggested that the World Championships be held every other year and that the NHL go on break to allow full player participation. IIHF president René Fasel responded that the tournament has television contracts and hosting commitments and that a large change would be difficult to put in place.

The 2010 tournament took place in Germany. The first game, between Germany and the United States, was played at Veltins-Arena in Gelsenkirchen and was attended by 77,803 people, setting a new record for the most attended game in hockey history. The tournament was noted for having several surprising preliminary round results, including: Switzerland beating Canada for the first time in World Championship play; Norway defeating eventual champions the Czech Republic; and Denmark upsetting Finland and the United States en route to their first ever quarterfinal appearance. The German team, which had finished 15th in 2009 and only avoided relegation to Division I because they were set to host the 2010 tournament, advanced to the semi-finals for the first time since the new playoff format was adapted. They finished fourth, losing to Sweden in the bronze medal game. In the gold medal game, the Czech Republic defeated the Russian team, winning gold.

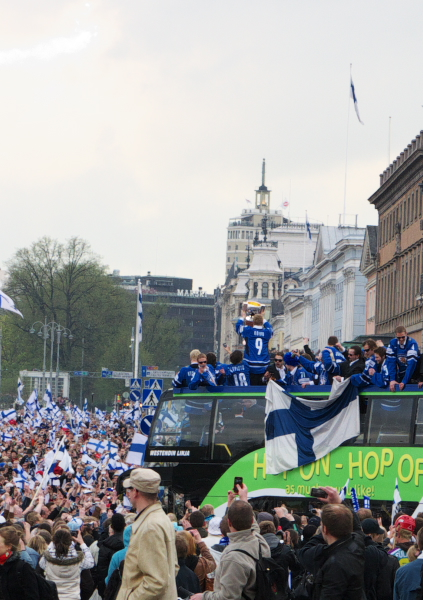
Finland gold medal celebrations at Market Square, Helsinki (2011)

The 2011 tournament was held in independent Slovakia for the first time. Finland won its second world championship with a 6–1 victory over Sweden. The Czech Republic won the bronze medal over Russia.

The 2012 tournament was held in Sweden and Finland. Russia beat Slovakia in the final, while the Czech Republic beat Finland in the bronze medal game.

In 2013, Switzerland finished the preliminary round undefeated before losing the gold medal game 5–1 to co-hosts Sweden. Switzerland's silver medal was the first for the nation since 1953. Sweden's gold made them the first team to win the tournament at home since the Soviet Union in 1986.

The 2014 tournament was held for the first time in independent Belarus in spite of concerns of the human rights abuses perpetrated by the authoritarian government. The tournament saw more upsets by the less prominent ice-hockey nations. France had beaten Canada for the second time in the modern history and made it to the quarterfinals. Eventual finalist Finland lost to Latvia and made it to the quarterfinals only due to a shootout win over Switzerland. The tournament was won by Russia (which had a stacked NHL squad compared to other teams who sent in younger players after the 2014 Winter Olympics), Finland won silver and Sweden won bronze defeating the Czech Republic.

The 2015 tournament was held in Prague and Ostrava, it was the most attended championship in history. It was to be the last appearance of Jaromír Jágr on the Czech national hockey team, and the home crowd had great expectations for its national team, who had failed to win a gold medal since 2010, matching its longest run without a win since the break-up of Czechoslovakia. However, the tournament was dominated by an excellent Canadian team, which went undefeated and beat Russia 6–1 in the gold medal match. Its captain, Sidney Crosby joined the Triple Gold Club, becoming the first player to achieve that honour as captain of each winning team. The bronze was won by the United States, leaving the Czechs with a second consecutive fourth place.

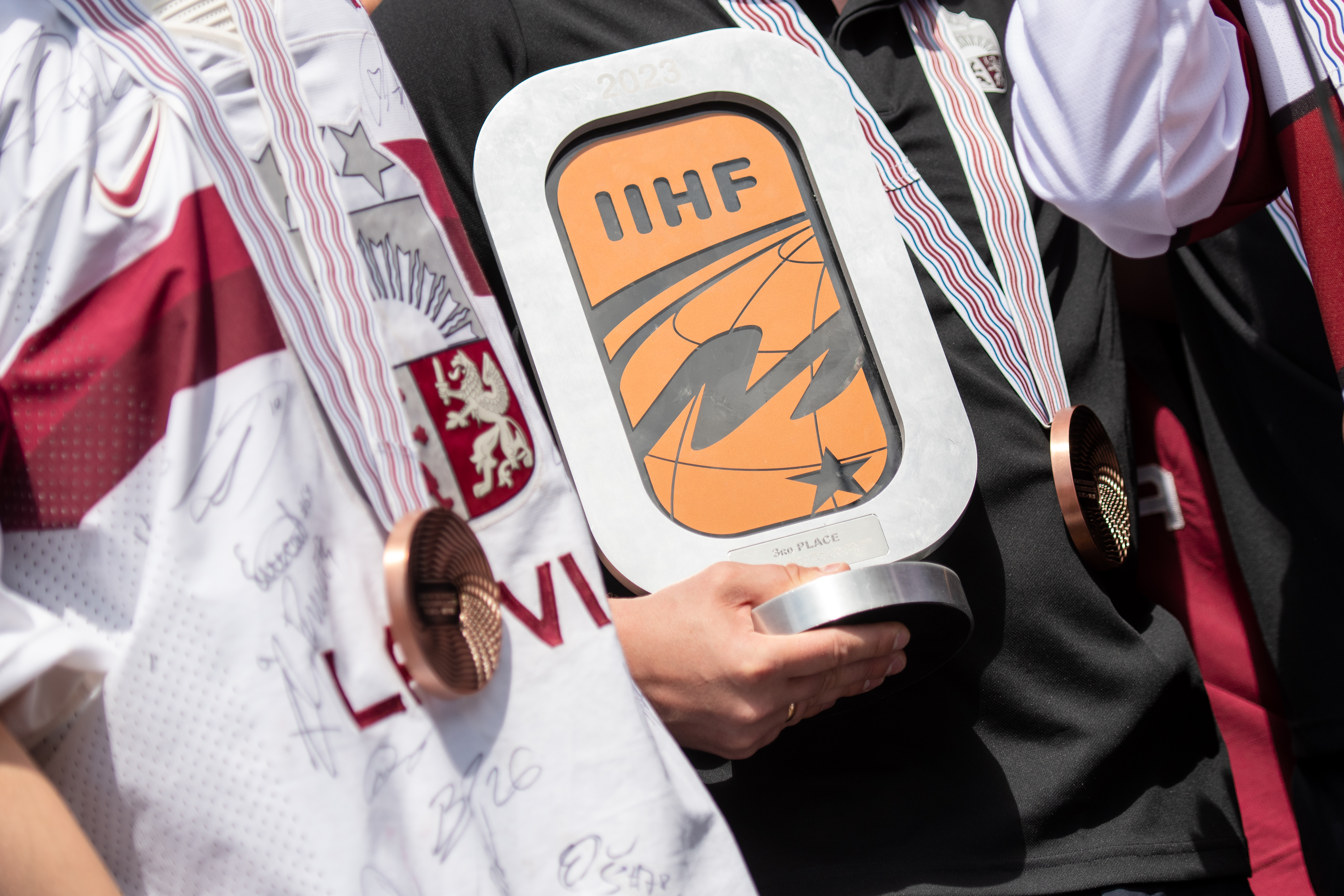
IIHF third place trophy

The 2020 tournament was cancelled due to the COVID-19 pandemic.

== Tournament structure ==
=== History ===
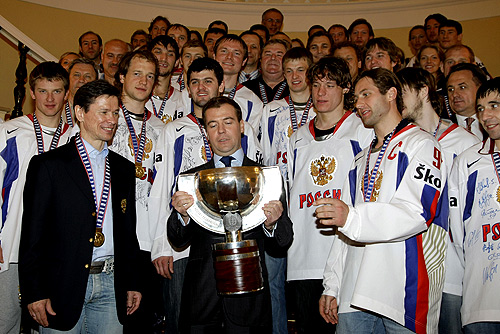
Members of the 2008 World Champion Russian team with President Dmitry Medvedev.

The first World Championship to be held as an individual event was in 1930. Twelve different nations participated. Canada's team was given a bye to the gold medal game, and the rest of the nations played an elimination tournament to determine which nation would also play for the gold.

In 1931, the World Championships switched to a similar format to what was used at the Olympics. Ten teams played series of round-robin format qualifying rounds were played to determine which nations participated in the medal round. Medals were awarded based on the final standings of the teams in the medal round. The format was changed several times in the 1930s, in some years there was a gold medal game, while in others the gold medal was awarded based on points.

In 1937, the tournament format was again switched to being similar to the version used at the Olympics. A preliminary round involving 11 teams was played, then the top four advanced to the medal round and medals were awarded based on points; no gold medal game was played. A gold medal game was played in 1938; it was the last gold medal game played in the World Championships until 1992.

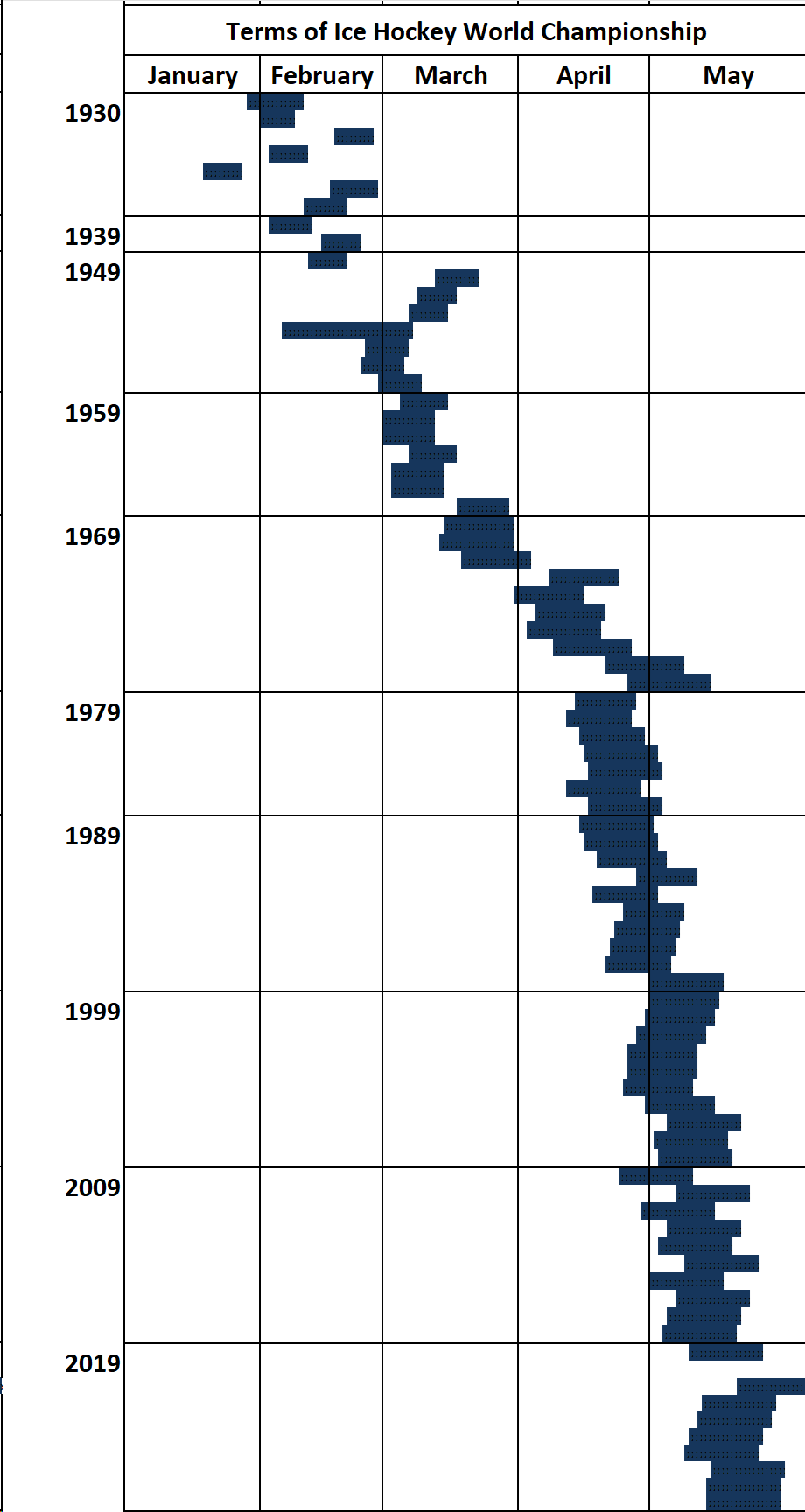
Timing of annual Champion Group tournament

In 1951, thirteen nations took part and were split into two groups. The top seven teams (Pool A) played for the World Championship. The other six (Pool B) played for ranking purposes. Generally eight teams played in the top-level Championship, although the number varied over the years, going as low as three (in 1953) and as high as twelve (in 1959). The same format was used until 1992. The format was criticized because often the gold medal winner was decided before the final game was played, such as at the 1988 Winter Olympics.

During a congress in 1990, the IIHF introduced a playoff system.

As the IIHF grew, more teams began to participate at the World Championships, so more pools were introduced. Pool C games were first played in 1961 and Pool D was introduced in 1987. In 2001, the pools were renamed: Pool B became Division I, Pool C became Division II and Pool D became Division III.

=== Modern Champion Group, Division I, II and III format ===
The modern format for the World Championship features a minimum of 52 teams: 16 teams in the main championship group, 12 teams in Division I, 12 teams in Division II and 12 teams in Division III. If there are more than 52 teams, the rest compete in Division IV.

From 2000 to 2011, the teams were divided into four groups and played each other in a round robin format preliminary round, and the top 3 teams in each group advance into the qualifying round. The qualifying round is another round of group play with two groups of six, with the top four teams in each group advancing into the knockout playoff stage. The bottom four teams in the preliminary round played in another group as well; this group determined relegation. After a round-robin format, the bottom two teams were usually relegated to play in Division I the following year.

From 1998 and 2004, the IIHF held a "Far East" qualifying tournament for Asian teams with an automatic berth in the championship division on the line. Japan always won this tournament, but finished last at every World Championship except in 2004, when they finished 15th. The IIHF discontinued the qualifying tournament following the 2004 tournament, and Japan was relegated to compete in Division I.

=== Champion group format from 2012 ===
The main group features 16 teams. The 16 teams are split into two groups based on their world ranking. The ranking is based on the standings of the last Winter Olympics and the last four World Championships. The results of more recent tournaments have a higher weight in the ranking. The last World Championship has 100% value, the tournament before 75% and so on. The Olympic tournament has the same value as the World Championship the same year.

Beginning with the 2012 tournament, the qualifying round was eliminated, and the 16 teams divided into two groups of eight, with each team playing seven games in the preliminary round.

The top four teams from these groups advance to the knockout playoff stage. In the quarterfinals, the first place team from one group plays the fourth place team from the opposite group, and the second place team from one group plays the third place team from the opposite group. The winners advanced to the semi-finals. In cases where the quarter-final venues were deemed too far apart to allow easy travel between them, the teams stay within their groups for the quarters. The winners of the quarter-finals advance to the semi-finals, with the winners of the semi-finals advancing to the gold medal game and the losers advancing to the bronze medal game.

Also starting in 2012, the relegation round was eliminated. Instead, the eighth-place team in each group was relegated to Division I.

=== Division I, II and III formats from 2012 ===
Division I is split into two groups of six, both groups play in round robin tournaments independent of each other and the championship division. Previously the top team from both groups was promoted to the championship, while the bottom team was relegated to Division II. Beginning in 2012, the top two teams from the 'A' group were promoted to the championship, the bottom team was exchanged with the group 'B' winner, and that group's last place team was sent to Division II.

Division II works similarly to Division I, with two six-team groups where group 'A' promotes one team to Division I and group 'B' exchanges its last placed team with Division III. Division III is now composed of one group of six, and if more than six nations register for this, the lowest level, then a qualification tournament will be held.

=== Division IV from 2020 ===
The IIHF introduced Division IV, intended to debut in the 2020 tournament, but cancelled due to COVID-19. Kyrgyzstan hosted the inaugural Division IV Championship in 2022.

== Rules ==
=== Game rules ===
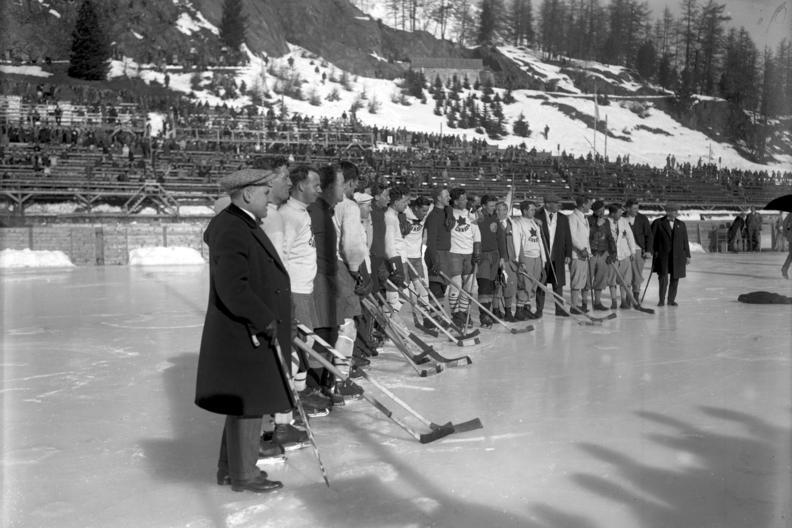
A game between Canada and Sweden during the 1928 Winter Olympics.

At the first tournament in 1920, there were many differences from the modern game: games were played outdoors on natural ice, forward passes were not allowed, the rink was 56x18 metres (the current International standard is 61x30 metres) and two twenty-minute periods were played. Each side had seven players on the ice, the extra position being the rover. Following the tournament, the IIHF held a congress and decided to adopt the "Canadian rules"–six men per side and three periods of play.

At an IIHF congress in 1969, officials voted to allow body-checking in all three zones in a rink similar to the NHL. Prior to that, body-checking was only allowed in the defending zone in international hockey. The IIHF later described the rule change as "arguably the most substantial and dramatic rule changes in the history of international hockey" because it allowed for a more aggressive game. The rule, which was first applied at the 1970 World Championships, was controversial: IIHF president Bunny Ahearne feared it would make ice hockey "a sport for goons." Several other rule changes were implemented in the early 1970s: players were required to wear helmets starting in 1970 and goaltender masks became mandatory in 1972. In 1992, the IIHF switched to using a playoff system to determine medalists and decided that tie games in the medal round would be decided in a shootout. The IIHF decided to test a new rule in 1997 that would allow two-line passes. Prior to that, the neutral zone trap had slowed the game down and reduced scoring. At the 1997 World Championships, teams were allowed to decide if they wanted to test the rule. Although no team accepted the offer, the rule was adopted. The IIHF described it as "the most revolutionary rule change since allowing body-checking in all three zones in 1969. [...] The new rule almost immediately changed the game for the better. The 1999 IIHF World Championship in Norway was a stark contrast to the finals the year before with many more goals scored and with end-to-end action – not defence – dominating play."

The current IIHF rules differ slightly from the rules used in the NHL. One difference between NHL and IIHF rules is rink dimensions: the NHL rink is narrower, measuring 61x26 metres (200x85 feet), instead of the international size of 61x30.5metres (200x100feet). Another rule difference between the NHL and the IIHF rules concerns how icings are called. As of the 2013–14 regular NHL season, a linesman stops play due to icing using the hybrid icing method, instead of the former method, where a defending player (other than the goaltender) touched the puck before an attacking player was able to, in contrast to the IIHF rules that use "no-touch" icing, where play is stopped the moment the puck crosses the goal line. The NHL and IIHF differ also in penalty rules. The NHL, in addition to the minor and double minor penalties called in IIHF games, calls major penalties which are more dangerous infractions of the rules, such as fighting, and have a duration of five minutes. This is in contrast to the IIHF rule, in which players who fight are ejected from the game.

Since the 2005–06 season, the NHL instituted several new rules. Some of them were already used by the IIHF, such as the shootout and making the two-line pass legal. Others which were not picked up by the IIHF, such as requiring smaller goaltender equipment and the addition of the goaltender trapezoid to the rink. However, the IIHF did agree to follow the NHL's league's zero-tolerance policy on obstruction and required referees to call more hooking, holding and interference penalties. In 2006, the IIHF voted to eliminate tie games and institute a three-point system: wins in regulation time would be worth three points, overtime wins would be two points and over-time losses would be worth one point. The system was first used at the 2007 World Championships.

As of 2019, all overtime periods use a 3-on-3, golden goal format, with the length of the period dependent on the round; preliminary round games use one 5-minute period, followed by a shootout if necessary. From the quarter-finals onward, the overtime period is extended to 10 minutes. In the gold medal game, a shootout is not used: 20-minute 3-on-3 periods are played until the game-winning goal is scored.

=== Player eligibility ===
The World Championships have been open to all players, both professional and amateur, since 1977. The IIHF lists the following requirements for a player to be eligible to play:

- "Each player must be under the jurisdiction of an IIHF member national association."
- "Each player must be a citizen of the country he represents."
- Each player must be at least 18 years of age on the day the respective championship starts, or be at least 16 and obtain an under age waiver

If a player who has never played in an IIHF competition changes their citizenship, they must participate in national competitions in their new country for at least two consecutive years and have an international transfer card (ITC). If a player who has previously played in an IIHF tournament wishes to change their national team, they must have played in their new country for four years. A player can only do this once.

As this tournament takes place during the same time period as the NHL's Stanley Cup playoffs, NHL players generally only become available if their respective NHL team missed the playoffs, or once they have been eliminated from Stanley Cup contention. It is therefore common for several NHL players to join the World Championships while the tournament is already in progress.

== Divisions ==
Winners of the Ice Hockey World Championships with number of wins. (Note: Note that championships won by the Soviet Union are credited to Russia, and those of Czechoslovakia are counted for the Czech Republic.) 1 2–4 5–9 10–24 25+

As of 2020, the IIHF World Championships are split into five different divisions. This is the alignment of the divisions, accurate as of the 2018 IIHF World Ranking. Teams that are not ranked are not included here, for a full list of IIHF members, see List of members of the International Ice Hockey Federation.

Keys:

Promoted
Never been promoted/relegated (began in that division/group)
Relegated

E.G.; 1953 – this means that the team was relegated to that division for the 1953 competition, and have been there ever since.

=== Championship ===
The Championship division comprises the top sixteen hockey nations in the world. The 89th championship will be held from 15 to 31 May 2026, in Fribourg, and Zurich, Switzerland.

Teams for the 2026 IIHF World Championship are:

Nation	Group (as of 2026)	IIHF Ranking (as of May 2026)	Member of IIHF since	Member of division since	Ref.
Austria	Group B	12	1912	2022	
Canada	Group B	2	1920	1951	
Czech Republic	Group A	6	1908^{[A]}	1993	
Denmark	Group A	10	1946	2003	
Finland	Group B	4	1928	1951	
Germany	Group B	7	1909	2007	
Great Britain	Group B	18	1908	2026	
Hungary	Group B	17	1927	2025	
Italy	Group A	16	1924	2026	
Latvia	Group B	9	1931	1997	
Norway	Group A	11	1935	2006	
Slovakia	Group A	8	1993	1996	
Slovenia	Group A	13	1992	2025	
Sweden	Group A	5	1912	1951	
Switzerland	Group B	1	1908	1998	
United States	Group A	3	1920	1985	
Belarus	Suspended^{[C]}	NR	1992	2020	
Russia	Suspended^{[C]}	NR	1952^{[B]}	1992	

A. The IIHF recognizes Bohemia, which joined in 1908, and Czechoslovakia as the predecessors to the Czech Republic, which officially became a member in 1993.
B. The IIHF recognizes the Soviet Union, which joined in 1952, as the predecessor to Russia, which officially became a member in 1992.
C. On 28 February 2022, IIHF decided to expel Russia and Belarus from the tournament due to the Russian invasion of Ukraine.

=== Division I ===
Division I comprises twelve teams. Group A teams compete for promotion to the Elite Division with the loser being relegated to Division I Group B. Group B teams compete for promotion to Division I Group A while the loser is relegated to Division II Group A. In 2026, Group A games will be played in Sosnowiec, Poland from 2 to 8 May, and Group B games will be played in Shenzhen, China from 29 April to 5 May.

Table updated 1 June 2025

Nation	Group (as of 2026)	IIHF Ranking (as of 2025)	Member of IIHF since	Member of division since	Member of group since	Ref.
France	Group A	15	1908	2026	2026	
Japan	Group A	22	1930	2005	2024	
Kazakhstan	Group A	14	1992	2026	2026	
Lithuania	Group A	26	1938	2005	2026	
Poland	Group A	21	1926	2025	2025	
Ukraine	Group A	24	1992	2008	2025	
China	Group B	27	1963	2023	2023	
Estonia	Group B	28	1935	2015	2015	
Netherlands	Group B	30	1935	2026	2026	
Romania	Group B	23	1924	2018	2026	
South Korea	Group B	25	1960	2019	2025	
Spain	Group B	29	1923	2024	2024	

=== Division II ===
Division II comprises twelve teams. Group A teams compete for promotion to Division I Group B with the loser being relegated to Division II Group B. Group B teams compete for promotion to Division II Group A while the loser is relegated to Division III. In 2026, Group A games will be played in Al-Ain, United Arab Emirates from 20 to 26 April and Group B games will be played in Sofia, Bulgaria from 6 to 12 April.

Table updated 1 June 2025

Nation	Group (as of 2026)	IIHF Ranking (as of 2025)	Member of IIHF since	Member of division since	Member of group since	Ref.
Australia	Group A	36	1938	2013	2017	
Belgium	Group A	37	1908	2005	2025	
Croatia	Group A	31	1992	2026	2026	
Georgia	Group A	47	2009	2019	2026	
Serbia	Group A	32	1939^{[D]}	2024	2024	
United Arab Emirates	Group A	34	2001	2023	2024	
Bulgaria	Group B	38	1960	2020	2020	
Chinese Taipei	Group B	40	1983	2024	2024	
Iceland	Group B	35	1992	2007	2025	
Israel	Group B	33	1991	2012	2026	
Kyrgyzstan	Group B	43	2019	2026	2026	
New Zealand	Group B	39	1977	2010	2013	

D. The IIHF recognizes Yugoslavia, which joined in 1939, and Serbia and Montenegro as the predecessors to Serbia, which officially became a member in 2007.

=== Division III ===
Division III comprises twelve teams. Group A teams compete for promotion to Division II Group B with the loser being relegated to Division III Group B. Group B teams compete for promotion to Division III Group A while the loser is relegated to Division IV. In 2026, Group A games will be played in Cape Town, South Africa from 13 to 19 April and Group B games will be played in Hong Kong from 13 to 19 April.

Table updated 1 June 2025

Nation	Group (as of 2026)	IIHF Ranking (as of 2025)	Member of IIHF since	Member of division since	Member of group since	Ref.
Bosnia and Herzegovina	Group A	49	2001	2015	2025	
Mexico	Group A	45	1985	2024	2026	
South Africa	Group A	48	1937	2020	2023	
Thailand	Group A	42	1989	2026	2026	
Turkey	Group A	41	1991	2025	2025	
Turkmenistan	Group A	44	2015	2019	2022	
Hong Kong, China	Group B	50	1983	2019	2022	
Luxembourg	Group B	46	1912	2019	2026	
Mongolia	Group B	53	1999	2025	2025	
North Korea	Group B	54	1963	2020	2024	
Philippines	Group B	52	2016	2024	2024	
Uzbekistan	Group B	59	2019	2026	2026	

=== Division IV ===
Division IV teams compete for promotion to Division III Group B.

Table updated 1 June 2025

Nation	IIHF Ranking (as of 2026)	Member of IIHF since	Member of division since	Ref.
Armenia	60	1999	2025	
Indonesia	58	2016	2023	
Iran	56	2019	2025	
Kuwait	55	2018	2020	
Malaysia	57	2006	2024	
Singapore	51	2017	2026	

== Directorate awards ==
Since 1954, the IIHF has given awards for play during the World Championship tournament. Voted on by the tournament directorate, the first awards recognised the top goaltender, forward and defenceman. In 1999, an award for the most valuable player was added. There is also an all-star team voted on by members of the media. In 2004, Canadian Dany Heatley became the first player to lead in scoring, win the MVP award, win the best forward award and be named to the all-star team in the same year. He repeated the feat in 2008.

== Attendance ==
The highest total attendance at a championship was 797,727 spectators in 2024, and the second highest was 741,690 spectators in 2015. Both of these tournaments were held in the Czech Republic. The 2024 edition also had the highest number of spectators per game at 12,464.

== Player records ==
All records are according to the IIHF and as of 2025.

Record	Number	Held by	Team
Top division records
Most tournaments	20	Andres Ambühl	Switzerland
Most games played	151	Andres Ambühl	Switzerland
Most points	164	Boris Mikhailov	Soviet Union
Most gold medals	10	Alexander Ragulin	Soviet Union
Most gold medals	10	Vladislav Tretiak	Soviet Union
Most medals in total	13	Jiří Holík	Czechoslovakia
Most medals in total	13	Vladislav Tretiak	Soviet Union

== See also ==
- List of IIHF World Championship medalists
- IIHF Women's World Championship
- Ice hockey at the Olympic Games
- 4 Nations Cup
- List of IIHF World Championships by attendance
- List of IIHF World Junior Championship medalists
- IIHF World U18 Championship
- IIHF U18 Women's World Championship
- World Para Ice Hockey Championships

== Bibliography ==
- Boer, Peter (2006). The Calgary Flames. Overtime Books. ISBN 1-897277-07-5.
- MacSkimming, Roy (1996). Cold War. Vancouver, British Columbia: Greystone Books. ISBN 1-55054-473-X.
- Pincus, Arthur (2006). The Official Illustrated NHL History. Reader's Digest. ISBN 0-88850-800-X.
- Szemberg, Szymon; Podnieks, Andrew (2008). IIHF Top 100 Hockey Stories of All-Time. H. B. Fenn & Company, Ltd. ISBN 978-1-55168-358-4.
- Wong, John Chi-Kit (2001). The Development of Professional Hockey and the Making of the National Hockey League. University of Maryland, College Park. ISBN 978-0-493-36894-8.
