= Tkocz =

Tkocz is a Polish occupational surname, Silesian variant of Tkacz, 'veawer'. Archaic feminine forms, still used colloquially: Tkoczowa (by husband), Tkoczówna (by father). Outside Poland it may assume forms Tkotz, Tkotsch. Notable people with the surname include:

- Andrzej Tkocz (born 1951), Polish speedway rider
- Jarosław Tkocz (born 1973), Polish footballer
- Stanisław Tkocz (1936–2016), Polish speedway rider
