= Tkotsch =

Tkotsch is a German surname, a Germanized from of the Silesian form Tkocz of the Polish surname Tkacz, literally 'veawer'. Notable people with the surname include:

- Sarah Tkotsch (born 1988), German actress and voice actress .
- Sina Tkotsch (born 1990), German actress
- Paul Tkotsch (1895–1963), German Roman Catholic clergyman and auxiliary bishop in the archdiocese of Berlin
