= Tkaczyk =

Tkaczyk is a Polish occupational surname meaning "weaver". Notable people with this surname include:

- Andrew Tkaczyk, Polish American musician
- Cecilia Tkaczyk (born 1961), Polish American politician
- Dariusz Tkaczyk, Polish musician
- Grzegorz Tkaczyk (born 1980), Polish handball player
- Roman Tkaczyk (born 1954), Polish gymnast
- Waldemar Tkaczyk, Polish musician

== See also ==
- Tkacz
