= List of IIHF World Championships by attendance =

A list of the top 30 most attended IIHF World Championships (out of 89 total). The 2024 tournament, in Prague and Ostrava (Czech Republic), holds the record for overall attendance and the record for average spectators per game. Not included are the Olympic tournaments, which though they are run as an IIHF tournament, have been separate from the World Championships since 1972.

Despite reluctance in some circles to have such a tournament in Olympic years, three of the six most attended World Championships overall have taken place on years that coincided with the holding of a best-on-best tournament, either the Olympics (2010 and 2014) or the World Cup of Hockey (2004).

It should be considered that because of a changing pool-size of teams through the years, the number of games contested at the IIHF World Championships can range from 30 in 1973 to 64 in 2012 and beyond, therefore "attendance per game" is an equally important statistic to measure the success of a given tournament. Fourteen tournaments have had averages over 9,000 spectators per game (including 1972 edition which is not the top 30 most attended tournaments by total attendance), and eight have topped the 10,000 mark.

In an effort to broaden the sport's appeal, the number of top division teams was increased from a mere 8 (as late as 1991) to 16 (starting in 1998), leading to an influx of lesser teams that could negatively impact average attendance. To combat this, some organizers have aggressively pushed the sale of day passes that bundle popular games with less sought-after ones.

Czech Republic hosted six of the top 30 most attended tournaments (including three tournaments held in Czechoslovakia) as well as three of the top 5 attended tournaments. Finland also hosted six of the top 30 most attended tournaments. There are two countries with five of the top 30 most attended tournaments: Russia (including three tournaments held in the Soviet Union) and Sweden. Germany hosted three of the top 30 most attended tournaments; Denmark, Slovakia and Switzerland – two each. There are 4 other countries who have hosted the championships at least once, and are represented on the top 30.

The lowest attendance was at the 2021 edition in Latvia, where fans were banned due to the COVID-19 pandemic except for one game attended by 934 people. Not counting this, the lowest recorded attendance was at the 1953 edition in Switzerland, with 53,000 total spectators. Some tournaments before 1950 do not have attendance figures available.

== List of the top 30 most attended tournaments ==
Year	Host country	Total attendance	Number of games	Attendance per game	Ref
2024	Czech Republic †	797,727	64	12,464	
2015	Czech Republic	741,690	64	11,589	
2017	Germany & France	686,391	64	10,725	
2014	Belarus	640,044	64	10,001	
2004	Czech Republic	552,097	56	9,859	
2010	Germany	548,768	56	9,799	
1997	Finland	526,172	52	10,119	
2018	Denmark	520,481	64	8,133	
2025	Sweden & Denmark	489,450	64	7,648	
2008	Canada	477,040	54	8,834	
2019	Slovakia	470,853	64	7,357	
2026	Switzerland	466,314	64	7,286	
2012	Finland & Sweden	451,054	64	7,048	
2003	Finland	449,193	56	8,021	
2023	Finland & Latvia	441,184	64	6,904	
2013	Sweden † & Finland	427,818	64	6,685	
2016	Russia	417,414	64	6,522	
1985	Czechoslovakia †	411,659	40	10,291	
2001	Germany	407,542	56	7,278	
2011	Slovakia	406,804	56	7,264	
1959	Czechoslovakia	406,601	48	8,471	
1989	Sweden	388,563	40	9,714	
2009	Switzerland	379,044	56	6,768	
1986	Soviet Union †	375,820	40	9,396	
1978	Czechoslovakia	362,642	40	9,066	
2022	Finland †	356,955	64	5,577	
1979	Soviet Union †	354,500	32	11,078	
1973	Soviet Union †	331,500	30	11,050	
2007	Russia	330,708	56	5,905	
1995	Sweden	326,571	40	8,164	

† = team won the championship as host

== See also ==
- List of IIHF World Championship medalists
- Ice Hockey World Championships
