= Ice hockey rules =

Set of rules applicable to the sport of ice hockey

Ice hockey rules define the parameters of the sport of ice hockey. The sport is governed by several organizations including the International Ice Hockey Federation (IIHF), the National Hockey League (NHL), Professional Women's Hockey League (PWHL), Hockey Canada, USA Hockey and others. The rules define the size of the hockey rink where a game is played, the playing and safety equipment, the game definition, including time of play and whether tie-breaking methods are used and the actual playing rules themselves. The IIHF rule book is used in both amateur and professional leagues worldwide. The NHL's rule book is the basis for the rule books of most North American professional leagues. The IIHF, amateur and NHL rules evolved separately from amateur and professional Canadian ice hockey rules of the early 1900s.

Hockey Canada rules define the majority of the amateur games played in Canada. USA Hockey defines the same for the United States (US). US high school leagues use the National Federation of State High School Associations rule book, and varsity college hockey is governed by the National Collegiate Athletic Association's rules.

Hockey Canada and USA Hockey's rule books differ primarily in technical matters such as the severity of penalties handed out for various fouls. IIHF rules differ a bit more due to the differences in the dimensions of North American hockey rinks from those in the rest of the world. In recent times, both USA Hockey and Hockey Canada have been trying to make their rules more similar to the international rules. The merits of this move toward a more standardized rule book, but are debated in amateur hockey circles.

In recent years, the low scores of NHL games have prompted the league to debate a wide variety of rule change proposals including enlarging the size of the goal, widening the blue and red lines to create a larger offensive zone, restricting where goaltenders can handle the puck, breaking ties with a penalty shot shootout, and eliminating the two-line pass rule.

== See also ==
- Ice hockey statistics
- National Hockey League rules
