= Tkacz =

Tkacz is a Polish occupational surname meaning "weaver". Archaic feminine forms, still used colloquially: Tkaczowa (by husband), Tkaczówna (by father). Outside Poland it may assume forms Tkatz, Tkatsch. "Tkaczowa" may also be used as a translation of Russian surname Tkachyova. Notable people with this surname include:

- Andrzej Tkacz (born 1946), Polish ice hockey player
- Dawid Tkacz (born 2005), Polish footballer
- Małgorzata Tkacz-Janik (born 1965), Polish feminist and politician
- Nathaniel Tkacz, Swedish-Australian academic
- Virlana Tkacz (born 1952), American theatre director
- Wojciech Tkacz (born 1969), Polish ice hockey player

== See also ==
- Tkaczyk
