= National Hockey League rules =

Rules governing the play of the National Hockey League

Diagram of a regulation NHL ice hockey rink.

The National Hockey League rules are the rules governing the play of the National Hockey League (NHL), a professional ice hockey organization. Infractions of the rules, such as offside and icing, lead to a stoppage of play and subsequent face-offs, while more serious infractions lead to penalties being assessed to the offending team. The league also determines the specifications for playing equipment used in its games.

The rules are one of the two standard sets of ice hockey rules in the world. The rules themselves have evolved directly from the first organized indoor ice hockey game in Montreal in 1875, updated by subsequent leagues up to 1917, when the league adopted the existing National Hockey Association set of rules. While designed to govern play of games organized by the league, the NHL's rules are the basis for rules governing most ice hockey leagues in North America.

The rules differ slightly from the rules used in international games organized by the International Ice Hockey Federation (IIHF) such as the Olympics (the NHL rules, however, are used in the World Cup of Hockey). The IIHF rules are themselves also based on Canadian rules of ice hockey dating back to the early 20th century. The NHL and IIHF differ in the treatment of fighting and in playing rules, such as icing, the areas of play for goaltenders, helmet rules, officiating rules, timeouts and play reviews.

== Hockey rink ==
Near each end of the rink there is a red goal line spanning the width of the ice. It is used to judge goals and icing calls.

New since the 2005–06 NHL season, after testing in the American Hockey League, a trapezoid is marked behind each goalie net. The goalie can play the puck only within that area or in front of the goal line. If he plays the puck behind the goal line and not in the trapezoid, a 2-minute minor penalty for delay of game is assessed. This rule is widely referred to as the "Brodeur rule", after New Jersey Devils goalie Martin Brodeur, whose puck handling behind the net is believed to be the cause for the rule. In 2014, the NHL lengthened the goal-line side of the trapezoid by 2 feet (0.61 m) on both sides of the net.

== Game timing ==
Between stoppages of play, teams have 18 seconds (five seconds for the visiting team, eight seconds for the home team, five seconds to line up at the faceoff location) to substitute their players, except during TV timeouts. TV timeouts are two minutes long, and occur three times per period, during normal game stoppages after the 6, 10, and 14 minute marks of the period, unless it is during a power play, a goal that has just been scored, or the stoppage was as a result of an icing. Each team may also take one 30 second time-out, but it may only be taken during a normal stoppage of play. Each period, teams alternate the goal they defend, therefore changing attacking directions.

== Scoring ==
A goal is scored when the puck passes entirely across the red line painted between the goal posts and below the crossbar.

A goal may be disallowed under the following circumstances:

1. The scoring team takes a penalty (except if the other team puts the puck into its own net untouched by the team to be penalized)
2. The puck is directed in by an attacker's high stick (above the crossbar)
3. The puck has been directed, batted, thrown or kicked into the net by an attacking player other than with a stick (angling one's skate so the puck deflects off it into the goal is allowed)
4. Goaltender interference (which can also result in a penalty)
5. The puck goes in after a referee intends to stop play (e.g. the net has been dislodged)
6. The puck deflects off a referee or linesman and goes directly into the goal (exception to the rule that a puck hitting a referee or a linesman is still live)
7. A goal was allowed at the other end (this can happen if a video review clarifies a goal scored prior, as happened in a game on November 15, 2010, between the Los Angeles Kings and San Jose Sharks)
8. If a linesman reports to the referee (a) a double-minor for high-sticking, (b) a major penalty, or (c) a match penalty against the scoring team.

When a regular-season game is tied at the end of regulation, it goes into a three-on-three, five-minute overtime period after a one-minute rest period with teams reversing the attacking direction. If a goal is scored during this period, the game ends and the team that scored the goal wins the game. If there is no scoring in the five-minute overtime, the game goes into a three-round shootout with the home team given the choice of shooting or defending first. This sequence ends when one team mathematically has more shootout goals than the other, thus winning the game. If neither team emerges victorious, the shootout continues one frame at a time until one team scores and the other does not, in which case the team that scores is given the win. A team that loses a game in overtime or the shootout receives one point in the standings; the awarding of game points to losing teams is a point of debate among fans and the media.

== Offside ==
In ice hockey, play is said to be offside if a player on the attacking team crosses the offensive blue line and into the offensive zone before the puck (unless the defensive team brings the puck into their own zone). A violation occurs when an offside player touches the puck. If a player crosses the line ahead of the puck but his team is not in possession of it, the linesman will raise his arm to signal a delayed offside; when all players from the offside team leave their offensive zone ("tag up" in the neutral zone) the linesman washes out the delayed call. When an offside violation occurs, the linesman blows the play dead, and a faceoff is conducted in the neutral zone. During the 2004–05 lockout, the league removed the "two-line offside pass" rule, which required a stoppage in play if a pass originating from inside a team's defending zone was completed on the offensive side of the center line, unless the puck crossed the line before the player. The removal of the two-line offside was one of several rule changes intended to increase overall scoring, which had been in decline since the early 1990s. The only time a player may precede the puck into the attacking zone with the puck behind in the neutral zone is if none of his teammates are in the attacking zone and the player with the puck has control of the puck in the estimation of the linesman (e.g. short-sticking/spin-o-rama).

== Icing ==
Icing occurs when a player shoots the puck across both the center line and the opposing team's goal line without the puck going through the goal crease. When icing occurs, a linesman stops play if a defending player (other than the goaltender) crosses the imaginary line that connects the two faceoff dots in their defensive zone before an attacking player is able to. If the attacking player beats the defender for the puck, the icing is waved off. Play is resumed with a faceoff in the defending zone of the team that committed the infraction. Icing is not enforced for a team that is short-handed. If the goaltender makes a move from his net to play the puck, the icing is immediately waved off (in contrast to minor league and international hockey, where the goaltender must play the puck for it to be waved off). Icing can also be waved off if, in the officials' opinion, the defending team had a viable opportunity to play the puck before crossing the goal line. After an icing, a TV timeout cannot be called. The team who iced the puck may not make any line changes before the following faceoff, however injured players can make changes with exceptions.

== Face-offs ==
Face-offs are used to start play at the beginning of each period and after all stoppages of play. At all levels of play, the teams line up in opposition to one another, and one player from each team (normally the centre) face each other at a designated point on the ice. Once a game official drops the puck between the two opposing skaters' sticks, they attempt to gain control of it.

The face-off procedure differs slightly between NHL and international rules. Prior to the 2015–16 NHL season, the away team's centre was required to place his stick on the ice first. Since that season, this is true only for face-offs on the centre-line dot; for face-offs in either attacking zone, the defending centre must place his stick first. Under international rules, the attacking centre must place his stick first for all face-offs.

== Eligibility ==
The Trushinski bylaw says players who are blind in one or both eyes are ineligible to play. The rule is named for Frank Trushinski, a minor league hockey player for the Kitchener Greenshirts. Trushinski lost his sight in one eye in a game in 1921, but was allowed to continue playing. In a later game, he suffered a skull fracture which cost him most of the sight in his other eye.

== Helmets ==
In August 1979, John Ziegler Jr., the president of the National Hockey League, announced that protective helmets would become mandatory in the NHL. "The introduction of the helmet rule will be an additional safety factor", he said. The only exception to the rule are players—after signing a waiver form—who signed pro contracts prior to June 1, 1979. Essentially, this grandfather clause allowed hockey's veterans to choose whether or not they wanted to wear helmets but forced all new players to wear them.

In 2013, visors in helmets became mandatory for players with 25 or less games of NHL experience. However, players who wore helmets without visors prior to the rule change may continue to wear them.

Beginning the 2019–20 NHL season, a player on the ice whose helmet comes off must either pick it up and put it on properly, or skate to the bench (with a reasonable opportunity to complete his immediate play). Otherwise, a minor penalty shall be assessed. Intentionally removing an opponent's helmet during play became a roughing offense punishable with a minor penalty.

== Penalties ==
A penalty is a punishment for infractions of the rules. A referee makes most penalty calls while the linesmen may call only obvious technical infractions such as too many men on the ice. In the NHL, the linesmen may also stop play due to player injury, and may report to the referees, during any stoppage in play, any circumstances pertaining to major, match, or misconduct penalties, abuse of officials (physical or otherwise), unsportsmanlike conduct, or double-minor penalties for high-sticking causing injury, that were not detected by the referees.

During a penalty, the player who committed the infraction is sent to the penalty box. When a goaltender is penalized, a player who was on the ice at the time of the infraction goes to the penalty box, and the goalie stays in game. Small infractions are deemed minor penalties, and the player is kept off the ice for two minutes of gameplay. A larger infraction, such as high-sticking that causes a visible physical injury, is deemed a double-minor, and the perpetrator is kept off the ice for four minutes. More dangerous infractions, such as fighting, are deemed major penalties and have a duration of five minutes. The penalized team cannot replace the player on the ice and is thus short-handed for the duration of the penalty. Normally, hockey teams have five skaters (plus the goaltender) on the ice. If a minor or major penalty is called, play becomes "five-on-four"—five skaters versus four skaters. This situation is called a power play for the non-penalized team and a penalty kill for the penalized team; a team is far more likely to score on a power play than during normal play. If the penalized team is scored on during a minor penalty, the penalty immediately terminates. A double-minor is divided into two separate two-minute minor penalties that are served consecutively. This means that if a goal is scored by the team on the power play before the first minor is over (before the two-minute mark of the power play), the first minor ends and the penalty clock goes down to two minutes. If a goal is scored during the second minor (after the two-minute mark of the power play), the penalty ends. Unlike minor penalties, major penalties must be served to their full completion, regardless of number of goals scored during the power play.

When a penalty is about to be called, an official raises his arm to signal a delayed penalty; play continues until the offending team touches the puck, at which point, the official blows the play dead and assesses the penalty. After a penalty is assessed, play resumes with a face-off in the offending team's defensive zone under most circumstances. If a delayed penalty is called and goes to the end of the period then the full penalty goes to the next period. If a penalty is called with less than two minutes to go in a period, except for overtime, a penalty is "carried over" into the next period, meaning that any power plays called in the final two minutes of a period move along to the next period. For example, a penalty called at 19:01 in the first period, the remaining 1:01 of the power play goes to the second period.

When a goal is scored while a delayed penalty is in effect against a team already short-handed because of a minor penalty, the new penalty is called when the goal is scored, and the scoring team is awarded a fresh power play. Furthermore, when goals are scored, penalties come off the board in the order in which they were called.

=== Own-goal mishaps ===
The offending team cannot touch the puck during a delayed penalty. This usually results in the opposing team replacing their goalie with an extra forward until the offending team touches the puck, since the offending team must touch the puck in order to score on the empty net. On rare occasions, however, this situation has resulted in an own goal. For example:

- In the November 24, 2008 New York Islanders–Montreal Canadiens game, when the referee was about to call a penalty against New York, Montreal Canadiens' goaltender Carey Price headed back to the bench for an extra forward. At that moment, Canadiens' defenceman Ryan O'Byrne, not noticing the delayed penalty and the empty net, attempted to pass the puck to his (now-missing) goaltender. The puck landed in the net and a goal was awarded to the Islanders' Bill Guerin.
- In the March 21, 2009 game between the Vancouver Canucks and the Phoenix Coyotes, Phoenix scored an empty-net goal during a delayed penalty against the Coyotes' Viktor Tikhonov. In an attempt to take possession and thus stop play, Tikhonov poke-checked Vancouver's Henrik Sedin near the Vancouver blue line. Since Tikhonov only ever touched Sedin's stick, and not the puck, play continued, even though the puck was now headed straight for Vancouver's goal. Sedin's teammate Shane O'Brien skated after the errant puck, but to no avail. Both the puck and O'Brien landed in the net (with O'Brien dislodging the net in full force), and Tikhonov was credited with the goal.
- In the March 21, 2013, game between the New Jersey Devils and the Carolina Hurricanes, when the referee was about to call a 2:00 minor penalty against the Devils' Marek Židlický for hooking, Carolina goaltender Dan Ellis was heading to the bench for an extra attacker when he discovered that Jordan Staal's pass to Tim Gleason had been unsuccessful and, as a result, the puck had bounced off the boards toward the empty net. Ellis tried to chase after it, but he could not get there in time, and, because Carolina's Alexander Semin was already in the penalty box when the puck went into the net, a power play goal was awarded to the Devils; its goaltender, Martin Brodeur — the last Devil to touch the puck — was credited with the goal.

=== Non-power play situations ===
There are exceptions to the rule where a team cannot replace a player on the ice after a penalty: mutual majors for fighting, where there are two participants in a fight, will result in each person receiving five minutes, but the penalties will not affect the on-ice strength of either team (play remains five-on-five), unless a player is deemed to be the instigator of the fight, in which case that player will receive an additional two-minute minor. There are also "coincidental" minors in which the penalties called against both teams are simultaneous and equal in length, so that neither team receives a power play, with teams skating five-on-five.

=== "Delay of game" situations ===
After the 2004–05 NHL lockout, a new rule was instituted that imposes a minor delay-of-game penalty on any defensive player who directs the puck out of bounds (e.g., over the glass into the stands or into the safety netting). When the puck is shot into either of the players’ benches, the penalty will not apply.

=== Match penalties ===
Although very uncommon, a match penalty can be assessed when a player has made a deliberate effort (successful or not) to injure an opposing player. A player who receives a match penalty is ejected for the balance of the game. Additionally, the team plays shorthanded for five minutes, regardless of the number of goals scored. Should a goaltender receive a match penalty, a backup goaltender is allowed into the game.

=== Misconduct penalties ===
There are also misconduct penalties which are reserved for infractions such as continued disputing of a call with an official.

A normal misconduct penalty results in the player being kept off the ice for 10 minutes; that player, even after the 10 minutes have expired, must remain in the penalty box until the next stoppage of play. Game misconduct penalties share the same effect as a match penalty; a player that receives a game misconduct is then immediately removed from the ice for the balance of the game. In both instances, a team will be required to replace that removed player with a substitute. If a goaltender, at any time, receive a normal misconduct, that goaltender stays in the game, and a designated skater will have to serve the misconduct penalty on the goaltender's behalf. Should a goaltender, however, receive a game misconduct, it is pulled from the game, and a backup is then put in.

A player receiving a misconduct penalty does not cause his team to play short-handed unless he also receives a minor or major penalty in addition to the misconduct penalty.

=== Power play combinations ===
Various combinations of penalties may also result in matchups such as 5-on-3, 4-on-3, 4-on-4 or even 3-on-3; in a four-on-four or three-on-three penalty combination, icing will still be enforced. A team, however, may not have fewer than four players (including the goaltender) on the ice at any point in the game.

=== Power play in overtime ===
If a penalty is called on a team in overtime, the matchups in that period cannot become 3-on-2, as there cannot be less than three skaters on the ice for a team. Instead, the power play team gets a 4-on-3 power play. When that power play ends, the matchups temporarily become 4-on-4 until the play is blown dead, after which the matchups return to 3-on-3.

== Team roster ==
The maximum number of players on an NHL roster is 23. A team can have a maximum of 50 signed players and a total of 90 players (unsigned and signed). This is typically allocated in 4 lines of three forwards, 3 defensive pairs, a starting goaltender, and a backup goaltender.

== Potential rule changes ==
In August 2010, the NHL held an "R & D camp" at the Toronto Maple Leafs’ practice facility, where rule changes under consideration were given trial runs. Scrimmages at the camp, featuring some top players eligible for the 2011 NHL entry draft, experimented with changes such as two-on-two overtime, shallower goal nets, a referee viewing the play from an elevated off-ice platform, and a rink with three face-off circles instead of the traditional five.

== Table of comparison ==
In 2021 IIHF adopted a new rule book which is based on NHL rules, however, some differences remain. The following table lists some of the key differences between NHL and IIHF rules.

Rule or Term	NHL	IIHF
Rink dimensions	200 feet (60.96 m) by 85 feet (25.91 m)	60 metres (196.9 ft) by 25–30 metres (82.0–98.4 ft)
Goal line (from end boards)	11 feet (3.4 m)	4 metres (13 ft)
Blue lines (from end boards)	75 feet (23 m)	22.5 metres (73.8 ft)
Helmets	Player must leave the ice if their helmet comes off during play, unless they retrieve their helmet. Only players with less than 25 games in NHL are required to wear a visor.	Player must leave the ice if their helmet comes off during play and is not allowed to retrieve it. All players must wear at least a visor for facial protection.
Goaltender interference	Play is not stopped if an attacking player stands in the goal crease, but it may be considered goaltender interference and goal disallowed	Referee may stop the play if an attacking player stands in the goal crease and does not leave immediately
Major penalty	Game misconduct penalty is assessed when a player receives third major penalty in the same game, and a substitute player must be placed in the penalty box before the penalty expires	Game misconduct penalty is assessed when a player receives second major penalty in the same game, and a substitute player must be placed in the penalty box immediately
Penalty shot	Fouled player must take the shot, unless injured or ejected from the game	Any player may take the shot
Fighting	Major penalty	Match penalty
Shootout	Three shots, followed by sudden death if still tied. No player may shoot twice until all other eligible players have shot	Five shots, followed by sudden death if still tied. Same player can be used for each shot after the first five shots
Postseason overtime	Consecutive 20 minute periods of 5-on-5 overtime until a goal is scored	One 10 minute period of 3-on-3 overtime followed by a shootout, except finals which have consecutive 20 minute periods until a goal is scored
Face-off procedure	Player taking the face-off is replaced after a face-off violation, except after icing	Player taking the face-off is warned but not replaced after a face-off violation
