= Andrzej Tkacz =

Polish ice hockey player (born 1946)

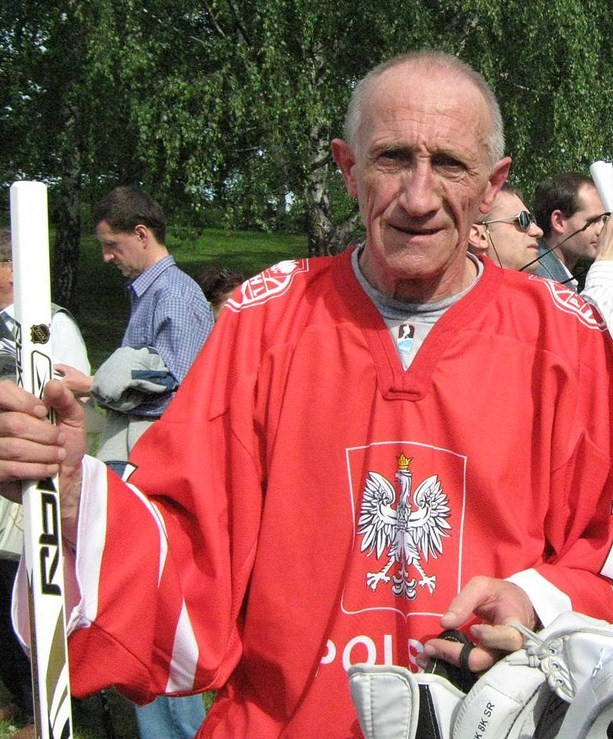
- Born: 20 September 1946 (age 79) Katowice, Poland
- Height: 5 ft 9 in (175 cm)
- Weight: 148 lb (67 kg; 10 st 8 lb)
- Position: Goaltender
- Played for: GKS Katowice; ZSC Lions
- National team: Poland
- NHL draft: Undrafted
- Playing career: 1965–1982

Andrzej Józef Tkacz (born 20 September 1946) is a former Polish ice hockey goaltender. He played for the Poland men's national ice hockey team at the 1972 Winter Olympics in Sapporo, and the 1976 Winter Olympics in Innsbruck.
