= Sports strategy =

Strategy in sports

A rugby union formation.

Sports strategy refers to the numerous sets of methods applied in various sports in order to find ways and create advantageous methods for achieving an outcome of success. For team sports, strategy largely consists of how to coordinate the internal movements and positioning of players in a team. For individual sports, strategy is based on advantages that can be found in various available options for the player.

Each sport often has its own strategies refined for the accomplishments of a specific outcome within that sport. There exists however some observable cross-sports applicability across certain sports as a result of similarities within rules and conditions for said sports. One example is the denotation between man-to-man defense and zone defense respectively, which is used across many team sports.

== Analytics ==
With the development of various technological tools for aiding in sports analytics, a considerable amount of popular sports have adopted the widespread use of analytical models to aid in forming and developing strategic models and tools for reflection over the strategic parts of the game. Data analysis is a frequently integrated discipline into sports management practices not only in the development of in-game strategy but also practice strategies and routines for recovery management.

Baseball was one of the pioneering sports in the use of analytics of in-game statistics through its development of sabermetrics in the mid-20th century. Association football has long been known for using possession stats to track the time (as presented in percentages) each team is in control of the ball, and has in the 21st century integrated expected goals models into its statistical portfolio. Although opinions has been fragmented as to the potential relevance to the strategic side of sports, the introduction of analytics have marked a revolutionary shift in how sports strategy is perceived and developed.

== American football ==
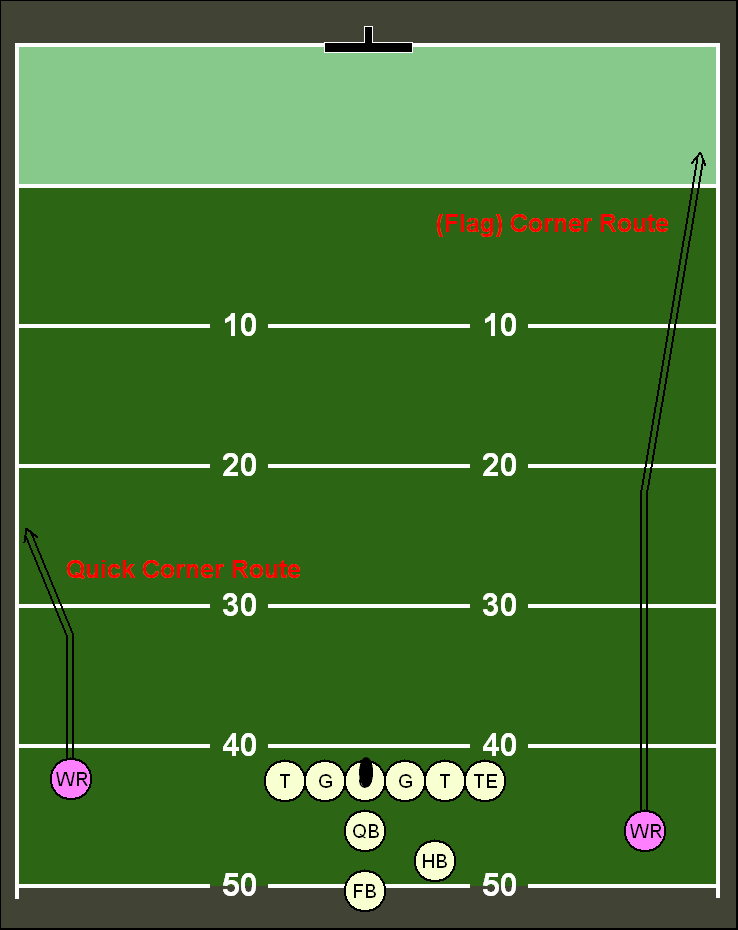
Corner routes for receivers in American football.

Strategy forms a major part of American football. Teams plan many aspects of their plays (offense) and response to plays (defense), such as what formations they take, who they put on the field, and the roles and instructions each player are given. American football uses several play calling systems in order to arrange for strategies to be carried out on the field in real-time.

=== Offense ===
On offense, there are three types of players: linemen, backs, and receivers. These players' positions and duties on the field vary from one offensive scheme to another.

Before the ball is snapped the offensive team lines up in a formation. When the team is in formation and the quarterback gives a signal, either by calling out instructions or giving a non-verbal cue (a so-called "silent count"), the center snaps the ball to the quarterback and a play begins. An offensive play is considered a passing play if the ball is passed by the quarterback to an eligible receiver, and a running play if not.

=== Defense ===
On defense, there are three types of players: linemen, linebackers, and defensive backs (also called secondary players). These players' specific positions on the field and duties during the game vary depending on the type of defense being used as well as the kind of offense the defense is facing. Akin to the offensive team, the defensive team also lines up in a formation prior to the play.

Defensive plays can generally be categorized into three main categories – run defense, pass defense and blitz. The run defense is designed to defend against offensive running plays. The pass defense is designed to defend against offensive passing plays. The blitz is a play where defenses send extra players to rush the line of scrimmage in order to try to get to the quarterback in quick fashion, giving the offense less time to make a run or pass.

=== Special teams ===
There are also special strategies and personnel formations for what is called special teams in football, which is basically kicking plays. When field goals or punts are performed, a number of specific strategies are in use so as to secure the successful attempt. Additionally, fakes may be used where the (supposed) kicking team may instead choose to play the ball like a normal play – this at the risk of handing over possession to the opponent, possibly in advanced areas of the field.

Upon having scored a touchdown, a team may opt for a two-point conversion over the close range field goal which grants only one extra point.

== Association football ==
4–5–1 formation in association football.

In association football, a considerable part of strategy goes out to picking a formation ahead of a game as well as selecting the players to start the game, as the rules for a competitive game allows only for a select number of substitutions during the course of the game. The formation acts as a guideline for positioning as well as role responsibilities for each player on the pitch. Formations indicate how the 10 outfielders are arranged positionally in relation to each other, and may be altered freely during the course of a game.

Modern association football formations typically consist three to five defenders, two to five midfielders, and one to three forwards. The choice of formation is normally made by a team's manager or head coach. Other duties of strategy in association football include selecting the captain for a game, bringing on in-game substitutes and defining roles for the taking of set pieces – corners, free kicks, and penalty kicks.

== Ice hockey ==
Although the exact number of players dressed for an ice hockey game varies from competition to competition and between tournaments, an ice hockey lineup is typically presented as 2 goaltenders and 18 skaters, plus one or more additional skaters as allowed by the rules in effect. The 18 skaters are usually consistent of 12 forwards and 6 defencemen, although this is not a requirement.

A starting lineup typically consists of a starting goaltender, a left defenceman, a right defenceman, a left winger, a centre and a right winger. Thus in a roster of 18 skaters this amounts to 4 forward lines and 3 defensive pairings. In the course of the game, frequent shifts between skaters on the ice are made, as navigated by the coaches of a team. A team in need of scoring a goal with little time marginal may opt to pull the goaltender and instead play with six skaters, this strategy however comes with the disadvantage of a high risk of conceding a goal in the other end.

Normally when in a coverage situation, a defensive side accounts for the offensive players by order of distance to the goal line of the defensive zone, though individual variations occur between different teams as well as different in-game situations. This is referred to as "zoning out" the opposing side.

A team that employs a more progressive style of defense may opt for a high forecheck, which is a term for applying pressure on the offensive half of the ice when in defense. Such a team may conversely have to engage in backchecking, as a means of transitioning back to defense in the neutral zone should the forecheck not result in a regaining of the puck. More defensively conservative teams may favour a trapping style of play where the need for forechecking and backchecking is not as prevalent.

Special teams in ice hockey refer to situations where one team has a numerical advantage on the ice for a period of play, as a result of one or more penalties being drawn on the ice. Strategies exist specifically for power play and penalty kill situations.

== See also ==
- Chess strategy
- Coach (sport)
- Defense (sports)
- Offense (sports)
- Sports governing body
