= 200-foot game =

Ice hockey player's ability to play end-to-end hockey

A 200-foot game is a definition in ice hockey that describes a player's (usually a forward's) ability to have strong presence in all three zones of an ice rink, which is standardized at 200 feet long. Players who can play a 200-foot game are contrasted with players who score a lot of points by avoiding hard forechecking or backchecking, cherry picking their plays perhaps for breakaways, and avoiding fighting for the puck in the corners of the rink, such as Pavel Bure or Brett Hull. Playing a 200-foot game means fighting for each part of the ice, fighting for control of the puck whether it's in one's possession or not, and engaging using your body in traffic. Classic examples of players who exemplify the 200-foot player include Gordie Howe, Bryan Trottier, Jari Kurri, Steve Yzerman, Patrice Bergeron, Doug Gilmour, Pavel Datsyuk, Mike Modano, Bobby Clarke, Sergei Fedorov, Joe Sakic, Anže Kopitar, Bob Gainey, Frank Nighbor, Ryan Getzlaf and Sidney Crosby.

Having players able to play a 200-foot game is widely considered a key to success in the modern game. The term can also be used to refer to defencemen who are also skilled offensive players (such as Bobby Orr and Nicklas Lidström), as well as coaches that employ a balanced style of play.
