= Winger (ice hockey) =

Ice hockey position

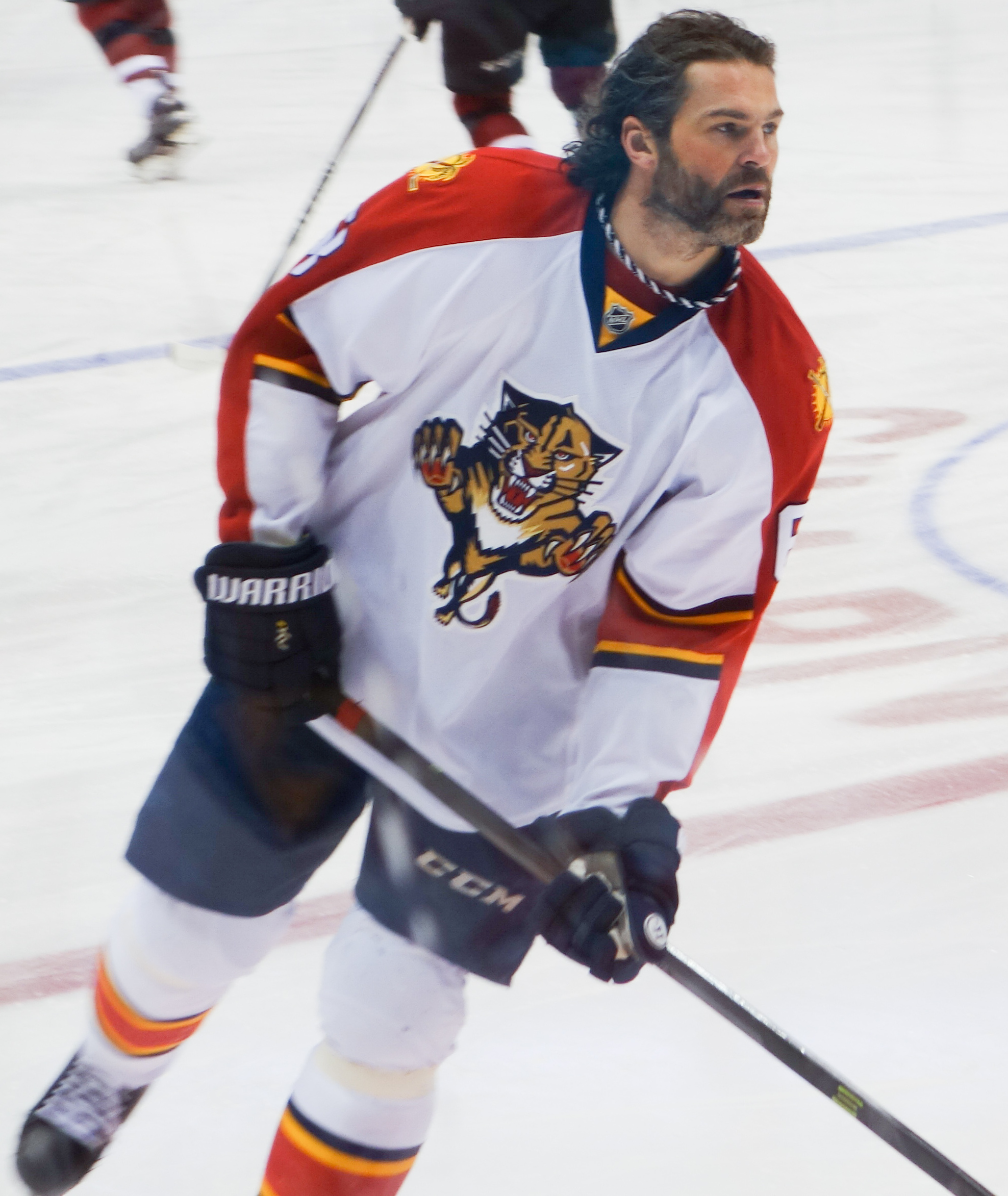
Jaromir Jagr is the third-highest-scoring winger in NHL history, following Alex Ovechkin and Gordie Howe, and is second overall to centre Wayne Gretzky in total points.

Winger, in the game of ice hockey, is a forward position of a player whose primary zone of play is along the outer playing areas. They typically flank the centre forward. Originally, the name was given to forward players who went up and down the sides of the rink. Wingers generally have the least defensive responsibilities out of any position on the ice, however they are still tasked with defensive duties such as forechecking duties or covering the point in the defensive zone.

Nowadays, there are different types of wingers in the game — out-and-out goal scorers, checkers who disrupt the opponents, and forwards who work along the boards and in the corners. Often a winger's precise role on a line depends upon what type of role the other winger plays; usually lines will have one more goal-scoring oriented winger and one winger more focused on playing the boards, checking and passing the puck to others to take shots (if a larger player, he will sometimes be called a "power forward").

This position is commonly referred to by the side of the rink that the winger normally takes, i.e. "left wing" or "right wing." The side of the rink the player played on traditionally related to the side of their body they take a shot from (i.e. left-shooting playing left wing) but in recent decades more wingers have played the "off wing" meaning the opposite side of the direction they shoot, which enables faster release shots if receiving a pass while standing stationary in the offensive zone.

== Offensive zone play ==
The wingers' responsibilities in the offensive zone include the following:

- finding open space for a pass from their teammates
- intercepting a pass to the opposing defenceman
- attacking the opposing defencemen when they have the puck

== Defensive zone play ==
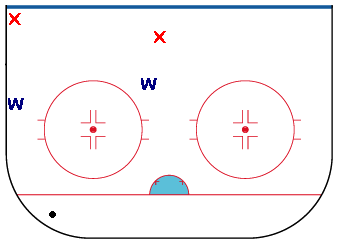
Typical winger positioning in the defensive zone

Wingers often will be playing high in the zone (close to the blue line), typically covering the defensemen of the opposing team, meaning they block passes from going to the defencemen and block shots from the defenceman. Wingers should always be vigilant for a breakout pass or a chance to chip the puck past the defenceman of the opposing team across the blue line. When wingers receive a pass along the boards, they can exercise a number of options:

- Bank the puck off the boards or glass to get it out of the zone
- Redirect or softly pass the puck to a teammate advancing into the neutral zone who can then choose to set up an attack, or dump the puck into the offensive zone to allow either a line change or for teammates to further attack the defenders
- Carry the puck themselves into the offensive zone to attempt a breakaway or an odd-man rush, where the attacking team advances with more players close to the puck than there are defenders

Wingers should typically not:

- play deep in their defensive zone
- help out their teammates along the boards

== Backchecking ==
Wingers are typically the last players to backcheck out of the offensive zone. On the backcheck, it is essential that they cover the last free opposing player rushing in. Once the puck is controlled by the opposing team in the defensive zone, however, wingers are responsible for covering the defenceman on their side of the ice.

== Face-offs ==
Prior to the puck being dropped for a face-off, players other than those taking the face-off must not make any physical contact with players on the opposite team, nor enter the face-off circle (where marked). After the puck is dropped, it is essential for wingers to engage the opposing players to prevent them from obtaining possession of the puck.

Once a team has established control of the puck, wingers can set themselves up into an appropriate position.

Some wingers are also employed to handle faceoffs.
