= Forward (ice hockey) =

Ice hockey position

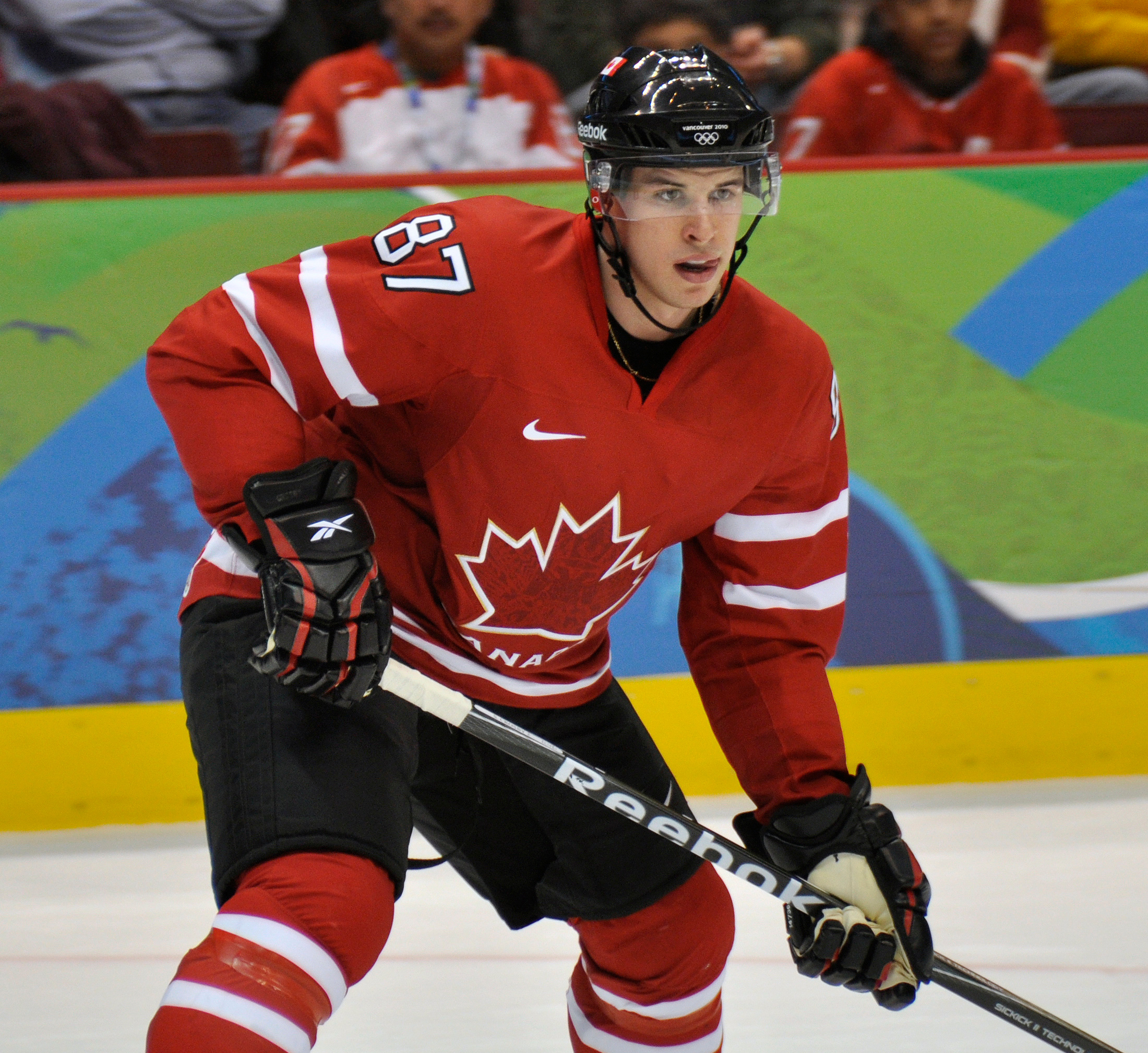
Sidney Crosby, widely regarded one of the greatest hockey players of all time, has played his entire career as a forward.

In ice hockey, a forward is a player position focused primarily on generating offense by scoring goals and assisting teammates. Each team uses three forwards per line—two wingers (left wing and right wing) and one centre. The centre often leads attacks and takes face-offs, while the wingers support play along the boards and look for scoring chances.

== Responsibilities ==
Offensively, forwards typically spread out across three lanes on the ice, allowing for effective spacing and coordination. One common tactic is the triangle strategy, where the puck is passed between the forwards to force the goaltender to move laterally, creating openings for shots. Forwards also cycle the puck back to defenceman at the blue line, opening up chances for shots from the point or restarting offensive plays to maintain pressure in the offensive zone.

Defensively, forwards play a crucial supporting role alongside the defencemen, especially in the neutral and defensive zones. They are expected to backcheck aggressively, apply pressure on the opposition during transitions, and help disrupt offensive plays. In the defensive zone, forwards assist in covering opponents, blocking passing lanes, and supporting the defense near the net. Centres often take on added responsibility, helping to guard the slot and clear rebounds.

Forwards who excel at both ends of the ice, known as two-way forwards, are highly valued for their ability to transition quickly between defence and offence and contribute in key moments like penalty kills or protecting a lead.
