= Offense (sports) =

Action of attacking opposing team

In sports, offense (American spelling) or offence (Commonwealth spelling, see spelling differences; and pronounced with first-syllable stress; from Latin offensus), known as attack outside of North America, is the action of attacking or engaging an opposing team with the objective of scoring points or goals. The term may refer to the tactics involved in offense or a sub-team whose primary responsibility is offense.

Generally, goals are scored by teams' offenses, but in sports such as American football it is common to see defenses and special teams (which serve as a team's offensive unit on kicking plays and defensive on returning plays) score as well. The fielding side in cricket is also generally known as the bowling attack despite the batting side being the side that scores runs, because they can prevent batting players from scoring by getting them out, and end the batting team's scoring turn by getting them all out.

In countries outside North America, the term offence is almost always taken to mean an infraction of the rules, a penalty or foul, and attack is more likely to be used where Americans would use offense.

Many sports involve elements of offense and defense, where teams take turns trying to score points while also trying to prevent the opposing team from scoring. Sports that use an offense and defense:

- American football
- Football (soccer)
- Basketball
- Hockey
- Baseball

== Baseball ==
=== How the offense works ===
Baseball's offense revolves around the team trying to get on base and score runs against the opposing team. Each team has nine chances to score runs, with a total of once per inning.

=== Batting order ===
- The offensive side of baseball follows an order in which the players will take turns “at-bat” or when they face the opposing team’s pitcher. The batting order is a total of nine players long, and the order in which the players are aligned varies from team to team based on skill and strategy.

=== At bat ===
- When a player from the batting team steps up to the plate, they face a crucial challenge from the pitcher from the opposing team. The pitcher, a key defensive player, throws the ball toward home plate, aiming to get it past the batter and into the catcher's mitt. The batter's goal is to hit the ball into fair territory, away from the defenders. The batter can get on base by getting a hit or walking.

=== Hits and walks ===
During an at-bat, the batter attempts to reach base by contacting the baseball with the baseball bat and putting it in fair territory without the defense making a play to get them out. Hits are classified in four separate ways:

- Single – When a batter hits the ball into fair territory and reaches first base safely.
- Double – When a batter safely hits the ball into fair territory and reaches second base.
- Triple - When a batter hits the ball into fair territory and reaches third base safely.
- Home run – When a batter hits the ball into fair territory and it either goes over the fence without touching the ground, the batter is awarded all four bases and scores a run. An inside-the-park home run occurs when a player hits the ball into fair territory and reaches home plate safely after touching all other bags.
- Walk – A walk occurs when an at-bat ends if the pitcher throws four “balls” before throwing three “strikes” or the batter puts the ball in play.

=== Base-running ===
Once a batter reaches base, they become a baserunner. Baserunners can advance to the next base on subsequent hits, walks (when the pitcher throws four balls outside the strike zone), or when they steal a base (attempt to advance while the pitcher is delivering the ball). Baserunners must touch each base in order, and they can be tagged out by defenders with the ball.

=== Scoring runs ===
The batting team's objective is to score runs. A run is scored when a baserunner successfully advances around all four bases and touches home plate before the defensive team can record three outs.

=== Outs ===
The batting team has three outs per inning to try to score runs. An out can occur in various ways, including striking out (when the batter fails to hit the ball after three strikes), getting caught by a fielder, or by force outs (when a fielder with possession of the ball reaches a base before the baserunner).

=== Strategy ===
Offense in baseball also involves strategic decisions by the batters and coaches. This includes bunting (purposefully tapping the ball lightly to advance baserunners), stealing bases, hitting for power, and executing hit-and-run plays.

=== Notable offenses ===
- 1927 New York Yankees
- 1975 Cincinnati Reds
- 2001 Seattle Mariners

== American football ==
In football, the offense is the team with the ball and trying to score points. At the start of the game, the offense gets the ball first. The main goal of the offense is to move the ball down the field toward the opponent's end zone. This is done by running with the ball or throwing it to the offensive teammates. The offense has four chances (called downs) to move the ball at least 10 yards. If the offense succeed, they get another set of downs. If the offense does not, the other team will get the ball. The offense uses different strategies and plays to outsmart the defense and move the ball efficiently and effectively. The coaches design these plays and involve players running specific routes, blocking opponents, and making quick decisions with the ball.

=== Scoring ===
The ultimate aim of the offense is to score points. They can do this by carrying the ball into the opponent's end zone for a touchdown (worth 6 points) or by kicking the ball through the opponent's goalposts for a field goal (worth 3 points). If they score a touchdown, they can also score an extra point by kicking the ball through the goalposts (1 point) or running or passing the ball into the end zone (2-point conversions).

The offense's job is to advance the ball down the field and score points while avoiding turnovers and getting stopped by the defense.

=== Offensive positions ===
- Quarterback (QB): Leader of the offense. They call plays, receive the snap, and pass the ball to a teammate or hand it off to the running backs.
- Running back (RB): Lines up behind or beside the quarterback and primarily carries the ball. They can also be used as receivers in passing plays or blockers to protect the quarterback.
- Wide receiver (WR): Lines up on the outside edges of the offensive formation. Their primary role is to catch passes from the quarterback and advance the ball down the field. They must be fast, agile, and skilled at catching the ball in traffic.
- Tight end (TE): Versatile players who line up on the offensive line next to the tackles but can also split out wide like a wide receiver. They are often used as blockers in running plays or pass protectors in passing plays. Additionally, tight ends can catch passes and are a valuable receiving option for the quarterback.
- Offensive line (OL): Consists of five players: the center, two guards, and two tackles. Their primary job is to protect the quarterback from the defense's pass rush and create openings for the running backs by blocking defensive players. The center starts each play by snapping the ball to the quarterback.

=== Notable offenses ===
- 1994 San Francisco 49ers
- 1981 San Diego Chargers
- 2007 New England Patriots

== See also ==
- Defence (sports)
- Goalkeeper
- Sports strategy
