= Vladimír Mirka =

Czech former football coach (born 1928)

Personal information
- Date of birth: 14 December 1928 (age 97)
- Place of birth: Czechoslovakia

Managerial career
- Years: Team
- 1965–1967: Cambodia
- 1967–1971: Czechoslovakia U18
- 1972–1973: Espérance Sportive de Tunis
- 1975: Czechoslovakia U23
- 1979–1981: FK Teplice
- 1983–1984: VTZ Chomutov
- 1986–1987: Sparta Prague (youth)

Vladimir Mirka (born 14 December 1928, in Czechoslovakia) is a Czech former football coach. His best achievement as coach was guiding the Czechoslovakia Under-18s to European glory in 1968 using the 4-2-4 formation.

== Career ==
The second coach of the Cambodia national team since its existence, (the first being Mr. Colman who headed the team from 1960 to 1963) he managed the team from 1965 to 1967 including a friendly with Australia in which they tied 0-0. Soon, in 1967, Mirka took the reins of the Czechoslovakia Under-18s and became coach of Tunisian title contenders Espérance Sportive de Tunis in 1972, remaining at the club for one season only. The Czech then took charge of the Czechoslovakia Under-23s for one year before managing FK Teplice (which played in the Czech 2.Liga at the time) and VTZ Chomutov in his native Czechoslovakia. Lastly, for one season, Mirka managed the Sparta Prague youth selections. There was no information regarding him following the Velvet Revolution in 1989 which precipitated the secession of Slovakia from the Czech Republic.
