= Short-handed =

Sports term for having fewer players due to penalty

Short-handed is a term used in ice hockey and several related sports, including water polo, and refers to having fewer players on the ice during play, as a result of a penalty. The penalized team is said to be on the penalty kill, abbreviated as "PK", and the opposing team is on a power play, with an "advantage" until the penalized player returns to play.

== Impact on gameplay ==
Players assigned to power play or penalty killing duties are often known as "special teams". The team on the power play often only has one defenseman at the rear rather than the typical two, so that it can add another attacker. This strategy can be exploited by the short-handed team, if they manage to get the puck into the neutral zone, leaving most of the opposing players behind, and the penalty killers may enjoy odd man rushes and breakaways against the single defenseman of the advantaged team.

In most competitions, the short-handed team is free to ice the puck without the play being stopped, and thus can change lines at roughly the same intervals as during five-on-five play. Some governing bodies have enforced icing for teams on the penalty kill, including the World Hockey Association during the 1970s, the United States Hockey League (USHL) during its 2014 Fall Classic exhibition series, and USA Hockey for all sanctioned youth competitions (players 14 and under, in all age groups) since 2017–18.

== 5-on-3 ==
A team can have two or more players in the penalty box, but cannot ever have fewer than three skaters on the ice at any given time. If the other team is at full strength and the penalized team has two players in the penalty box, plus a goalie in net, the situation is called a five on three. This situation gives the team on the power play an even greater chance of scoring. If the advantaged team on the 5-on-3 scores, the player who took the earlier of the two penalties may return to the ice, and play resumes as a power play with only one player in the penalty box. However, if the first penalty taken was a double-minor penalty, the penalty that expires is the first penalty of the double-minor, and the clock then begins to run down on the second penalty, with the 5-on-3 continuing.

A call for too many men on the ice in a 5-on-3 situation in the last two minutes of regulation or in overtime results in a penalty shot. This current rule resulted from coach Roger Neilson's exploitation of rule loopholes during an OHL game when his team was up one goal, but was down two men in a five-on-three situation for the last minute of the game. Realizing that more penalties could not be served under the existing rules, Neilson put too many men on the ice every ten seconds. The referees stopped the play and a face-off was held, relieving pressure on the defense.

In regular-season overtime in the NHL, which is normally played 3-on-3, a 5-on-3 situation is possible if two players on one team are serving penalties at the same time.

== Short-handed goals ==
A short-handed goal is a goal scored in ice hockey when a team's on-ice players are outnumbered by the opposing team's. If the team on the power play scores a goal while the other team is short-handed, the penalty is over, except if a goal was scored during a major penalty or a match penalty in regulation time. In the Professional Women's Hockey League (PWHL) in North America, a minor penalty ends if either team scores a goal; a short-handed goal during a minor penalty is called a "jailbreak goal" in the PWHL for this reason.

When one team pulls its goaltender near the end of a game to play with an extra attacker, any goal scored on the empty net is not considered to be short-handed, because there are equal numbers of players on ice for the teams.

Short-handed goals are somewhat infrequent when a team is down one player, and some instances have occurred where two short-handed goals have been scored on the same penalty. Very rarely is a short-handed goal scored by a team that is down two players (the general approach when down two men is for the opposing team to assume the "iron cross:" establish a diamond shape with one forward, two defensemen and the goaltender, remain in the defensive zone, and clear the puck whenever possible, without making any effort to make an offensive play and jeopardize the already weakened defensive position). Former Philadelphia Flyers captain Mike Richards holds the record for most career 3-on-5 goals with three, having attained the last one during the 2008–09 season. The quickest trio of short-handed goals ever scored in a National Hockey League (NHL) game occurred on April 10, 2010, during a game at the TD Garden between the Boston Bruins and Carolina Hurricanes, when the Bruins scored three short-handed goals against Carolina's goaltender Cam Ward in only 1:04 of game time, during a minor hooking penalty to Bruins defenseman Matt Hunwick. The Boston Bruins also made NHL history for those short-handed goals, as it was the first time that a team scored three times on a single penalty kill (Daniel Paille, Blake Wheeler, Steve Bégin). The most short-handed goals ever scored in one NHL game by one team occurred on April 7, 1995, when the Winnipeg Jets scored four, the most since the end of the era of the Original Six teams of the NHL.

== See also ==
- Power play
- Sports strategy
