= Neutral zone trap =

Ice hockey play

In this diagram, the red team is executing a neutral zone trap resulting in the blue team dumping the puck in.

The neutral zone trap (often referred to as simply the trap) is a defensive strategy used in ice hockey to prevent an opposing team from proceeding through the neutral zone (the area between the blue lines) and to force turnovers.

== Description ==
The most recognizable implementation of the trap sees the defense stationing four of their players in the neutral zone and one forechecker in the offensive zone. As the offensive team starts to move up the ice, the forechecker (generally the center) will cut off passing lanes to other offensive players by staying in the middle of the ice, forcing the puck carrier to either sideboard. The defensive wingers—typically placed on or near the red line—will be positioned by the boards to challenge the puck carrier, prevent passing, or even keep opponents from moving through. The two defencemen who are positioned on or near the blue lines are the last defence, and must stall the opposition long enough for the wingers to reset themselves and continue the trap.

== History ==
The modern neutral zone trap is best associated in the National Hockey League with the New Jersey Devils, starting in the mid-1990s. The strategy was controversial, where it was criticized for contributing to low scoring and unexciting games. ESPN analyst Mike Milbury said it should be banned.

During the 2004–05 NHL lockout, serious discussion about opening the game to offense was held between the NHL and NHL Players Association (NHLPA). Because it is easier to trap when engaging in obstruction and restraining fouls, such as hooking and holding, which slow the progress of faster players who can evade the trapping team, the NHL ordered officials to call every obstruction penalty, regardless of circumstance. The prohibition on two-line passes from behind a team's blue line to the other side of the red line was also lifted. Long passes are one method for breaking out of the trap, as it avoids the need to navigate through defenders in the neutral zone, although it has high rates of turnovers.

The NHL also implemented a “Goalkeeper’s Restricted Area” ("Martin Brodeur Rule"), a trapezoidal area behind the net outside of which goalies cannot play the puck if they are behind the goal line. This allows offenses to more effectively dump the puck past the trap into the corners. The rule was created to reduce the effectiveness of goaltenders that handle the puck well, such as New Jersey Devils goalie Martin Brodeur, for whom the rule is nicknamed. Defensively minded teams have reverted to a "third man high" 1–3–1 system where only two offensive players will commit down low, allowing the third to join the defense and impede progress across the blue line.
