= The point (ice hockey) =

Player's position inside the opponent's end zone

The point in ice hockey is a position inside the opposition's blue line along the edges of the rink.

== Description ==
A player in the opponent's end zone at the junction of the blue line with the boards is said to be at the point. Usually the players at the two points are the defencemen. On the power play the players playing at these positions are always known as the points, though one of the positions is sometimes played by a forward.

The point's responsibilities include attempting to keep the puck in the offensive zone when the defensive team attempts to clear (see also Offside (ice hockey)), receiving a pass from the forwards to allow the play to reset, and taking slapshots at the goal, hoping to score, create a rebound or a deflection. On the power play, one of the players playing the point is typically the "quarterback" - that is, the one who controls (through passing) where the puck goes, and also takes many shots.

Given the difficulty of scoring directly from the point due to the distance to the goal, goals scored from the point are typically either on screens, or are tipped goals.

== Point and cover point ==
In the early years of ice hockey, the two defencemen were known as the "point" and "cover-point" players. The term the point may have been derived from that early terminology. The point played further back, while the cover-point was allowed more latitude to roam forward.
