= Backcheck =

Ice hockey defensive transition play

The backcheck is an ice hockey defensive transition play made (primarily) in the neutral zone. It is a type of checking. The purpose of the backcheck is to try to limit the opponent's options as they head up the ice towards the backchecking team's end zone. The backcheck may be initiated by situations such as having lost the puck in the opponent's half of the ice, the opponents having played through the first line of pressure in their own end zone, or having lost a faceoff in the neutral zone.

In simpler words, backchecking is when a team loses possession of the puck, typically in their offensive zone, and then chases the opposing team as the opposing team skates down the ice towards the first team's defensive zone. Backchecking is typically done by the forwards on the team, as the defensemen are typically already in position and playing against the opposing team. The purpose of a backcheck is to mainly pressure the forwards of the opposing team, as well as to balance out the numerical advantage the other team may have in an odd man rush, rushes where the number of players are unbalanced, leaving the rushing team with an advantage (i.e. 3 on 2, or a rush where 3 players are trying to score against 2 defending players).

An important aspect of backchecking is counting the opponent's players. This is to make sure that the opponents are not gaining any significant numerical advantages on the ice during transition. Failure to adequately count numbers in particular in the neutral zone by the backchecking team most likely leads to numerical advantages by the opponent when, and if, entering the backchecking team's end zone.

A proper backcheck leads to significantly less time and space for the opponents during transition, and as such may cause them to turn the puck over, effectively avoiding an end zone entry altogether - if not, then the defensive team will still be well organized following a zone entry by the opponent, and thus a proper backcheck also helps in limiting scoring chances in subsequent play on the ice.

Players that are known to excel at defensive responsibilities in all areas of the ice, such as on the backcheck, are normally referred to as 200-foot players.

== See also ==
- Neutral zone trap
- Forecheck
