= Forecheck =

Strategy in ice hockey

The forecheck is an ice hockey defensive coverage play made (primarily) in the offensive zone with the objective of applying pressure to the opposing team to regain control of the puck. It is a type of checking. Forechecking is generally executed in one of three situations: recovery of the puck after a dump in, after the rebound following a scoring attempt, or immediately after a turnover to regain possession. Forechecking can be aggressive or conservative depending on the coaching style and on the skating skills of the players.

Aggressive forechecking strategies are more suited for players with good skating mobility, while more conservative plays such as the neutral zone trap are better suited for players with less agility.

== Forecheck Strategies ==
Forechecking is an essential part of the game of ice hockey, and often involves one of several strategies.

Since forechecking is meant to be an aggressive style of defensive play, it is more common to be applied in a man-to-man fashion than in a zonal style of marking, although both do exist. Zonal forechecking will typically result in a more conservative forecheck.

=== 2-1-2 Forecheck Strategy ===
On the forecheck, the 2-1-2 Strategy is more aggressive when compared to other styles. The forechecking team sends two players deep into the offensive zone in hopes of gaining possession of the puck, while a third forward lingers around the faceoff circle closest to the puck. This means that there are three defenders back on defense against just two players on offense.

=== 1-2-2 Forecheck Strategy ===
This strategy works great when the game is tied and/or there is lots of time left on the clock. The lead forechecker applies pressure to the puck carrier (opponent), while the other two forwards serve as secondary forecheck options. These two forwards are positioned on the ice so as to break up passes, grab loose pucks, and assist along the side boards. The two defensemen are passively positioned along the blue line waiting for the puck to come to them. If their teammates recover the puck or if the forecheck fails, they will take a more active role.

=== 2-3 Forecheck Strategy ===
A third common forecheck strategy is the 2-3 Strategy, which is similar to the 2-1-2 Strategy, where two players press high, but unlike the 2-1-2 version instead elects to use the third forward as what is effectively a third defenseman on the ice. Depending on the type of 2-3 system, the third forward acts either as an inner defender, allowing the defenseman on the puck side to pinch the boards, or as an outer defender, by themselves locking the weak side half boards. This tactic allows the two forechecking forwards to go really high and aggressive, though it demands a lot of the defensemen who have to be agile enough to adjust to the play.

== See also ==
- Gegenpress
- Backcheck
