= News media endorsements in the 2024 United States presidential election =

Various newspapers and magazines endorsed candidates in the 2024 United States presidential election, as follows. Tables below also show which candidate each publication endorsed in the 2020 election (where known) and include only endorsements for the general election.

Some publications which had endorsed candidates in previous presidential elections made no endorsement in 2024.

== Daily newspapers ==
=== Summary of daily newspapers ===
Candidate	Endorsements
Kamala Harris	54
Donald Trump	6
No endorsement	22

=== Endorsements ===
Newspaper	2024 endorsement	Endorsement date	City	State	2020 endorsement
The Baltimore Sun	No endorsement	January 20	Baltimore	Maryland	Joe Biden
Edwardsville Intelligencer	No endorsement	August 24	Edwardsville	Illinois	
The Seattle Times (Note: Previously endorsed Joe Biden)	Kamala Harris	September 1	Seattle	Washington	Joe Biden
Wisconsin State Journal	Kamala Harris	September 15	Madison	Wisconsin	Joe Biden
The Dominion Post	Kamala Harris	September 19	Morgantown	West Virginia	Joe Biden
The Oregonian	Kamala Harris	September 22	Portland	Oregon	Joe Biden
Minnesota Star Tribune	No endorsement	September 23	Minneapolis	Minnesota	Joe Biden
The Washington Times	Donald Trump	September 27	Washington	District of Columbia	Donald Trump
Omaha World-Herald	No endorsement	September 30	Omaha	Nebraska	Joe Biden
The New York Times	Kamala Harris	September 30	New York	New York	Joe Biden
The Palm Beach Post (Note: Previously editorialized in favor of Joe Biden's record over Trump, but did not issue an explicit command to vote for him) (Note: No newspaper owned by Gannett (the "USA Today Network") will endorse candidates for president.)	No endorsement	October 2	West Palm Beach	Florida	Joe Biden
Daily Herald	Kamala Harris	October 6	Arlington Heights	Illinois	Joe Biden
The Santa Fe New Mexican	Kamala Harris	October 12	Santa Fe	New Nexico	Joe Biden
The Day	Kamala Harris	October 12	New London	Connecticut	No endorsement
Las Vegas Review-Journal	Donald Trump	October 13	Las Vegas	Nevada	Donald Trump
Quad-City Times	No endorsement	October 14	Davenport	Iowa	Joe Biden
The Dispatch / The Rock Island Argus	No endorsement	October 14	Moline	Illinois	Joe Biden
The Denver Post (Note: No newspaper owned by affiliates of Alden Global Capital (through Digital First Media, Tribune Publishing, or Daily News Enterprises) will endorse candidates for President.)	No endorsement	October 14	Denver	Colorado	No endorsement
The Berkshire Eagle	Kamala Harris	October 16	Pittsfield	Massachusetts	Joe Biden
St. Joseph News-Press	Donald Trump	October 17	St. Joseph	Missouri	Donald Trump
Chattanooga Times Free Press (Note: The Chattanooga Times Free Press maintains separate editorial pages for its Times and Free Press components since the Times and Free Press merged in 1999. The Times endorsed Harris, and the Free Press did not endorse a candidate. In 2020, the Times endorsed Biden, and the Free Press did not endorse a candidate. The editorials were written by the paper's opinion editors, Ben Sessoms for the Times and Clint Cooper for the Free Press, as they were the only local opinion writers employed by the Times and Free Press editorial pages.)	Split endorsement	October 12	Chattanooga	Tennessee	Split endorsement
Kingsport Times-News	No endorsement	October 18	Kingsport	Tennessee	
San Antonio Express-News	Kamala Harris	October 18	San Antonio	Texas	Joe Biden
The Boston Globe	Kamala Harris	October 18	Boston	Massachusetts	Joe Biden
The Republican	Kamala Harris	October 18	Springfield	Massachusetts	Joe Biden
The Everett Herald	Kamala Harris	October 19	Everett	Washington	
The Sun Chronicle	Kamala Harris	October 19	Attleboro	Massachusetts	
The Star-Ledger	Kamala Harris	October 20	Newark	New Jersey	Joe Biden
Pittsburgh Tribune-Review	No endorsement	October 20	Pittsburgh	Pennsylvania	
The Plain Dealer	Kamala Harris	October 20	Cleveland	Ohio	Joe Biden
Las Vegas Sun	Kamala Harris	October 20	Las Vegas	Nevada	Joe Biden
Honolulu Star-Advertiser	Kamala Harris	October 20	Honolulu	Hawaii	Joe Biden
Republican-American	Donald Trump	October 20	Waterbury	Connecticut	Donald Trump
Bangor Daily News	Kamala Harris	October 21	Bangor	Maine	Joe Biden
Los Angeles Times (Note: Announced endorsements for other election races on October 14. It was later reported they would not endorse a candidate in the Presidential race. The decision not to endorse was made by Times owner Patrick Soon-Shiong.)	No endorsement	October 22	Los Angeles	California	Joe Biden
The Tribune-Democrat	Kamala Harris	October 24	Johnstown	Pennsylvania	Joe Biden
The Jersey Journal	Kamala Harris	October 24	Secaucus	New Jersey	Joe Biden
The Manhattan Mercury	No endorsement	October 24	Manhattan	Kansas	
The Washington Post	No endorsement (Note: The paper has discontinued endorsing candidates for president. The decision not to endorse was reportedly made by Post owner Jeff Bezos.)	October 25	Washington	District of Columbia	Joe Biden
The Philadelphia Inquirer	Kamala Harris	October 25	Philadelphia	Pennsylvania	Joe Biden
The Philadelphia Tribune	Kamala Harris	October 25	Philadelphia	Pennsylvania	Joe Biden
Eastside Daily News	Kamala Harris	October 25	Cleveland	Ohio	
The Press Democrat	Kamala Harris	October 25	Santa Rosa	California	Joe Biden
Houston Chronicle	Kamala Harris	October 25	Houston	Texas	Joe Biden
Connecticut Post (Note: Connecticut Hearst Media made an endorsement for President. This endorsement is a joint endorsement between the media group’s newspapers.)	Kamala Harris	October 25	Bridgeport	Connecticut	
Greenwich Time	Kamala Harris	October 25	Greenwich	Connecticut	
The Middletown Press	Kamala Harris	October 25	Middletown	Connecticut	
The Hour	Kamala Harris	October 25	Norwalk	Connecticut	
Stamford Advocate	Kamala Harris	October 25	Stamford	Connecticut	Joe Biden
The News-Times	Kamala Harris	October 25	Danbury	Connecticut	
The Register Citizen	Kamala Harris	October 25	Torrington	Connecticut	
New Haven Register	Kamala Harris	October 25	New Haven	Connecticut	
Journal Inquirer	Kamala Harris	October 25	Manchester	Connecticut	
Times Union	Kamala Harris	October 25	Albany	New York	Joe Biden
New York Post	Donald Trump	October 25	New York	New York	Donald Trump
Newsday	Kamala Harris	October 26	Long Island	New York	Joe Biden
The Santa Clarita Valley Signal	Donald Trump	October 26	Santa Clarita	California	
The Durango Herald	Kamala Harris	October 27	Durango	Colorado	Joe Biden
The Buffalo News	Kamala Harris	October 27	Buffalo	New York	Joe Biden
Lincoln Journal Star	Kamala Harris	October 27	Lincoln	Nebraska	Joe Biden
El Diario La Prensa	Kamala Harris	October 28	New York	New York	
Tampa Bay Times	No endorsement	October 28	St. Petersburg	Florida	Joe Biden
USA Today	No endorsement	October 28	McLean	Virginia	Joe Biden
The Des Moines Register	No endorsement	October 29	Des Moines	Iowa	Joe Biden
Detroit Free Press	No endorsement	October 29	Detroit	Michigan	Joe Biden
El Nuevo Día	Kamala Harris	October 29	Guaynabo	Puerto Rico	Joe Biden
The Charlotte Observer	Kamala Harris	October 29	Charlotte	North Carolina	No endorsement
The News & Observer	Kamala Harris	October 29	Raleigh	North Carolina	No endorsement
The Daily Item	Kamala Harris	October 29	Sunbury	Pennsylvania	
The Keene Sentinel	Kamala Harris	October 29	Keene	New Hampshire	
St. Louis Post-Dispatch	Kamala Harris	October 30	St. Louis	Missouri	Joe Biden
Bozeman Daily Chronicle	No endorsement	October 30	Bozeman	Montana	
The Post-Standard	Kamala Harris	October 31	Syracuse	New York	
The Anderson Observer	Kamala Harris	October 31	Anderson	South Carolina	No endorsement
The Gazette	Kamala Harris	November 1	Cedar Rapids	Iowa	
Arizona Daily Star	Kamala Harris	November 1	Tucson	Arizona	Joe Biden
The Bakersfield Californian	No endorsement	November 2	Bakersfield	California	
New Hampshire Union Leader	No endorsement	November 2	Manchester	New Hampshire	Joe Biden
San Francisco Chronicle	Kamala Harris	November 3	San Francisco	California	Joe Biden
The Blade	No endorsement	November 3	Toledo	Ohio	Donald Trump
Staten Island Advance	Kamala Harris	November 3	Staten Island	New York	Joe Biden
Chicago Tribune	No endorsement	November 3	Chicago	Illinois	Joe Biden
Adirondack Daily Enterprise	No endorsement	November 4	Saranac Lake	New York	

== Weekly newspapers ==
=== Summary of weekly newspapers ===
Candidate	Endorsements
Kamala Harris	128
Donald Trump	11
No endorsement	14

=== Endorsements ===
Newspaper	2024 endorsement	Endorsement date	City	State	2020 endorsement
Laurel Leader-Call	Donald Trump	March 17	Laurel	Mississippi	Donald Trump
Atlanta Inquirer	Kamala Harris	July 21	Atlanta	Georgia	
Atlanta Voice (Note: Word in Black endorsed Harris for President. This endorsement is a joint endorsement between the media group’s newspapers.)	Kamala Harris	July 21	Atlanta	Georgia	No endorsement
The Dallas Weekly	Kamala Harris	July 21	Dallas	Texas	No endorsement
Michigan Chronicle	Kamala Harris	July 21	Detroit	Michigan	No endorsement
The Washington Informer	Kamala Harris	July 21	Washington	District of Columbia	No endorsement
Houston Defender	Kamala Harris	July 22	Houston	Texas	No endorsement
The Sacramento Observer	Kamala Harris	July 23	Sacramento	California	No endorsement
Storm Lake Times (Note: Previously endorsed Asa Hutchinson, then Joe Biden)	Kamala Harris	July 23	Storm Lake	Iowa	Joe Biden
New York Carib News	Kamala Harris	July 24	New York City	New York	Joe Biden
Bay Area Reporter	Kamala Harris	July 24	San Francisco	California	Joe Biden
The Bay State Banner	Kamala Harris	July 24	Boston	Massachusetts	
New York Amsterdam News	Kamala Harris	July 24	New York	New York	No endorsement
Baltimore Afro-American	Kamala Harris	July 26	Baltimore	Maryland	No endorsement
Seattle Medium	Kamala Harris	July 26	Seattle	Washington	No endorsement
The St. Louis American	Kamala Harris	July 26	St. Louis	Missouri	No endorsement
The Jewish Voice	Donald Trump	August 14	Brooklyn	New York	Donald Trump
The Indian Panorama	Kamala Harris	August 16	New York City	New York	
The Capital Times	Kamala Harris	August 21	Madison	Wisconsin	Joe Biden
Ouachita Citizen	Donald Trump	August 28	West Monroe	Louisiana	Donald Trump
Tennessee Tribune	Kamala Harris	September 4	Nashville	Tennessee	Joe Biden
Charleston City Paper	Kamala Harris	September 6	Charleston	South Carolina	Joe Biden
Addison County Independent	Kamala Harris	September 12	Middlebury	Vermont	No endorsement
Los Angeles Sentinel	Kamala Harris	September 18	Los Angeles	California	No endorsement
Bay Windows	Kamala Harris	September 19	Boston	Massachusetts	Joe Biden
Dallas Voice	Kamala Harris	September 27	Dallas	Texas	Joe Biden
San Francisco Bay Guardian	Kamala Harris	September 28	San Francisco	California	
Seattle Gay News	Kamala Harris	September 29	Seattle	Washington	No endorsement
Santa Barbara Independent	Kamala Harris	October 3	Santa Barbara	California	Joe Biden
The Shepherd Express	Kamala Harris	October 3	Milwaukee	Wisconsin	No endorsement
Out South Florida	Kamala Harris	October 9	Wilton Manors	Florida	
Boulder Weekly	No endorsement	October 9	Boulder	Colorado	Joe Biden
Winston-Salem Chronicle	Kamala Harris	October 10	Winston-Salem	North Carolina	Joe Biden
Montecito Journal	Kamala Harris	October 10	Montecito	California	
Monterey County Weekly	Kamala Harris	October 10	Seaside	California	Joe Biden
Northwest Asian Weekly	Kamala Harris	October 10	Seattle	Washington	Joe Biden
Washington Jewish Week	Kamala Harris	October 16	Rockville	Maryland	Joe Biden
The Jewish Exponent	Kamala Harris	October 16	Philadelphia	Pennsylvania	Joe Biden
High Plains Reader	Kamala Harris	October 16	Fargo	North Dakota	
Willamette Week	Kamala Harris	October 16	Portland	Oregon	Joe Biden
The Charlotte Post	Kamala Harris	October 16	Charlotte	North Carolina	Joe Biden
The Stranger	Kamala Harris	October 16	Seattle	Washington	Joe Biden
Portland Mercury	Kamala Harris	October 16	Portland	Oregon	
Taos News	Kamala Harris	October 16	Taos	New Mexico	Joe Biden
Caribbean National Weekly	Kamala Harris	October 17	Fort Lauderdale	Florida	Joe Biden
North Coast Journal	Kamala Harris	October 17	Eureka	California	
The Austin Chronicle	Kamala Harris	October 17	Austin	Texas	Joe Biden
Eugene Weekly	Kamala Harris	October 17	Eugene	Oregon	Joe Biden
Las Vegas Weekly	Kamala Harris	October 17	Las Vegas	Nevada	
Dorchester Reporter	Kamala Harris	October 17	Dorchester	Massachusetts	Joe Biden
Baltimore Jewish Times	Kamala Harris	October 17	Baltimore	Massachusetts	Joe Biden
Triad City Beat	No endorsement	October 17	Greensboro	North Carolina	
Garland Journal	Kamala Harris	October 17	Garland	Texas	
The Arab American News (Note: The editorial discourages voting for either Trump or Harris, while remaining silent on other candidates.)	No endorsement	October 18	Dearborn	Michigan	Joe Biden
The Enterprise Sandwich	No endorsement	October 18	Falmouth	Massachusetts	
The Bourne Enterprise	No endorsement	October 18	Bourne	Massachusetts	
Johnson City Press	No endorsement	October 18	Johnson City	Tennessee	
Arkansas Times	Kamala Harris	October 20	Little Rock	Arkansas	
The Louisiana Weekly	Kamala Harris	October 21	New Orleans	Louisiana	Joe Biden
The Jewish Press	Donald Trump	October 22	Brooklyn	New York	Donald Trump
Arizona Informant	Kamala Harris	October 23	Phoenix	Arizona	
Bernardsville News (Note: New Jersey Hills Media Group endorsed Harris for President. This endorsement is a joint endorsement between the media group’s newspapers.)	Kamala Harris	October 23	Bernardsville	New Jersey	Joe Biden
Echoes-Sentinel	Kamala Harris	October 23	Long Hill Township	New Jersey	
Florham Park Eagle	Kamala Harris	October 23	Florham Park	New Jersey	
Hanover Eagle	Kamala Harris	October 23	Hanover	New Jersey	
Madison Eagle	Kamala Harris	October 23	Madison	New Jersey	
Hunterdon Review	Kamala Harris	October 23	Hunterdon County	New Jersey	
Mount Olive Chronicle	Kamala Harris	October 23	Mt. Olive Township	New Jersey	
Observer-Tribune	Kamala Harris	October 23	Washington Township	New Jersey	
The Progress	Kamala Harris	October 23	Whippany	New Jersey	
Roxbury Register	Kamala Harris	October 23	Roxbury	New Jersey	
West Morris Reporter	Kamala Harris	October 23	Chester Township	New Jersey	
The Citizen	Kamala Harris	October 23	Rockaway	New Jersey	
Savannah Tribune	Kamala Harris	October 23	Savannah	Georgia	
The Irish Echo	Kamala Harris	October 23	New York	New York	Joe Biden
The Source Weekly	Kamala Harris	October 23	Bend	Oregon	Joe Biden
Morris NewsBee	Kamala Harris	October 24	Morristown	New Jersey	
Chatham Courier	Kamala Harris	October 24	Chatham	New Jersey	
Sun-Reporter	Kamala Harris	October 24	San Francisco	California	
Watermark Online	Kamala Harris	October 24	Orlando	Florida	Joe Biden
Mitchell Daily Republic	No endorsement	October 24	Mitchell	South Dakota	
Richmond Free Press	Kamala Harris	October 24	Richmond	Virginia	Joe Biden
East County Observer (Note: Observer Media Group endorsed Trump for President. This endorsement is a joint endorsement between the media group’s newspaper)	Donald Trump	October 24	Sarasota	Florida	
Longboat Observer	Donald Trump	October 24	Longboat Key	Florida	
Siesta Key Observer	Donald Trump	October 24	Siesta Key	Florida	
Sarasota Observer	Donald Trump	October 24	Sarasota	Florida	
Creative Loafing Tampa Bay	Kamala Harris	October 24	Tampa	Florida	
Tulsa Beacon	Donald Trump	October 24	Tulsa	Oklahoma	
The California Advocate	Kamala Harris	October 24	Fresno	California	
Carolina Peacemaker	Kamala Harris	October 25	Greensboro	North Carolina	
The Darien Times	Kamala Harris	October 25	Darien	Connecticut	
The Milford Mirror	Kamala Harris	October 25	Milford	Connecticut	
New Canaan Advertiser	Kamala Harris	October 25	New Canaan	Connecticut	
The Ridgefield Press	Kamala Harris	October 25	Ridgefield	Connecticut	
The Shelton Herald	Kamala Harris	October 25	Shelton	Connecticut	
The Trumbull Times	Kamala Harris	October 25	Trumbull	Connecticut	
The Wilton Bulletin	Kamala Harris	October 25	Wilton	Connecticut	
The Martha's Vineyard Times	Kamala Harris	October 25	Vineyard Haven	Massachusetts	Joe Biden
The Georgia Voice	Kamala Harris	October 25	Atlanta	Georgia	Joe Biden
The Gainesville Iguana	Kamala Harris	October 26	Gainesville	Florida	
La Gaceta	Kamala Harris	October 27	Tampa	Florida	Joe Biden
Gary Crusader	Kamala Harris	October 28	Gary	Indiana	Joe Biden
The West Side Spirit	Kamala Harris	October 28	Manhattan	New York	
Philadelphia Gay News	Kamala Harris	October 29	Philadelphia	Pennsylvania	Joe Biden
The Skanner	Kamala Harris	October 29	Portland	Oregon	Joe Biden
The Champion Newspaper	Kamala Harris	October 30	Decatur	Georgia	
The Irish Echo	Kamala Harris	October 30	New York	New York	
Idaho Mountain Express	Kamala Harris	October 30	Ketchum	Idaho	Joe Biden
Malheur Enterprise	Kamala Harris	October 30	Vale	Oregon	
Greene County Democrat	Kamala Harris	October 30	Eutaw	Alabama	
La Voz Colorado	Kamala Harris	October 30	Thornton	Colorado	
Chatham-Southeast Citizen	Kamala Harris	October 30	Chatham	Illinois	
Suburban Times Citizen	Kamala Harris	October 30	Chicago	Illinois	
Weekend Citizen	Kamala Harris	October 30	Chicago	Illinois	
South End Citizen	Kamala Harris	October 30	Chicago	Illinois	
South Suburban Citizen	Kamala Harris	October 30	Chicago	Illinois	
Barrington Times (Note: East Bay Media Group endorsed Harris for President. This endorsement is a joint endorsement between the media group’s newspapers.)	Kamala Harris	October 30	Barrington	Rhode Island	
Bristol Phoenix	Kamala Harris	October 30	Bristol	Rhode Island	
East Providence Post	Kamala Harris	October 30	East Providence	Rhode Island	
Portsmouth Times	Kamala Harris	October 30	Portsmouth	Rhode Island	
Sakonnet Times	Kamala Harris	October 30	Tiverton	Rhode Island	
Warren Times-Gazette	Kamala Harris	October 30	Bristol	Rhode Island	
Westport Shorelines	Kamala Harris	October 30	Westport	Massachusetts	
The Milwaukee Community Journal	Kamala Harris	October 30	Milwaukee	Wisconsin	
Beverly Press	Kamala Harris	October 30	Los Angeles	California	
Park Labrea News	Kamala Harris	October 30	Los Angeles	California	
The South Shore Press	Donald Trump	October 30	Mastic Beach	New York	
Falls Church News-Press	Kamala Harris	October 31	Falls Church	Virginia	Joe Biden
Island Beachcomber	Kamala Harris	October 31	Vashon	Washington	
The Cape Cod Chronicle	Kamala Harris	October 31	Chatham	Massachusetts	
The Chicago Crusader	Kamala Harris	October 31	Chicago	Illinois	Joe Biden
San Francisco Bay Times	Kamala Harris	October 31	San Francisco	California	
Jewish Standard	No endorsement	October 31	Teaneck	New Jersey	
Queens Chronicle	No endorsement	October 31	Queens	New York	
Five Towns Jewish Times	Donald Trump	October 31	Lawrence	New York	
Flatbush Jewish Journal	No endorsement	October 31	New York	New York	
Queens Community News (Note: The Harlem Community Newspapers, Inc. endorsed Harris for President. This endorsement is a joint endorsement between the group’s newspapers.)	Kamala Harris	October 31	Queens	New York	
Brooklyn Community News	Kamala Harris	October 31	Brooklyn	New York	
Bronx Community News	Kamala Harris	October 31	Bronx	New York	
Harlem Community News	Kamala Harris	October 31	Harlem	New York	
New Jersey Jewish News	No endorsement	October 31	River Edge	New Jersey	No endorsement
Lake Placid News	No endorsement	October 31	Lake Placid	New York	
The Kansas City Globe	Kamala Harris	November 1	Kansas City	Missouri	
New Pittsburgh Courier	Kamala Harris	November 1	Pittsburgh	Pennsylvania	
InsideNoVa	No endorsement	November 1	Woodbridge	Virginia	
Washington Blade	Kamala Harris	November 1	Washington	District of Columbia	Joe Biden
The Ely Echo	No endorsement	November 1	Ely	Minnesota	
Monadnock Ledger-Transcript	Kamala Harris	November 1	Peterborough	New Hampshire	
Milwaukee Courier	Kamala Harris	November 2	Milwaukee	Wisconsin	
The Data News Weekly	Kamala Harris	November 2	New Orleans	Louisiana	
The Chicago Defender	Kamala Harris	November 3	Chicago	Illinois	
Jackson Advocate	Kamala Harris	November 4	Jackson	Mississippi	
Highly Capitalized Network	Kamala Harris	November 4	Santa Monica	California	

== Monthly newspapers ==
=== Summary of monthly newspapers ===
Candidate	Endorsements
Kamala Harris	5
Donald Trump	1

=== Endorsements ===
Newspaper	2024 endorsement	Endorsement date	City	State	2020 endorsement
L.A. Focus	Kamala Harris	August 1	Los Angeles	California	No endorsement
Boston Irish	Kamala Harris	September 10	Boston	Massachusetts	Joe Biden
The Georgetowner	Kamala Harris	October 9	Washington	District of Columbia	Joe Biden
San Francisco Bay View (Note: The editorial is conditional on swing states and encourages other voters to support Jill Stein.)	Kamala Harris	October 14	San Francisco	California	Joe Biden
Queens County Beacon	Donald Trump	October 24	Queens	New York	
The New Orleans Tribune	Kamala Harris	October 28	New Orleans	Louisiana	

== College and university newspapers ==
=== Summary of college and university newspapers ===
Candidate	Endorsements
Kamala Harris	18
Not Donald Trump	1

=== Endorsements ===
Newspaper	2024 endorsement	Endorsement date	City	State	2020 endorsement
The Georgetown Voice (Georgetown University)	Kamala Harris	September 2	Washington	District of Columbia	Joe Biden
The Johns Hopkins News-Letter (Johns Hopkins University)	Kamala Harris	October 10	Baltimore	Maryland	
The Slate (Shippensburg University of Pennsylvania)	Kamala Harris	October 22	Shippensburg	Pennsylvania	No endorsement
The Cornell Daily Sun (Cornell University)	Kamala Harris	October 23	Ithaca	New York	Joe Biden
The Michigan Daily (University of Michigan)	Kamala Harris	October 27	Ann Arbor	Michigan	Joe Biden
Talon Marks (Cerritos College)	Kamala Harris	October 28	Norwalk	California	
Experience (Los Medanos College)	Kamala Harris	October 29	Pittsburg	California	
The Villanovan (Villanova University)	Kamala Harris	October 30	Villanova	Pennsylvania	
Tulane Hullabaloo (Tulane University)	Kamala Harris	October 31	New Orleans	Louisiana	
The Daily Pennsylvanian (University of Pennsylvania)	Kamala Harris	October 31	Philadelphia	Pennsylvania	Joe Biden
Marquette Wire (Marquette University)	Kamala Harris	October 31	Milwaukee	Wisconsin	
The Gatepost (Framingham State University)	Kamala Harris	October 31	Framingham	Massachusetts	
Columbia Daily Spectator (Columbia University)	Kamala Harris	October 31	New York	New York	
The Daily Texan (University of Texas at Austin)	Kamala Harris	November 1	Austin	Texas	
The Oak Leaf (Santa Rosa Junior College)	Kamala Harris	November 1	Santa Rosa	California	
The Oberlin Review (Oberlin College)	Kamala Harris	November 1	Oberlin	Ohio	
Daily Bruin (University of California, Los Angeles)	Kamala Harris	November 3	Los Angeles	California	Joe Biden
The Daily Iowan (University of Iowa)	Kamala Harris	November 3	Iowa City	Iowa	Joe Biden
The Temple News (Temple University)	Not Donald Trump	November 5	Philadelphia	Pennsylvania	

== High school newspapers ==
=== Summary of high school newspapers ===
Candidate	Endorsements
Kamala Harris	6
No endorsement	1

=== Endorsements ===
Newspaper	2024 endorsement	Endorsement date	City	State	2020 endorsement
The Spectator (Stuyvesant High School)	Kamala Harris	September 7	New York City	New York	Joe Biden
The Olympian (Castro Valley High School)	Kamala Harris	October 10	Castro Valley	California	
Wildcat Chronicle (Community High School)	No endorsement	October 10	West Chicago	Illinois	
The Norse Star (Stoughton High School)	Kamala Harris	October 31	Stoughton	Wisconsin	
The Shakerite (Shaker Heights High School)	Kamala Harris	November 4	Shaker Heights	Ohio	
The Talon (Los Altos High School)	Kamala Harris	November 5	Los Altos	California	
The Islander (Mercer Island High School)	Kamala Harris	November 5	Mercer Island	Washington	

== Magazines ==
=== Summary of magazines ===
Candidate	Endorsements
Kamala Harris	31
Donald Trump	1
No endorsement	2

=== Endorsements ===
Magazine	2024 endorsement	Endorsement date	City	State	2020 endorsement
Soigne' + Swank Magazine	Kamala Harris	July 21	Wabasso	Florida	No endorsement
Harvest Magazine	Kamala Harris	July 21	New York	New York	No endorsement
Vogue	Kamala Harris	July 23	New York	New York	No endorsement
Chicago Latina Magazine	Kamala Harris	July 23	Chicago	Illinois	No endorsement
Urban Magazine	Kamala Harris	July 24			No endorsement
Oldster Magazine	Kamala Harris	July 26			
Kazoo	Kamala Harris	July 29	New York	New York	Joe Biden
The Source	Kamala Harris	August 1	New York	New York	No endorsement
Caribbean POSH	Kamala Harris	August 16	Charlotte Amalie	United States Virgin Islands	
The Nurses Magazine	Kamala Harris	September 15	Orlando	Florida	
Scientific American	Kamala Harris	September 16	New York	New York	Joe Biden
Rolling Stone	Kamala Harris	September 21	New York	New York	Joe Biden
The Nation	Kamala Harris	September 23	New York	New York	Joe Biden
Chemical & Engineering News	No endorsement	September 27			No endorsement
The New Yorker	Kamala Harris	September 29	New York	New York	Joe Biden
Virgin Beauty Magazine	Kamala Harris	October 1	Liberty Lake	Washington	
Adelante Magazine	Kamala Harris	October 1	Los Angeles	California	
Las Vegas Spectrum	Kamala Harris	October 1	Las Vegas	Nevada	
Lexington Living Magazine	Kamala Harris	October 9	Lexington	Kentucky	
The Atlantic	Kamala Harris	October 10	Washington	District of Columbia	Joe Biden
The Advocate	Kamala Harris	October 15	Los Angeles	California	Joe Biden
Outdoor Life	No endorsement	October 16	New York	New York	
Maxim	Donald Trump	October 17	New York	New York	
Yellow Scene Magazine	Kamala Harris	October 21	Boulder	Colorado	
Los Angeles	Kamala Harris	October 24	Los Angeles	California	
Ambush Magazine	Kamala Harris	October 25	New Orleans	Louisiana	
San Diego Jewish World	Kamala Harris	October 28	San Diego	California	
Seattle’s Child	Kamala Harris	October 29	Seattle	Washington	
GO	Kamala Harris	October 31	New York City	New York	
Nashville Voice	Kamala Harris	October 31	Nashville	Tennessee	
Houston Style Magazine	Kamala Harris	October 31	Houston	Texas	
Metro Weekly	Kamala Harris	October 31	Washington	DC	Joe Biden
RIFF Magazine	Kamala Harris	November 1	San Francisco	California	
Minnesota Women's Press	Kamala Harris	November 1	Minneapolis	Minnesota	

== Scientific journals ==
=== Summary of scientific journals ===
Candidate	Endorsements
Kamala Harris	1

=== Endorsements ===
Journal	2024 endorsement	Endorsement date	2020 endorsement
Nature	Kamala Harris	October 28	Joe Biden

== Literary journals ==
=== Summary of literary journals ===
Candidate	Endorsements
Kamala Harris	5

=== Endorsements ===
Journal	2024 endorsement	Endorsement date	2020 endorsement
Littsburgh	Kamala Harris	October 1	
Silent Book Club	Kamala Harris	October 26	
Scoundrel Time	Kamala Harris	October 31	
Regarp Book Blog	Kamala Harris	November 1	
Fantasy Author's Handbook	Kamala Harris	November 5	

== Foreign periodicals ==
=== Summary of foreign periodicals ===
Candidate	Endorsements
Kamala Harris	14
Not Donald Trump	1
No endorsement	1

=== Endorsements ===
Newspaper	2024 endorsement	Endorsement date	City	Country	2020 endorsement
Barbados Today	Kamala Harris	July 24	Bridgetown	Barbados	
Times of Malta	Kamala Harris	July 31	Valletta	Malta	Joe Biden
Lëtzebuerger Journal	Kamala Harris	August 6	Luxembourg City	Luxembourg	
The Hindu	Kamala Harris	August 7	Chennai	India	Joe Biden
Irish Independent	Kamala Harris	September 14	Dublin	Ireland	Joe Biden
The Jerusalem Post	No endorsement	October 11	Jerusalem	Israel	
Irish Examiner	Kamala Harris	October 22	Cork	Ireland	Not Donald Trump
The Guardian	Kamala Harris	October 23	London	United Kingdom	Joe Biden
The Observer	Kamala Harris	October 26	London	United Kingdom	Joe Biden
Financial Mail	Kamala Harris	October 31	Johannesburg	South Africa	
The Economist	Kamala Harris	October 31	London	United Kingdom	Joe Biden
Financial Times	Kamala Harris	November 1	London	United Kingdom	Joe Biden
SEE Magazine	Kamala Harris	November 1	Abuja	Nigeria	
The Globe and Mail	Kamala Harris	November 2	Toronto	Canada	Joe Biden
The Sydney Morning Herald	Kamala Harris	November 4	Sydney	Australia	Joe Biden
Haaretz	Not Donald Trump	November 5	Tel Aviv	Israel	Not Donald Trump

== Online news outlets ==
Website	2024 endorsement	Endorsement date	City	State	2020 endorsement
Human Events	Donald Trump	March 7	Washington	District of Columbia	No endorsement
The Militant	Rachele Fruit	April 25	New York	New York	No endorsement
Daily Kos	Kamala Harris	July 21			No endorsement
Palmer Report	Kamala Harris	July 22			No endorsement
InsiderNJ	Kamala Harris	July 23		New Jersey	
PennLive	No endorsement	August 23	Mechanicsburg	Pennsylvania	Joe Biden
Deerfield News	Kamala Harris	September 11	Deerfield Beach	Florida	Joe Biden
Law Enforcement Today	Donald Trump	September 12			No endorsement
Book Riot	Kamala Harris	October 1			No endorsement
The Onion	Joe Biden	October 2	Chicago	Illinois	No endorsement
Cleveland.com	Kamala Harris	October 20	Cleveland	Ohio	Joe Biden
NewBostonPost	Donald Trump	October 21	Boston	Massachusetts	No endorsement
Awards Radar	Kamala Harris	October 25			Joe Biden
The Transportist	Kamala Harris	October 25			
The New York Sun	Donald Trump	October 27	New York	New York	Donald Trump
PRovoke Media	Kamala Harris	October 27	New York City	New York	
TheGrio	Kamala Harris	October 28	Beverly Hills	California	
The Verge	Kamala Harris	October 29	New York	New York	
BuzzFeed	Kamala Harris	October 30	New York	New York	
OnStage Blog	Kamala Harris	October 30			
Black Star News	Kamala Harris	October 31	New York	New York	
RealVail.com	Kamala Harris	October 31	Vail	Colorado	
Milwaukee Independent	Kamala Harris	November 2	Milwaukee	Wisconsin	
WhoWhatWhy	Kamala Harris	November 2	New York	New York	
Broadband Breakfast	Kamala Harris	November 4	Washington	D.C.	
Townhall	Donald Trump	November 4			

== Newspaper non-endorsements ==
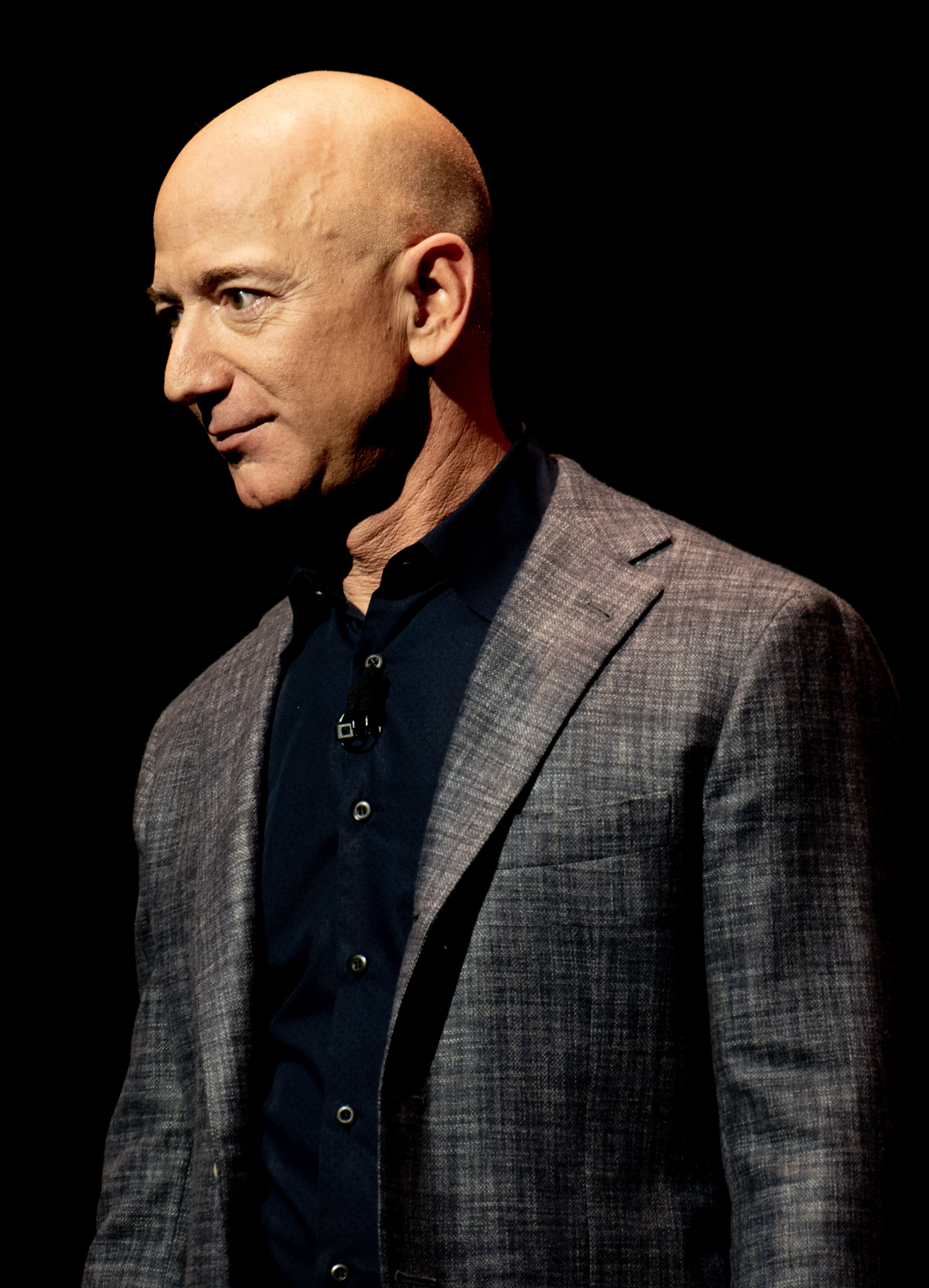
Jeff Bezos in 2019

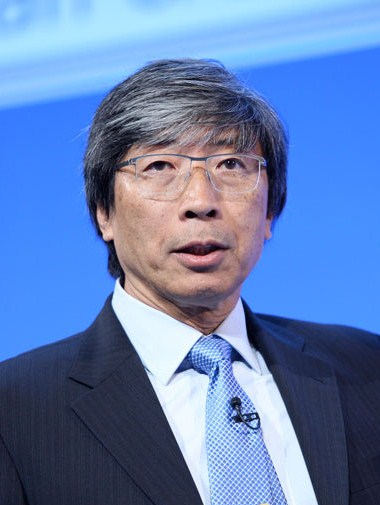
Patrick Soon-Shiong in 2014

According to a study by Nieman Labs, nearly three-quarters of the country's major newspapers declined to issue a presidential endorsement in the 2024 election. The organization defined "major newspaper" as the one hundred largest daily newspapers. They found an increase among major newspaper making no endorsement from 9 in 2004, to 8 in 2008, to 23 in 2012, to 26 in 2016, to 44 in 2020 to 71 non-endorsers in 2024.

The editorial boards of the Washington Post and Los Angeles Times planned to endorse Kamala Harris. The owners of the newspapers stopped their papers from publishing the endorsements less than two weeks before Election Day. The Post's owner since 2013, Jeff Bezos, instructed publisher William Lewis to not make an endorsement. The newspaper regularly endorsed presidential candidates since 1976. Patrick Soon-Shiong, the owner of the Times since 2018, also blocked an endorsement in the 2020 primaries. Newspaper editorials can reflect the views of the owners, who can play a role in the endorsement and sign off on them.

=== Nonprofit news outlets ===
501(c)3 nonprofit news organizations do not endorse due to limitations associated with their non-profit status.

=== Prior to the 2024 election cycle ===
In 2020, the McClatchy group announced it would not be endorsing presidential candidates in that year's election. That includes the Miami Herald and El Nuevo Herald.

The Chicago Sun-Times, which endorsed Biden in 2020, announced in 2022 that it would no longer make political endorsements.

In 2022, Alden Global Capital announced that its newspapers would no longer endorse presidential candidates. This included the Chicago Tribune, South Florida Sun Sentinel, Times-Standard, the Hartford Courant, The San Diego Union-Tribune, The Mercury News, East Bay Times, and the New York Daily News, all of which endorsed Biden in 2020.

The Santa Barbara News-Press, which endorsed Trump in 2020, ceased publication in 2023.

The Poynter Institute noted that moves by the owners of The Washington Post and Los Angeles Times (as well as the Minnesota Star Tribune) to stop endorsing presidential candidates follow a trend seen at regional newspapers. Newspaper chains Gannett, McClatchy, and Alden-owned MediaNews Group and Tribune Publishing have largely ended endorsements.

=== The Los Angeles Times ===
The decision by owner Patrick Soon-Shiong to not run the editorial board's endorsement of Kamala Harris prompted the resignation of the Times' editorials editor, Mariel Garza, alongside multiple other staffers. They have also led to significant subscription cancellations.

=== The Washington Post ===
A Harris endorsement was drafted by the editorials department in early October and sent to Bezos for a final sign-off, who decided to not publish it. William Lewis, the publisher and chief executive officer of the paper, published an essay giving his reasons for the choice to not issue an endorsement. Lewis said that the primary reason was "returning to our roots" of not endorsing in presidential contests, and giving a history, which included the Post starting to endorse in 1976.

Over several weeks, two editorial board members worked on a draft, which opinion editor David Shipley approved. The endorsement stalled in early October, but mid-month Lewis told the editorial board that the endorsement would continue, adding "this is obviously something our owner has an interest in." During a routine visit to Florida in September, Post leaders including Shipley and Lewis discussed with Bezos the future of the opinion section. Bezos had reservations about endorsing either candidate, and ultimately decided not to publish one. Shipley and Lewis both made an attempt to persuade Bezos to continue with endorsements, but Bezos had been considering this for weeks. He did not read the drafted opinion. Days before the public decision, staffers began talking about the lack of an endorsement, and if there would be one.

The Post's decision was criticized by staffers in the opinions and news divisions. The editorial board was informed by Shipley in a regular meeting, who reacted strongly against the decision. One board member told Semafor that "people are shocked, furious, surprised" at the announcement. The newsroom learned about the decision midday. Robert Kagan, a columnist and editor-at-large resigned within an hour, calling it "an effort by Jeff Bezos to curry favor with Donald Trump in the anticipation of his possible victory". Nineteen Post columnists signed an open letter opposing the decision, calling it "a terrible mistake." Investigative journalists Bob Woodward and Carl Bernstein called the decision "surprising and disappointing". Former executive editor Martin Baron called it "cowardice, with democracy as its casualty". Former editor Marcus Brauchli called it called it "craven". The Post's union, the Washington Post Guild, released a statement of concern. Political cartoonist Ann Telnaes posted an artwork titled "Democracy Dies in Darkness," the motto of the Post, of a rectangle covered in gray paint strokes. Michele Norris resigned two days later, calling it "an insult to the paper’s own longstanding standard of regularly endorsing candidates since 1976."

Readers reacted negatively to the pulling of Harris' endorsement. More than 250,000 subscribers canceled their subscription, and others sent emails to reporters' inboxes to complain. Confused readers of the New York Times canceled subscriptions to the wrong outlet. The Post's chief technology officer directed engineers to block responses from its AI search tool about the decision.

Some critics alleged that Bezos wanted to avoid conflict with Trump. Opinion columnist Dan Froomkin, writing in Salon.com, speculated that Bezos may have been motivated by "anticipatory obedience". Timothy Snyder, who theorizes about anticipatory obedience, also speculated that Bezos may have been driven by this motivation. Trump, in his campaign, has threatened vengeance on the media for negative coverage of him. Bezos' companies have contracts worth billions of dollars with the federal government, such as Blue Origin. Hours after Lewis' statement, Blue Origin executives met with Donald Trump. Amazon, the company Bezos founded, is being sued by the Federal Trade Commission for anticompetitive behavior. Soon-Shiong's pharmaceutical companies are developing drugs that require future approval from the Food and Drug Administration.

Matt Welch, writing for Reason magazine, argued that not endorsing was a cost-cutting measure, citing a Poynter Institute article which stated that editorials are generally among the least-read content of a newspaper.

=== Gannett newspapers ===
The Gannett group announced in October 2024 that its publications would not publish presidential endorsements in the upcoming election, allowing the outlets to endorse candidates at the state and local levels at their own discretion.

USA Today justified its lack of endorsement, noting it had never endorsed any presidential candidate except for Joe Biden in the 2020 presidential election, and that happened due to the “extraordinary moment” in history that required an “extraordinary response” from the paper.

Gannett subsidiaries include the Times Herald-Record, The Palm Beach Post, Detroit Free Press, USA Today, and The Des Moines Register, all of which endorsed Biden in 2020.

=== Others ===
Other independent papers chose not to endorse candidates in the 2024 cycle. The list includes the News-Register, which endorsed Biden in 2020.
