= Jeff Bezos =

American businessman (born 1964)

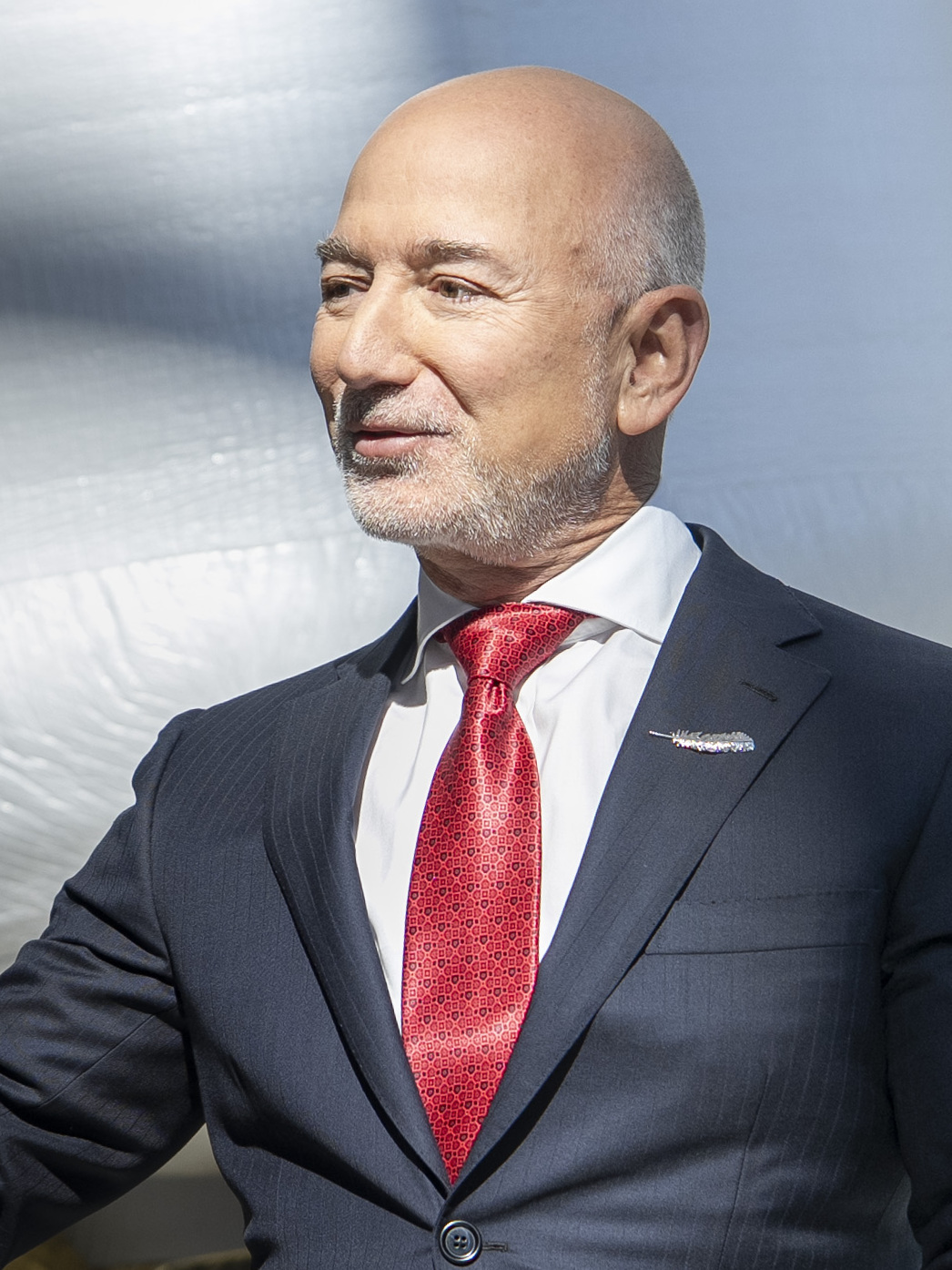
- Bezos in 2026
- Born: Jeffrey Preston Jorgensen; January 12, 1964 (age 62); Albuquerque, New Mexico, U.S.
- Education: Princeton University (BSE)
- Occupations: Businessman; media proprietor; investor
- Known for: Founding Amazon
- Title: Founder and executive chairman of Amazon; Founder of Blue Origin; Owner of The Washington Post; Founder of Bezos Expeditions; Executive chair of Bezos Earth Fund; Founder of Bezos Academy
- Spouses: MacKenzie Tuttle (m. 1993; div. 2019); Lauren Sánchez (m. 2025)
- Children: 4
- Parents: Jackie Bezos (mother); Ted Jorgensen (father); Miguel Bezos (stepfather)
- Relatives: Mark Bezos (half-brother)

Jeffrey Preston Bezos (/ˈbeɪzoʊs/ BAY-zohss; né Jorgensen; born January 12, 1964) is an American businessman, and the founder, executive chairman, and former president and CEO of Amazon, the world's largest e-commerce and cloud computing company. According to the Bloomberg Billionaires Index and Forbes, he was the world's wealthiest person from 2017 to 2021, and in 2026, his net worth was approximately US$284 billion. He is commonly considered part of the global elite.

Bezos was born in Albuquerque, and raised in Houston and Miami. He graduated from Princeton University in 1986 with a degree in engineering. He worked on Wall Street in a variety of related fields from 1986 to early 1994. He founded Amazon in mid-1994 on a road trip from New York City to Seattle. The company began as an online bookstore and expanded to a variety of other e-commerce products and services, including video and audio streaming, cloud computing, and artificial intelligence. It is the world's largest online sales company, the largest Internet company by revenue, and the largest provider of virtual assistants and cloud infrastructure services through its Amazon Web Services branch.

Bezos founded the aerospace manufacturer and sub-orbital spaceflight services company Blue Origin in 2000, and he flew into space on Blue Origin NS-16 in 2021. He purchased the major American newspaper The Washington Post in 2013 and manages many other investments through his venture capital firm, Bezos Expeditions.

The first centibillionaire on the Forbes Real Time Billionaires Index, Bezos was named the "richest man in modern history" after his net worth increased to $150 billion in July 2018 (equivalent to $1.9×10^{11} in 2025). On July 5, 2021, Bezos took over the role of executive chairman and stepped down as the CEO and president of Amazon, succeeded by Amazon Web Services CEO Andy Jassy.

== Early life and education ==
Bezos was born Jeffrey Preston Jorgensen on January 12, 1964, in Albuquerque, New Mexico, to Jacklyn (née Gise; 1946–2025) and Ted Jorgensen (1944–2015). At the time of his birth, his mother was a 17-year-old high-school student and his father was 19. Ted was a Danish American unicyclist born in Chicago to a family of Baptists. After completing high school despite challenging conditions, Jacklyn attended night school, bringing her baby with her. Jeff attended a Montessori school in Albuquerque when he was two.

Ted struggled with alcohol and with his finances. Jacklyn left her husband to live with her parents, filing for divorce in June 1965 when Jeff was 17 months old. After his parents divorced, his mother married Cuban immigrant Miguel "Mike" Bezos in April 1968. Shortly after the wedding, Mike adopted 4-year-old Jeff, whose surname was then legally changed from Jorgensen to Bezos. Jacklyn, her husband, and her son left the area and asked Ted to discontinue contact, to which he agreed.

After Mike received his degree from the University of New Mexico, the family moved to Houston, Texas, so that he could begin working as an engineer for Exxon. Jeff attended River Oaks Elementary School in Houston from fourth to sixth grade. Jeff's maternal grandfather was Lawrence Preston Gise, a regional director of the U.S. Atomic Energy Commission (AEC) in Albuquerque.

Gise retired early to his family's ranch near Cotulla, Texas, where his grandson would spend many summers in his youth and which he would later purchase and expand from 25,000 acres (10,117 ha) to 160,000 acres (64,750 ha). Jeff displayed scientific interests and technological proficiency and once rigged an electric alarm to keep his younger half-siblings out of his room. The family moved to Miami, Florida, where Jeff attended Miami Palmetto High School. In high school, he worked at McDonald's as a short-order line cook during the breakfast shift.

Bezos attended the Student Science Training Program at the University of Florida. He was high school valedictorian, a National Merit Scholar, and a Silver Knight Award winner in 1982. In his graduation speech, Bezos spoke about the possibility of human space colonization. A local newspaper quoted him as saying that he hoped humanity would eventually move heavy industry and large populations into space while preserving Earth as "a huge national park".

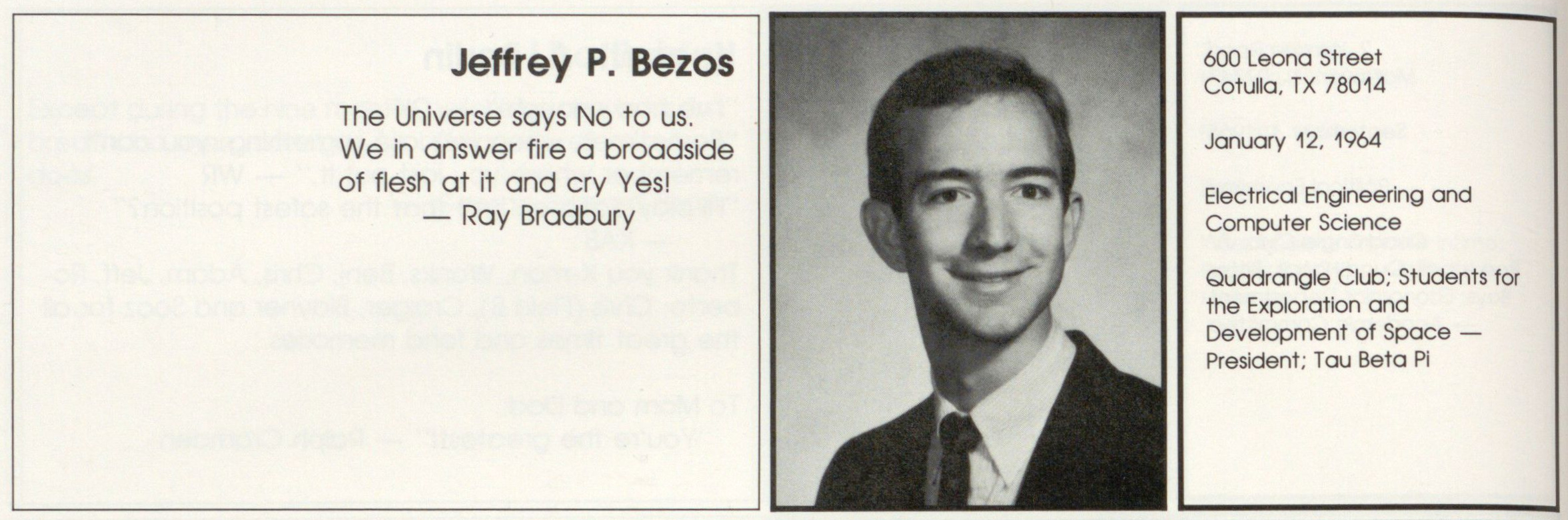
Bezos in the Princeton University yearbook, 1986

After graduating from high school in 1982, Bezos attended Princeton University. He initially majored in physics but later switched to electrical engineering and computer science. In 2018, during a talk at the Economic Club of Washington, D.C., Bezos revealed that, some thirty years ago, his Princeton classmate Yasantha Rajakarunanayake had defeated him in solving a mathematical problem, causing him to give up on his dreams of becoming a theoretical physicist.

Bezos was a member of the Quadrangle Club, one of Princeton's 11 eating clubs. Additionally, he was the president of the Princeton chapter of the Students for the Exploration and Development of Space (SEDS). He had a 4.2 GPA and was elected to Phi Beta Kappa and Tau Beta Pi. Bezos graduated from Princeton in 1986 with a Bachelor of Science in Engineering (BSE), summa cum laude.

== Business career ==
=== Early career ===
After Bezos graduated from college in 1986, he was offered positions at Intel, Bell Labs, and Andersen Consulting, among others. He first worked at Fitel, a financial technology telecommunications start-up, where he was tasked with building a network for international trade. Bezos was promoted to head of development and director of customer service. He transitioned into the banking industry when he became a product manager at Bankers Trust from 1988 to 1990. From 1990 to 1994, he worked at D. E. Shaw & Co, a newly created hedge fund with a strong emphasis on mathematical modeling. Bezos became D. E. Shaw's fourth senior vice president by age 30.

=== Amazon ===
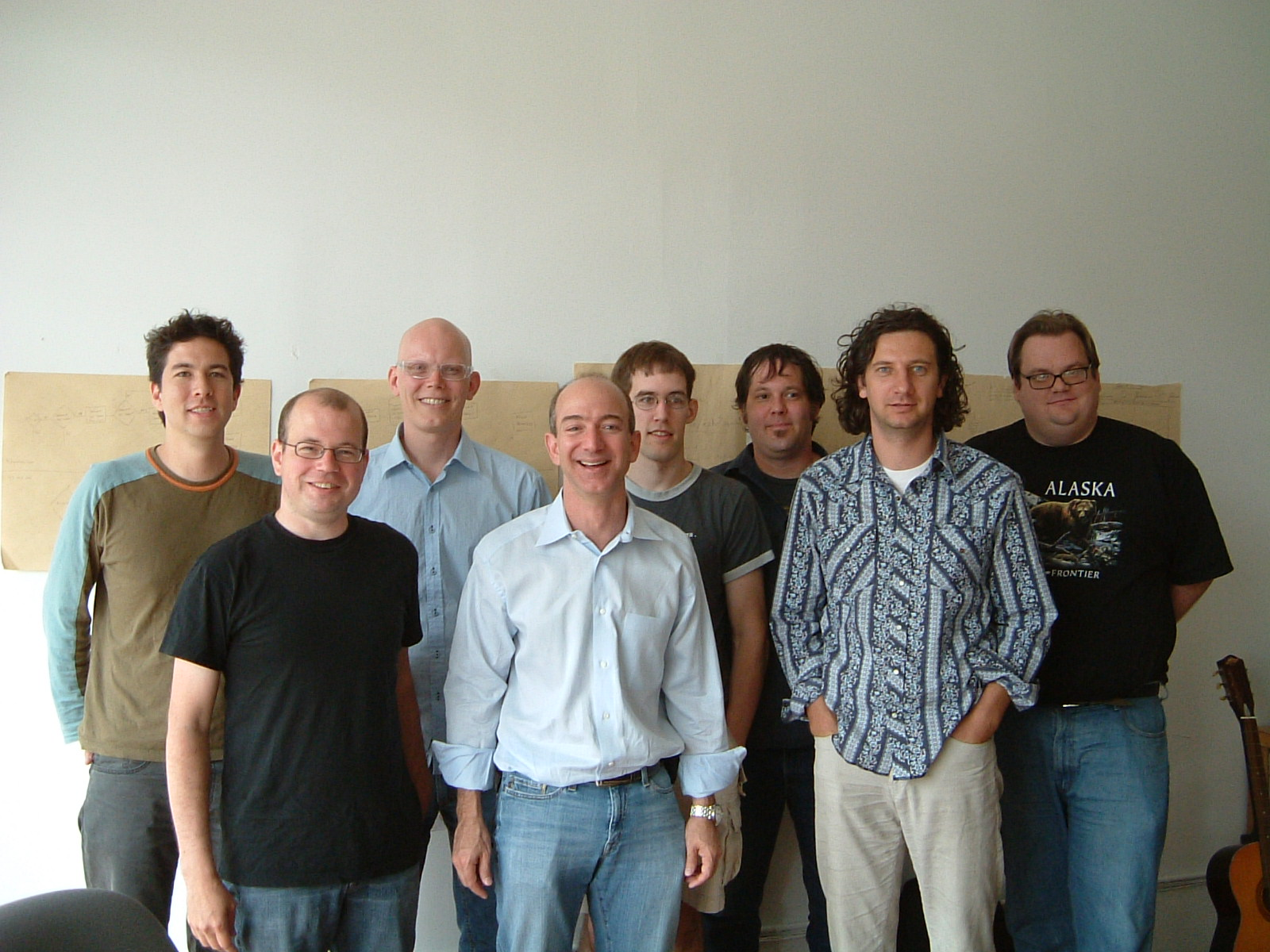
Bezos (front row, center) at the Robot Co-op in 2005

In spring 1994, Bezos read that web usage was growing at a rate of 2,300% a year and eventually decided to establish an online bookstore. He and his then-wife, MacKenzie Scott, left their jobs at D. E. Shaw and founded Amazon in a rented garage in Bellevue, Washington on July 5, 1994, after writing its business plan on a cross-country drive from New York City to Seattle. Bezos led the company's early development while MacKenzie Scott handled bookkeeping, financial administration, and some of Amazon's early freight negotiations during its startup phase. Before choosing Seattle as Amazon's headquarters, Bezos reportedly explored locating the company on a Native American reservation near San Francisco, partly because of potential tax advantages.

Bezos initially named his new company Cadabra but later changed the name to Amazon after the Amazon River in South America, in part because the name begins with the letter A, which is at the beginning of the alphabet. At the time, website listings were alphabetized, so a name starting with "A" would appear sooner when customers conducted online searches. In addition, he regarded "Amazon," the name of the world's largest river, as fitting for what he hoped would become the world's largest online bookstore. He accepted an estimated $300,000 (equivalent to $700,000 in 2025) from his parents as an investment in Amazon. He warned many early investors that there was a 70% chance that Amazon would fail or go bankrupt. Although Amazon was originally an online bookstore, Bezos had always planned to expand to other products. Three years after Bezos founded Amazon, he took it public with an initial public offering (IPO). In response to critical reports from Fortune and Barron's, Bezos maintained that the growth of the internet would overtake competition from larger book retailers such as Borders and Barnes & Noble.

In 1998, Bezos diversified into the online sale of music and video, and by the end of the year he had expanded the company's product offerings to include a variety of other consumer goods. Bezos used funds raised during the company's 1997 equity offering (equivalent to $110,000,000 in 2025) to finance the acquisition of smaller internet companies during the dot-com expansion period. Among these acquisitions were a purchase of a majority stake in Pets.com in 1999 and a purchase of a portion of Kozmo.com for $60 million (equivalent to $120,000,000 in 2025), both of which failed after the dot-com bubble collapse in 2000. By the end of 2000, Bezos borrowed $2 billion from banks (equivalent to $3.7×10^{9} in 2025), as Amazon's cash balances dipped to only $350 million (equivalent to $650,000,000 in 2025). However, the company continued to expand despite its losses, and in 2002, Bezos led Amazon to launch Amazon Web Services, which compiled data from weather channels and website traffic. Revenues stagnated later that year, and after the company nearly went bankrupt, Bezos closed distribution centers and laid off 14% of the Amazon workforce. In 2003, Amazon rebounded from financial instability and turned a profit of $35 million (equivalent to $61,000,000 in 2025).

In November 2007, Bezos launched the Amazon Kindle. According to a 2008 Time profile, Bezos wished to create a device that allowed a "flow state" in reading similar to the experience of video games. In 2013, Bezos secured a $600-million contract (equivalent to $830,000,000 in 2025) with the Central Intelligence Agency (CIA) on behalf of Amazon Web Services. In October of that year, Amazon was recognized as the largest online shopping retailer in the world.

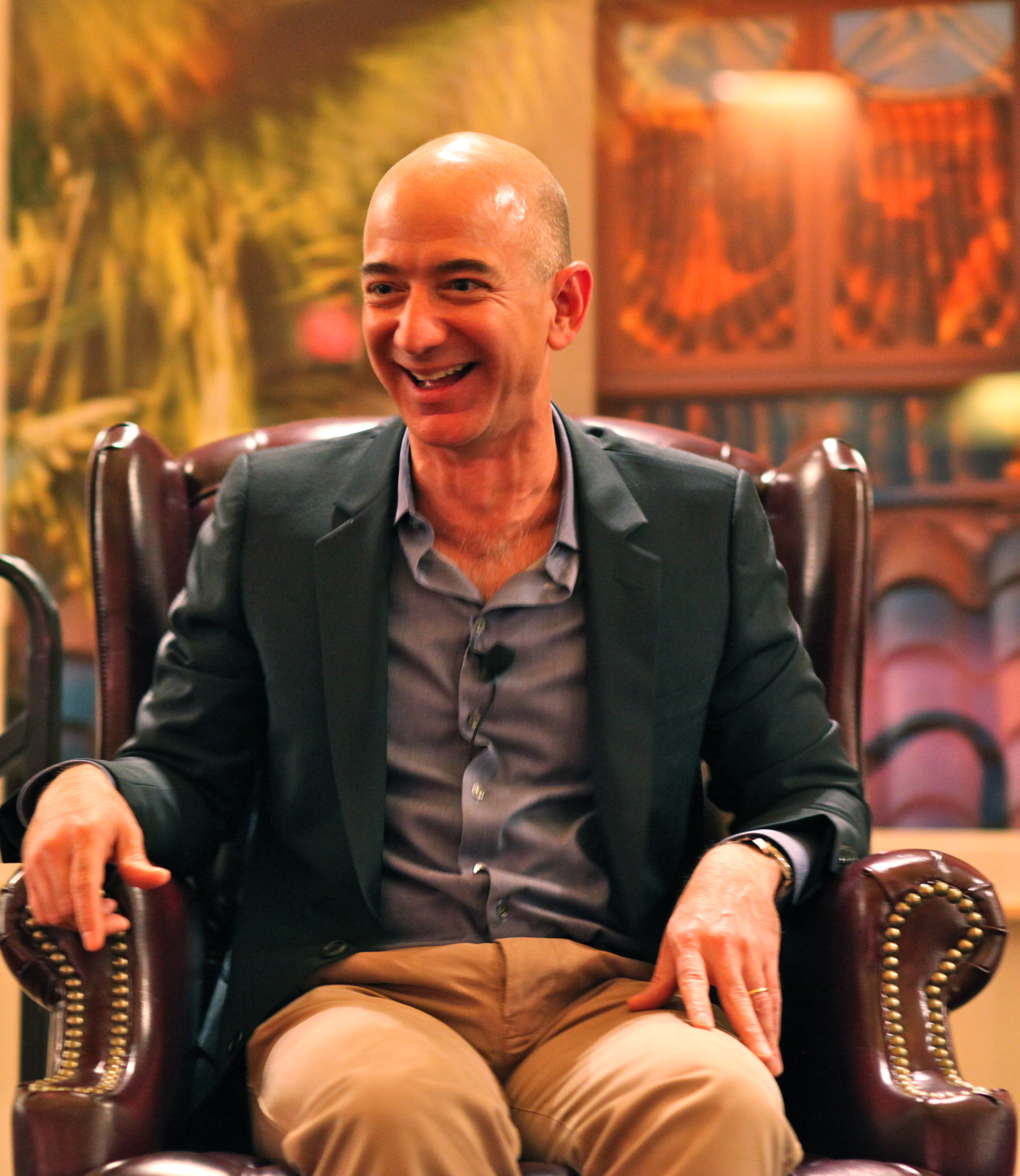
Bezos in 2010

In May 2016, Bezos sold slightly more than one million shares of his holdings in the company for $671 million (equivalent to $900,000,000 in 2025), the largest sum he had ever raised from selling some of his Amazon stock. On August 4, 2016, Bezos sold another million of his shares for $756 million (equivalent to $1.0×10^{9} in 2025). A year later, Bezos took on 130,000 new employees when he ramped up hiring at company distribution centers. By January 19, 2018, his Amazon stock holdings had appreciated to slightly over $109 billion (equivalent to $1.40×10^{11} in 2025); months later he began to sell stock to raise cash for other enterprises, in particular, Blue Origin. On January 29, 2018, he was featured in Amazon's Super Bowl commercial. On February 1, 2018, Amazon reported its highest ever profit with quarterly earnings of $2 billion (equivalent to $2.6×10^{9} in 2025). Due to the growth of Alibaba in China, Bezos has often expressed interest in expanding Amazon into India. On July 27, 2017, Bezos momentarily became the world's wealthiest person over Microsoft co-founder Bill Gates when his estimated net worth increased to just over $90 billion (equivalent to $1.18×10^{11} in 2025). His wealth surpassed $100 billion for the first time on November 24, 2017 (equivalent to $1.31×10^{11} in 2025), and he was formally designated the wealthiest person in the world by Forbes on March 6, 2018, with a net worth of $112 billion (equivalent to $1.44×10^{11} in 2025).

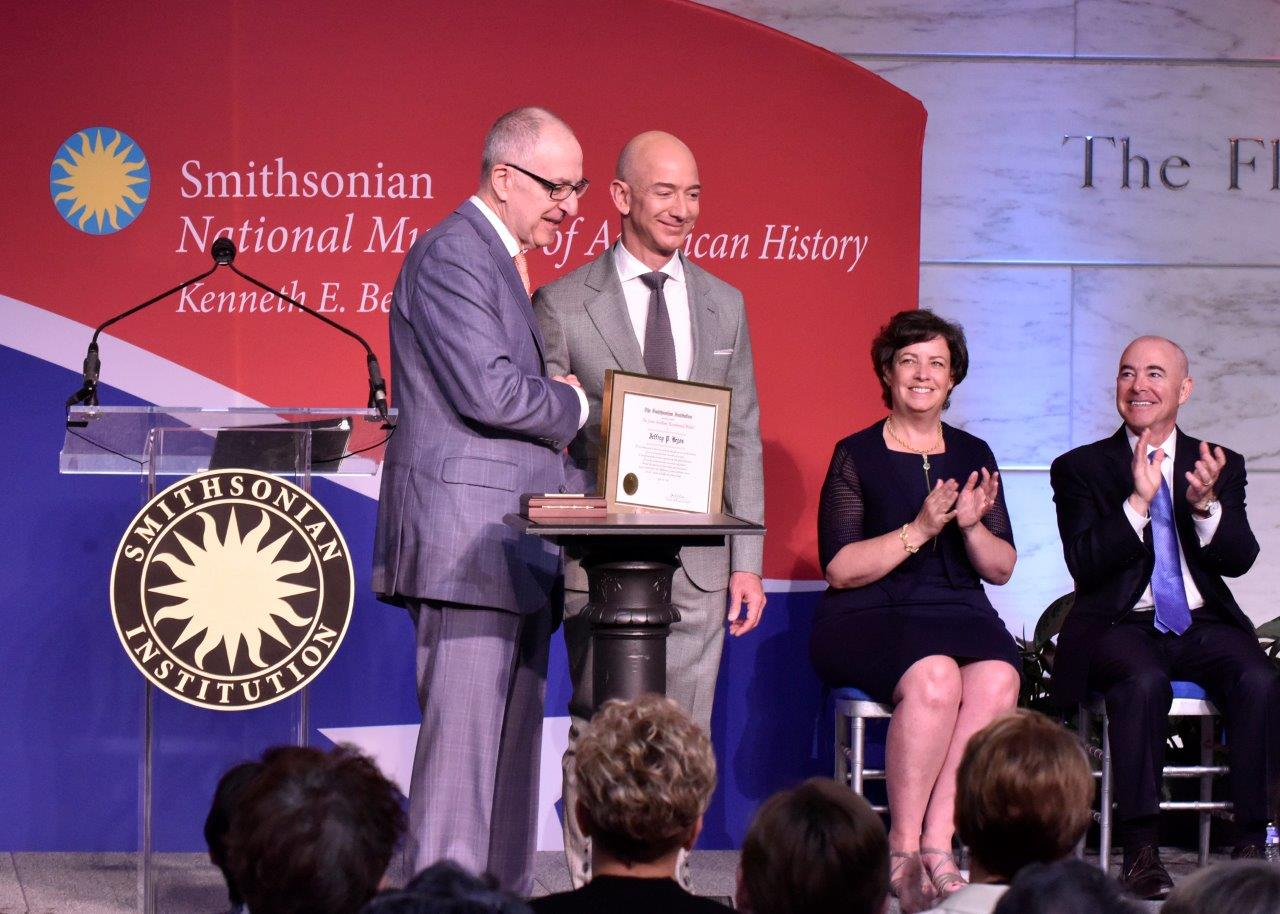
Bezos receives the James Smithson Bicentennial medal on June 14, 2016, for his work with Amazon.

In March 2018, Bezos dispatched Amit Agarwal, Amazon's global senior vice president, to India with $5.5 billion (equivalent to $7.1×10^{9} in 2025) to localize operations throughout the company's supply chain routes. Later in the month, U.S. President Donald Trump accused Amazon and Bezos, specifically, of sales tax avoidance, misusing postal routes, and anti-competitive business practices. Amazon's share price fell by 9% in response to the President's negative comments; this reduced Bezos's personal wealth by $10.7 billion (equivalent to $1.37×10^{10} in 2025). Weeks later, Bezos recouped his losses when academic reports out of Stanford University indicated that Trump could do little to regulate Amazon in any meaningful way. During July 2018, a number of members of the U.S. Congress called on Bezos to detail the applications of Amazon's face recognition software, Rekognition.

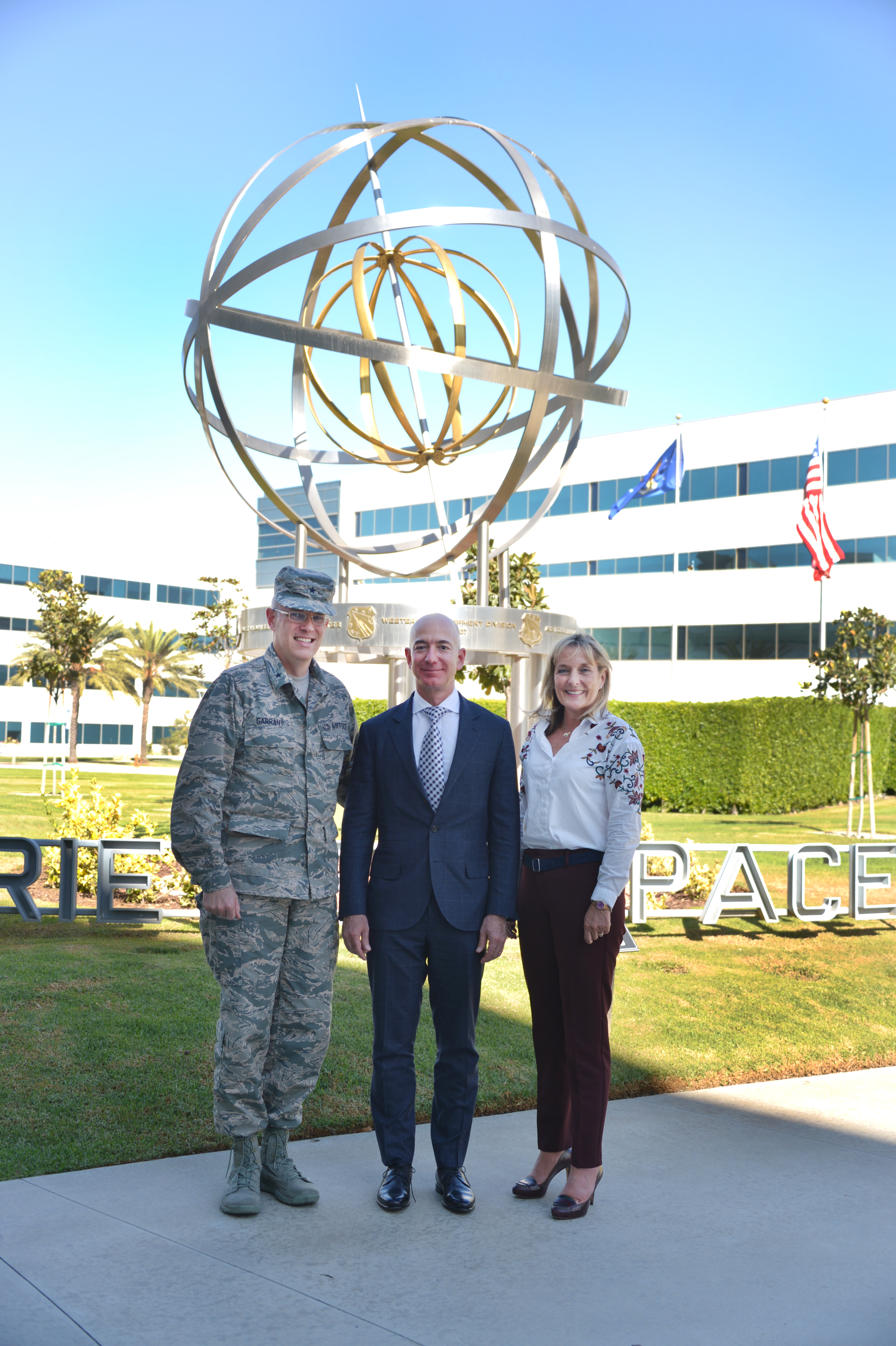
Bezos on October 25, 2017, on his visit to Los Angeles Air Force Base

Criticism of Amazon's business practices continued in September 2018 when Senator Bernie Sanders introduced the Stop Bad Employers by Zeroing Out Subsidies (Stop BEZOS) Act and accused Amazon of receiving corporate welfare. This followed revelations by the non-profit group New Food Economy which found that one third of Amazon workers in Arizona, and one tenth of Amazon workers in Pennsylvania and Ohio, relied on food stamps. While preparing to introduce the bill, Sanders opined: "Instead of attempting to explore Mars or go to the moon, how about Jeff Bezos pays his workers a living wage?" He later said: "Bezos could play a profound role. If he said today, nobody who is employed at Amazon will receive less than a living wage, it would send a message to every corporation in America." Sanders's efforts elicited a response from Amazon which pointed to the 130,000 jobs it created in 2017 and called the $28,446 figure (equivalent to $37,000 in 2025) for its median salary "misleading" as it included part-time workers. However, Sanders countered that the companies targeted by his proposal have placed an increased focus on part-time workers to escape benefit obligations. On October 2, 2018, Bezos announced a company-wide wage increase, which Sanders applauded. The American workers who were being paid the minimum wage had this increased to $15 per hour (equivalent to $19 in 2025), a decision that was interpreted as support for the Fight for $15 movement.

In February 2021, Bezos announced that in the third quarter of 2021 he would step down from his role as CEO of Amazon to become the Executive Chairman of the Amazon Board. He was succeeded as CEO by Andy Jassy. On February 2, 2021, Bezos sent an email to all Amazon employees, telling them the transition would give him "the time and energy [he] need[s] to focus on the Day 1 Fund, the Bezos Earth Fund, Blue Origin, The Washington Post, and [his] other passions." In February 2024, Bezos sold 24 million shares in Amazon at a total value of $4 billion. Bezos announced that he intended to sell 50 million shares in Amazon over the next year. During an interview at the DealBook Summit in December 2024, Bezos said that he was dedicating 95% of his time to artificial intelligence initiatives at Amazon.

=== Blue Origin ===
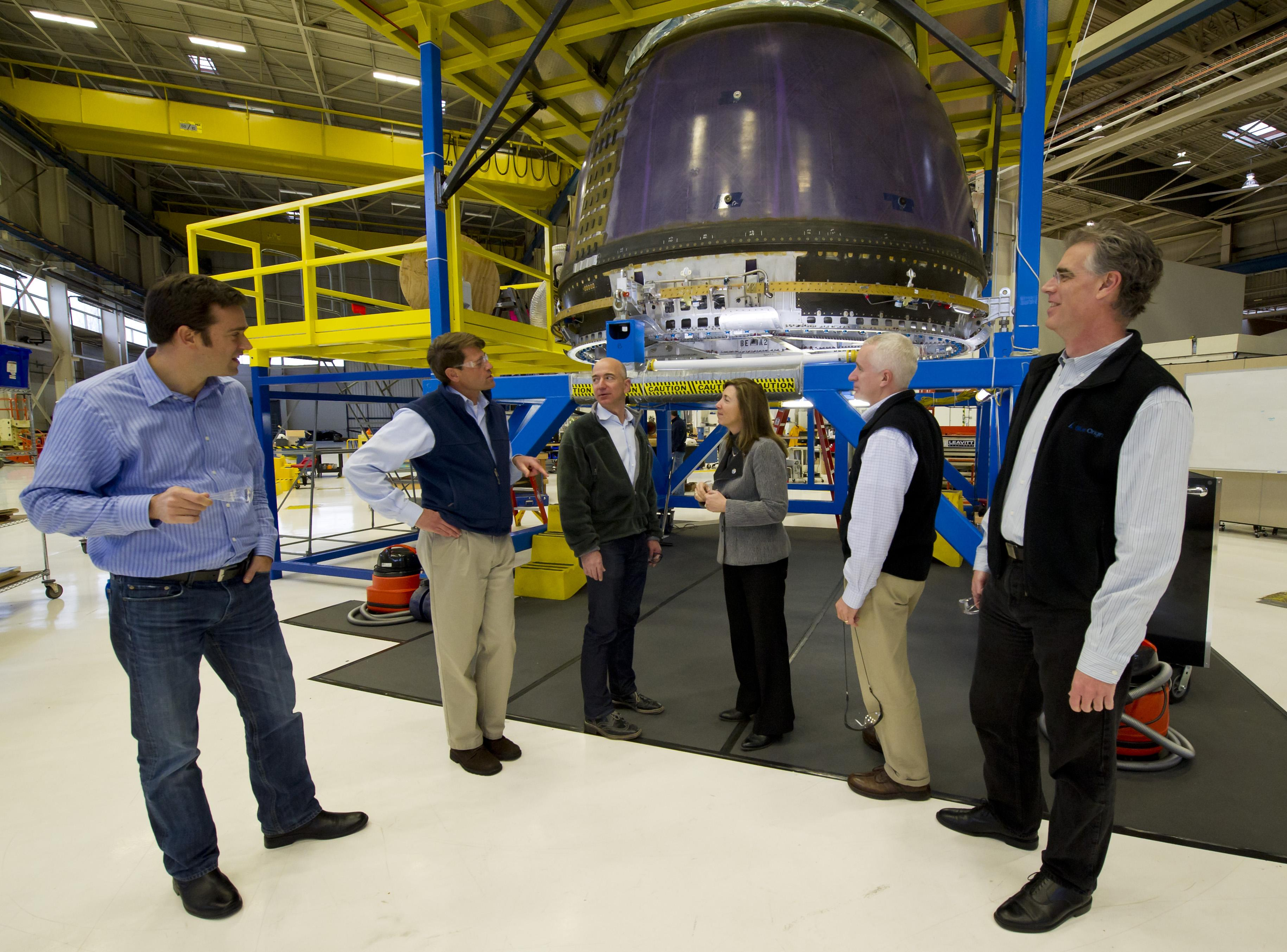
Bezos and Rob Meyerson (fifth from left) giving NASA Deputy Administrator Lori Garver (fourth from left) a tour of Blue Origin's crew capsule in 2011

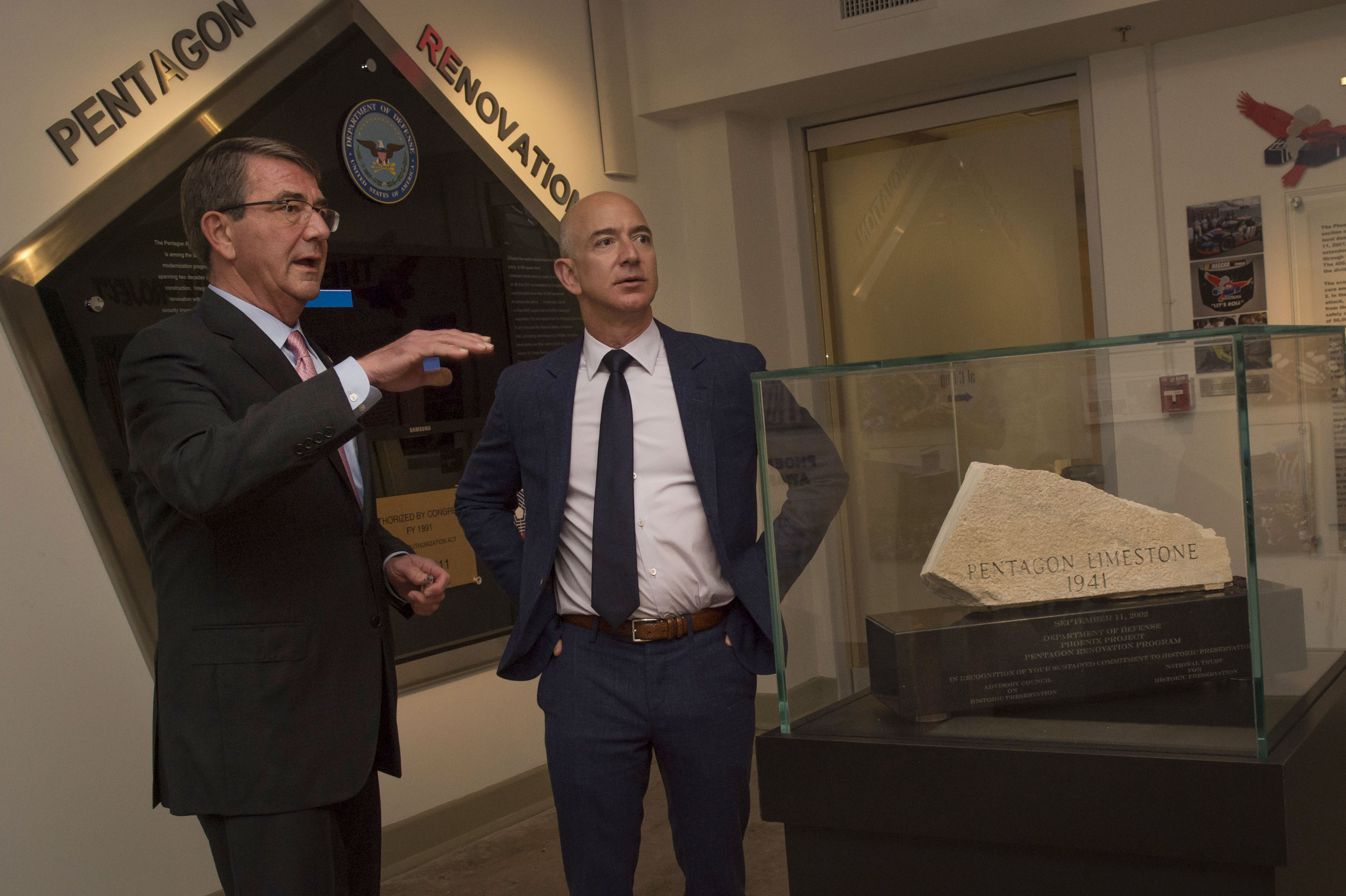
Then U.S. Secretary of Defense Ash Carter meets with Bezos in 2016 at The Pentagon.

In September 2000, Bezos founded Blue Origin, a human spaceflight startup. Bezos has long expressed an interest in space travel and the development of human life in the Solar System. His 1982 high school valedictorian senior graduation speech was followed up with a Miami Herald interview in which he expressed an interest to build and develop hotels, amusement parks, and colonies for human beings who were in orbit. The 18-year-old Bezos stated that he wanted to preserve Earth from overuse through resource depletion. Rob Meyerson led Blue Origin from 2003 to 2017 and served as its first president.

After its founding, Blue Origin maintained a low profile until 2006 when it purchased a large tract of land in West Texas for a launch and test facility. After the company gained the public's attention during the late 2000s, Bezos additionally indicated his interest in reducing the cost of space travel for humans while also increasing the safety of extraterrestrial travel. In September 2011, one of the company's uncrewed prototype vehicles crashed during a short-hop test flight. Although the crash was viewed as a setback, news outlets noted how far the company went from its founding-to-date in advancing spaceflight. After the crash, Bezos has been superstitiously wearing his "lucky" Texas Cowboy boots to all rocket launches. In May 2013, Bezos met with Richard Branson, chairman of Virgin Galactic, to discuss commercial spaceflight opportunities and strategies. He has been compared to Branson and Elon Musk as all three are billionaires who prioritize spaceflight among their business interests.

In 2015, Bezos announced that a new orbital launch vehicle was under development and would make its first flight in the late-2010s. Later in November, Blue Origin's New Shepard space vehicle successfully rocketed into space and reached its planned test altitude of 329,839 feet (100.5 kilometers) before executing a vertical landing back at the launch site in West Texas. In 2016, Bezos allowed select journalists to visit, tour, and photograph his facility. He has repeatedly called for increased inter-space energy and industrial manufacturing to decrease the negative costs associated with business-related pollution.

In December 2017, New Shepard successfully flew and landed dummy passengers, amending and pushing its human space travel start date into late 2018. To execute this program, Blue Origin built six of the vehicles to support all phases of testing and operations: no-passenger test flights, flights with test passengers, and commercial-passenger weekly operations. Since 2016, Bezos has spoken more freely about his hopes to colonize the solar system, and has been selling $1 billion in Amazon stock each year to capitalize Blue Origin in an effort to support this endeavor. In May 2018, Bezos maintained that the primary goal of Blue Origin is to preserve the natural resources of Earth by making the human species multi-planetary. He announced that New Shepard would begin transporting humans into sub-orbital space by November 2018. In July 2018, it was announced that Bezos had priced commercial spaceflight tickets from $200,000 to $300,000 per person.

==== Spaceflight ====
Jeff Bezos
- Space career

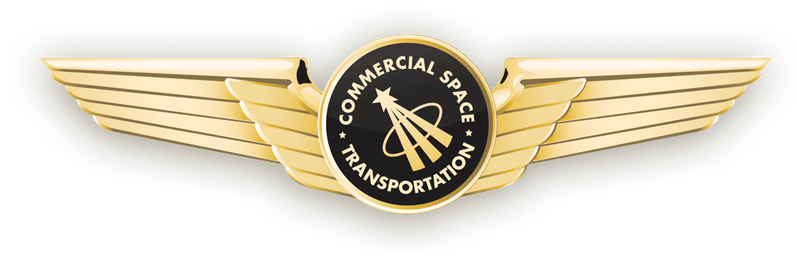
Commercial Astronaut
- Flight time: 10m 18s
- Selection: Blue Origin
- Missions: NS-16

On July 20, 2021, he launched on the NS-16 mission with his half-brother Mark Bezos, Wally Funk, and Oliver Daemen. He launched nine days after Richard Branson launched on board the Virgin Galactic Unity 22 mission. Bezos's suborbital flight lasted over 10 minutes, reaching a peak altitude of 66.5 miles (107.0 km).

=== The Washington Post ===
On August 5, 2013, Bezos announced his purchase of The Washington Post for $250 million in cash (equivalent to $350,000,000 in 2025), at the suggestion of his friend, Don Graham. To execute the purchase, he established limited liability company Nash Holdings to serve as a holding company through which he would own the newspaper. The sale closed on October 1, 2013, and Nash Holdings took control. In March 2014, Bezos made his first significant change at The Washington Post and lifted the online paywall for subscribers of a number of U.S. local newspapers in Texas, Hawaii, and Minnesota. In January 2016, Bezos set out to reinvent the newspaper as a media and technology company by rebuilding its digital media, mobile platforms, and analytics software. After a surge in online readership in 2016, the paper was profitable for the first time since Bezos made the purchase in 2013. Bezos' ownership of the Post has been subject to scrutiny and criticism regarding his treatment of employees as well as his influence on the paper's content, particularly his 2024–25 involvement with the editorial and opinion pages.

Throughout his early years of ownership of The Washington Post, Bezos was accused of having a potential conflict of interest with the paper. Bezos and the newspaper's editorial board have dismissed accusations that he unfairly controlled the paper's content, and Bezos maintains that the paper is independent. Bezos' treatment of employees at The Washington Post has also drawn scrutiny. In 2018, more than 400 Washington Post employees wrote an open letter to Bezos criticizing the wages and benefits provided to employees. The letter demanded "Fair wages; fair benefits for retirement, family leave and health care; and a fair amount of job security". About 750 employees at The Washington Post went on a brief strike in December 2023 in response to Bezos' plans to lay off staff.

In 2024, Bezos blocked the Washington Post's editorial board from endorsing Kamala Harris in the presidential election. The move was criticized by former editor Marty Baron, who considered it to be an act of "disturbing spinelessness at an institution famed for courage" and said that it would invite intimidation of Bezos by Donald Trump. Editor-at-large Robert Kagan and columnist Michele Norris also resigned in the wake of the decision, and editor David Maraniss said that the paper was "dying in darkness". Post opinion columnists jointly authored an article calling the decision to not endorse a "terrible mistake", and it was condemned by the Washington Post Guild, a union unit representing Post employees. More than 250,000 people (about ten percent of the Post's subscribers) cancelled their subscriptions, and three members of the editorial board left it.

In February 2025, Bezos announced that the opinion section of the Post will give voice to opinions that support "personal liberties" and "free markets". David Shipley, The Post's opinion editor, resigned after trying to persuade Bezos to reconsider the new direction. Within two days of the announcement, it was reported that over 75,000 digital subscribers had canceled their subscriptions.

Due to his considerable influence on industry, politics, and media, Bezos has been described as an oligarch.

=== Bezos Expeditions ===
Bezos makes personal investments through his venture capital vehicle, Bezos Expeditions. He was one of the first shareholders in Google, when he invested $250,000 in 1998 (equivalent to $490,000 in 2025). That $250,000 investment resulted in 3.3 million shares of Google stock, worth about $3.1 billion in 2017 (equivalent to $4.1×10^{9} in 2025). He also invested in Unity Biotechnology, a life-extension research firm hoping to slow or stop the process of aging. Bezos is involved in the healthcare sector, which includes investments in Unity Biotechnology, GRAIL, Juno Therapeutics, and Zocdoc. In January 2018, an announcement was made concerning Bezos's role within a new, unnamed healthcare company. This venture, later named Haven, is expected to be a partnership between Amazon, JPMorgan, and Berkshire Hathaway.

Bezos also supports philanthropic efforts through direct donations and non-profit projects funded by Bezos Expeditions. Bezos used Bezos Expeditions to fund several philanthropic projects, including an Innovation center at the Seattle Museum of History and Industry and the Bezos Center for Neural Circuit Dynamics at Princeton Neuroscience Institute. In 2013, Bezos Expeditions funded the recovery of two Saturn V first-stage Rocketdyne F-1 engines from the floor of the Atlantic Ocean. They were positively identified as belonging to the Apollo 11 mission's S-1C stage from July 1969. The engines are currently on display at the Seattle Museum of Flight.

In September 2021, Bezos invested in biotechnology research company Altos Labs.

=== Project Prometheus ===
In November 2025, Bezos announced that he co-founded Project Prometheus with former Google executive Vik Bajaj. The company will focus on the use of artificial intelligence in engineering and the manufacturing of computers, spacecraft, and automobiles.

== Public image ==
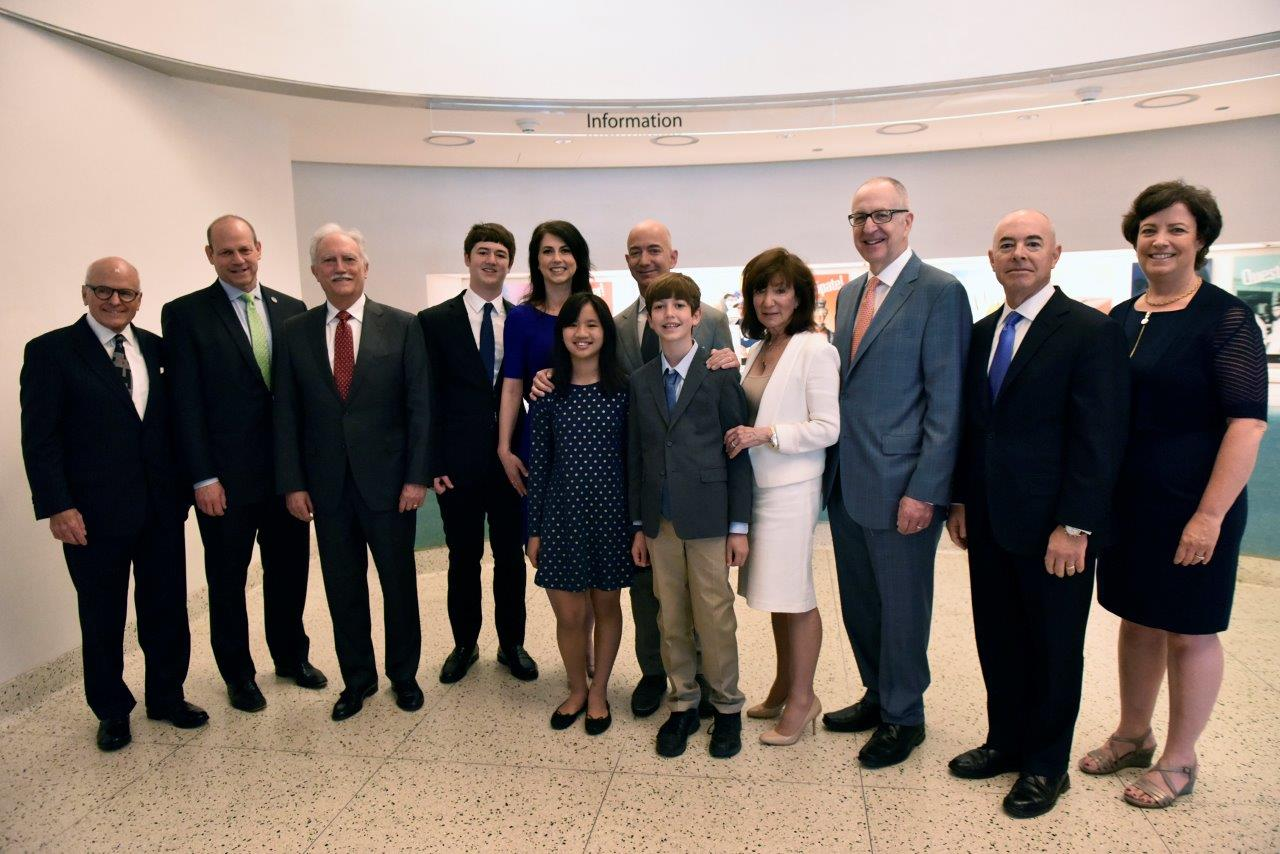
Bezos at a naturalization ceremony on June 14, 2016

Journalist Nellie Bowles of The New York Times has described the public persona and personality of Bezos as that of "a brilliant but mysterious and coldblooded corporate titan". During the 1990s, Bezos earned a reputation for relentlessly pushing Amazon forward, often at the expense of public charity and social welfare. Journalist Mark O'Connell criticized Bezos's relentless customer focus as "very small" in terms of impact on humanity as a whole, a sentiment technologist Tim O'Reilly agreed with. His business practices projected a public image of prudence and parsimony with his own wealth and that of Amazon. Throughout the early 2000s, he was perceived to be geeky or nerdy.

Bezos was seen by some as needlessly quantitative and data-driven. This perception was detailed by Alan Deutschman, who described him as "talking in lists" and "[enumerating] the criteria, in order of importance, for every decision he has made". Select accounts of his persona have drawn controversy and public attention. Notably, journalist Brad Stone wrote a book that described Bezos as a demanding boss as well as hyper-competitive, and opined that Bezos perhaps "bet the biggest on the Internet" out of anyone. Bezos has been characterized as a notoriously opportunistic CEO who operates with little concern for obstacles and externalities.

During the early 2010s, Bezos solidified his reputation for aggressive business practices, and his public image began to shift. Bezos started to wear tailored clothing; he weight trained, pursued a regimented diet and began to freely spend his money. His physical transformation has been compared to the transformation of Amazon; he is often referred to as the metonym of the company. Since 2017, he has been portrayed by Kyle Mooney and Steve Carell on Saturday Night Live, usually as an undercutting, domineering figure. His physical appearance increased the public's perception of him as a symbolically dominant figure in business and in popular culture, wherein he has been parodied as an enterprising supervillain.

In May 2014, the International Trade Union Confederation named Bezos the "World's Worst Boss", with its general secretary Sharan Burrow saying: "Jeff Bezos represents the inhumanity of employers who are promoting the North American corporate model", while in 2019, Harvard Business Review, which ranked Bezos the best-performing CEO for 4 years in a row since 2014, did not rank him even in the top 100, citing Amazon's "relatively low ESG (environment, social, and governance) scores" that reflect "risks created by working conditions and employment policies, data security, and antitrust issues".

During the late 2010s, Bezos reversed his reputation for being reluctant to spend money on non-business-related expenses. His relative lack of philanthropy compared to other billionaires has drawn a negative response from the public since 2016. Bezos has been known to publicly contest claims made in critical articles, as exemplified in 2015 when he sent a memo to employees denouncing a New York Times piece.

=== Leadership style ===
"Day 1" Management Philosophy

Day 1: start up
Day 2: stasis
Day 3: irrelevance
Day 4: "excruciating, painful decline"
Day 5: death

— Bezos has stated "it is always Day 1" to describe his growth mindset.

Bezos used what he called a "regret-minimization framework" while working at D. E. Shaw and again during the early years of Amazon. He described this life philosophy by stating: "When I'm 80, am I going to regret leaving Wall Street? No. Will I regret missing the beginning of the Internet? Yes." During the 1990s and early 2000s at Amazon, he was characterized as trying to quantify all aspects of running the company, often listing employees on spreadsheets and basing executive decisions on data. To push Amazon forward, Bezos developed the mantra "Get Big Fast", establishing the company's need to scale its operations to produce market dominance. He favored diverting Amazon profits back into the company in lieu of allocating it among shareholders in the form of dividends.

Bezos uses the term "work–life harmony" instead of the more standard "work–life balance" because he believes that balance implies that you can only have one and not the other. He believes that work and home life are interconnected, informing and calibrating each other. Journalist Walt Mossberg dubbed the idea that someone who cannot tolerate criticism or critique should not do anything new or interesting "The Bezos Principle". Bezos does not schedule early morning meetings and enforces a two-pizza rule—a preference that meetings are small enough for two pizzas to feed everyone in the boardroom. When interviewing candidates for jobs at Amazon, he has stated he considers three inquiries: can he admire the person, can the person raise the common standard, and under what circumstances could the person become exemplary.

In 2018, it was reported that he met with Amazon investors for just six hours a year. Instead of using presentation slides, Bezos requires employees to present information with six-page narratives. Since 1998, Bezos has published an annual letter for Amazon shareholders wherein he frequently refers to five principles: focus on customers, not competitors; take risks for market leadership; facilitate staff morale; build a company culture; and empower people. Bezos maintains the email address jeff@amazon.com as an outlet for customers to reach out to him and the company. Although he does not respond to the emails, he forwards some of them with a question mark in the subject line to executives, who then attempt to address the issues. Bezos has cited Jeff Immelt of New Enterprise Associates, Warren Buffett of Berkshire Hathaway, Jamie Dimon of JPMorgan Chase, and Bob Iger of The Walt Disney Company as major influences on his leadership style.

== Recognition ==
- In 1999, Bezos received his first major award when Time named him Person of the Year.
- In 2008, he was selected by U.S. News & World Report as one of America's best leaders.
- Bezos was awarded an honorary doctorate in science and technology from Carnegie Mellon University in 2008.
- In 2011, The Economist gave Bezos and Gregg Zehr an Innovation Award for the Amazon Kindle.
- In 2012, Bezos was named Businessperson of the Year by Fortune.
- He is also a member of the Bilderberg Group and attended the 2011 Bilderberg conference in St. Moritz, Switzerland, and the 2013 conference in Watford, Hertfordshire, England. He was a member of the executive committee of The Business Council for 2011 and 2012, and appointed as chairman of the organization in 2014.
- Between 2014 and 2018, he was ranked the best-performing CEO in the world by Harvard Business Review.
- He has also figured in Fortune's list of 50 great leaders of the world for three straight years, topping the list in 2015.
- In September 2016, Bezos received a $250,000 prize for winning the Heinlein Prize for Advances in Space Commercialization, which he donated to the Students for the Exploration and Development of Space.
- In February 2018, Bezos was elected to the National Academy of Engineering for "leadership and innovation in space exploration, autonomous systems, and building a commercial pathway for human space flight".
- In March 2018, at the Explorers Club annual dinner, he was awarded the Buzz Aldrin Space Exploration Award in recognition of his work with Blue Origin.
- He received Germany's 2018 Axel Springer Award for Business Innovation and Social Responsibility. Time magazine named him one of the 100 most influential people in the world on five separate occasions between 2008 and 2018.
- In 2019, Bezos was inducted into the Living Legends of Aviation, being awarded with the Jeff Bezos Freedom's Wings Award and the Kenn Ricci Lifetime Aviation Entrepreneur Award.
- In February 2023, Bezos was presented with the Légion d'honneur, the highest French order of merit. Bezos had been designated a member of the Légion d'Honneur about 10 years earlier but was not available to collect it.

== Wealth ==
Annual estimates of Jeff Bezos's net worth (Note: All currency figures expressed in the United States dollar (US$) in nominal terms)
Year	Billions	Change
1999	10.1	0.0%
2000	6.1	▼40.5%
2001	2.0	▼66.6%
2002	1.5	▼25.0%
2003	2.5	▲66.6%
2004	5.1	▲104%
2005	4.1	▼19.6%
2006	4.3	▲5.1%
2007	8.7	▲102.3%
2008	8.2	▼5.7%
2009	6.8	▼17.1%
2010	12.6	▲85.3%
2011	18.1	▲43.7%
2012	23.2	▲28.2%
2013	28.9	▲24.5%
2014	30.5	▲5.5%
2015	50.3	▲60.9%
2016	45.2	▼10.1%
2017	72.8	▲61.6%
2018	112.0	▲53.8%

Bezos first became a millionaire in 1997 after raising $54 million (equivalent to $110,000,000 in 2025) through Amazon's initial public offering (IPO). He was first included on the Forbes World's Billionaires list in 1999 with an estimated net worth of $10.1 billion (equivalent to $1.95×10^{10} in 2025), which placed his on the 19th position in the world and 10th in the USA. His net worth decreased to $6.1 billion a year later (equivalent to $1.14×10^{10} in 2025), a 40.5% drop. His wealth plummeted even more the following year, dropping 66.6% to $2.0 billion (equivalent to $3.6×10^{9} in 2025). He lost $500 million the following year (equivalent to $900,000,000 in 2025), which brought his net worth down to $1.5 billion (equivalent to $2.7×10^{9} in 2025). The following year, his net worth increased by 66.66% to $2.5 billion (equivalent to $4.4×10^{9} in 2025). From 2005 to 2007, he quadrupled his net worth to $8.7 billion (equivalent to $1.43×10^{10} in 2025). After the 2008 financial crisis and Great Recession, his net worth would decrease to $6.8 billion (equivalent to $1.02×10^{10} in 2025)—a 17.7% drop. His wealth rose by 85.2% in 2010, leaving him with $12.6 billion (equivalent to $1.86×10^{10} in 2025). This percentage increase ascended him to the 43rd spot on the ranking from 68th.

After a rumor broke out that Amazon was developing a smartphone, Bezos's net worth rose to $30.5 billion in 2014 (equivalent to $4.15×10^{10} in 2025). A year later, he entered the top ten when he increased his net worth to a total of $50.3 billion (equivalent to $6.83×10^{10} in 2025). Bezos rose to become the fifth richest person in the world hours before market close; he gained $7 billion in one hour (equivalent to $9.0×10^{9} in 2025). By the time the Forbes list was calculated in March 2016, his net worth was registered at $45.2 billion (equivalent to $6.06×10^{10} in 2025). However, just months later in October 2016, his wealth increased by $16.2 billion (equivalent to $2.17×10^{10} in 2025) to $66.5 billion (equivalent to $8.92×10^{10} in 2025), unofficially ranking him the third-richest person in the world, behind Warren Buffett. After sporadic jumps in Amazon's share price, in July 2017 he briefly unseated Microsoft co-founder Bill Gates as the wealthiest person in the world.

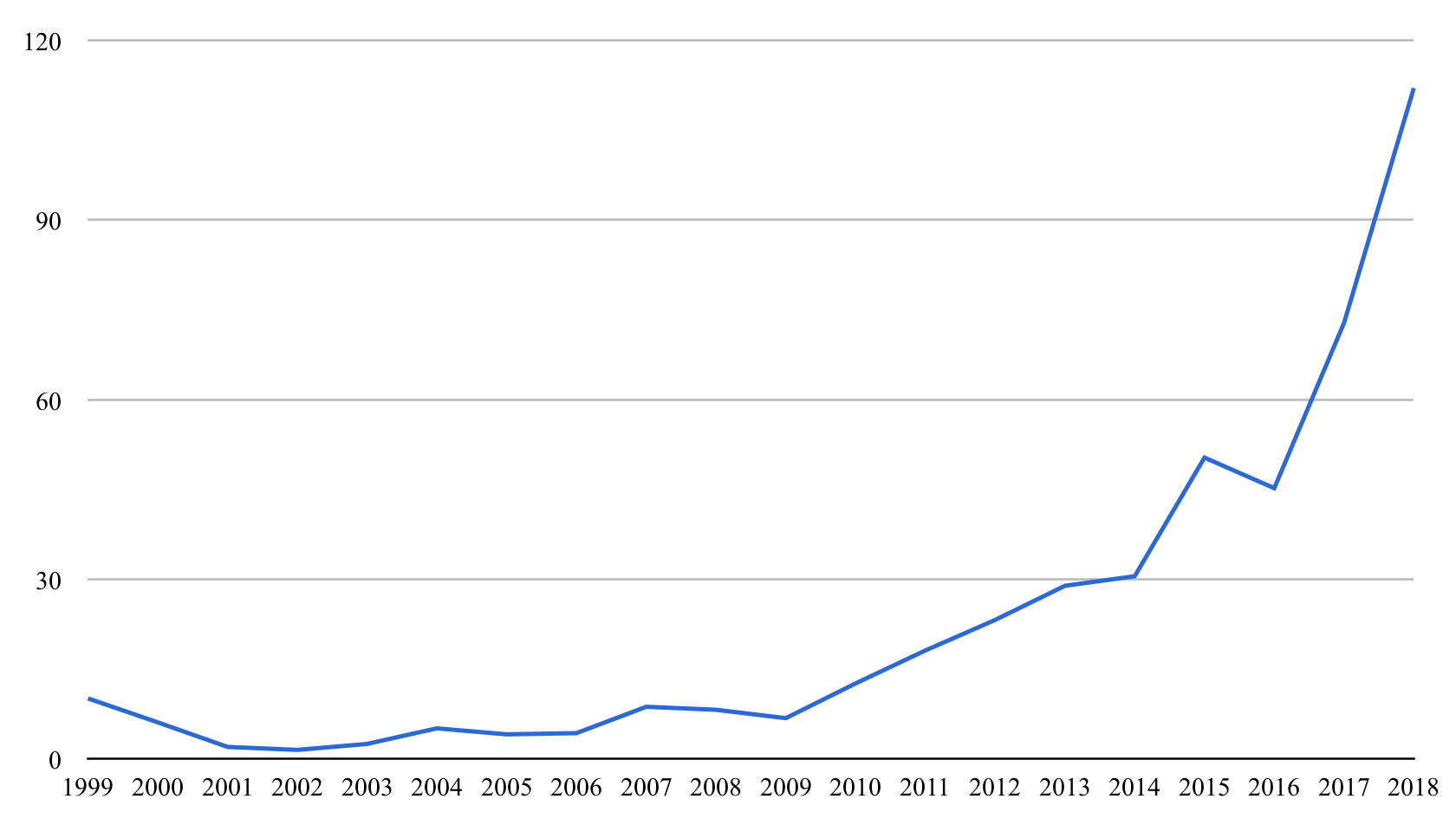
The net worth of Jeff Bezos from 1999 to 2018 as estimated by Forbes magazine, in the nominal U.S. dollar. His net worth is calculated in the billions by March of each year.

Bezos would continue to sporadically surpass Gates throughout the month of October 2017 after Amazon's share price fluctuated. His net worth surpassed $100 billion for the first time on November 24, 2017 (equivalent to $1.31×10^{11} in 2025), after Amazon's share price increased by more than 2.5%. When the 2017 list was issued, Bezos's net worth was registered at $72.8 billion (equivalent to $9.5620418137×10^{10} in 2025), adding $27.6 billion from the previous year (equivalent to $3.6×10^{10} in 2025). His wealth's rapid growth from 2016 to 2017 sparked a variety of assessments about how much money Bezos earned on a controlled, reduced time scale. On October 10, 2017, he made an estimated $6.24 billion (equivalent to $8.2×10^{9} in 2025) in 5 minutes, slightly less than the then annual gross domestic product of Kyrgyzstan.

On March 6, 2018, Bezos was designated the wealthiest person in the world, with a registered net worth of $112 billion (equivalent to $1.44×10^{11} in 2025). He unseated Bill Gates ($90 billion, equivalent to $1.15×10^{11} in 2025), who was $6 billion (equivalent to $7.7×10^{9} in 2025) ahead of Warren Buffett ($84 billion, equivalent to $1.08×10^{11} in 2025), ranked third. He is considered the first registered centi-billionaire (not adjusted for inflation). (Note: Although Bill Gates momentarily surpassed the $100 billion net worth mark in April 1999 before the Dot-com bubble, Bezos was the first to register $100 billion with major wealth indexes and has retained the wealth for longer than Gates's three weeks.)

Bezos's net worth increased by $33.6 billion (equivalent to $4.4×10^{10} in 2025) from January 2017 to January 2018. Following a report by Quartz highlighting Bezos' wealth, Amazon workers in Poland, Germany, and Spain participated in demonstrations and labor strikes draw attention to his growing wealth and the lack of compensation, labor rights, and satisfactory working conditions of select Amazon workers. On July 17, 2018, he was designated the "wealthiest person in modern history" (Note: Many calculations of Bezos's wealth during the late 2010s were not adjusted for inflation. When he was designated the "world wealthiest person" on March 6, 2018, the Forbes The World's Billionaires list stipulated that although Bezos was the first centi-billionaire (i.e. +US$100 billion in net worth), it was Bill Gates who had the most money when taken in real terms. In such terms, Gates had $150 billion while Bezos had $100 billion. However, in July 2018, the net worth of Bezos officially surpassed the $150 billion mark, which led most major wealth indexes to label him the wealthiest person in modern history (post-1982).) by the Bloomberg Billionaires Index, Fortune, MarketWatch, The Wall Street Journal, and Forbes.

In 2019, Bezos's wealth was reduced by the divorce from his wife MacKenzie Bezos. According to Forbes, had the Washington state common law applied to their divorce without a prenuptial agreement, Bezos's wealth could have been equitably divided with his ex-wife; however, she eventually received 25% of Bezos's Amazon shares, then valued at approximately $36 billion (equivalent to $4.5×10^{10} in 2025), making her the third-richest woman in the world. Bezos retained his interest in The Washington Post and Blue Origin, as well as voting control of the shares received by his ex-wife.

In June 2019, Bezos purchased three adjoining apartments overlooking Madison Square Park in Manhattan, including a penthouse, for a combined total of $80 million (equivalent to $101,000,000 in 2025), making this one of the most expensive real estate purchases within New York City in 2019. Bezos had also purchased three adjoining apartments at 25 Central Park West in Manhattan for $7.65 million in 1999 (equivalent to $14,800,000 in 2025); he bought a fourth unit in that building for $5.3 million in 2012 (equivalent to $7,400,000 in 2025).

In February 2020, Bezos purchased the Warner Estate from David Geffen for $165 million (equivalent to $205,000,000 in 2025), a record price paid for a residence in the Los Angeles area. During the COVID-19 pandemic, it was reported that Bezos's fortune had grown by $24 billion (equivalent to $2.99×10^{10} in 2025), citing a surge in demand from households on lockdown shopping on Amazon. He further expanded his residential holdings in February 2022, purchasing a $16.1 million apartment at a 24-story boutique condominium (equivalent to $17,700,000 in 2025), located across from Madison Square Park in the Flatiron neighborhood, where he already owns all the units on the top floor. Bezos is the owner of the Y721, a luxury superyacht estimated to cost more than $500,000,000 (equivalent to $550,000,000 in 2025); it is the largest yacht in the world. According to Forbes Bezos was the second-wealthiest person in America and the third-wealthiest person in the world in 2023.

Bezos added a remote 14-acre estate on La Perouse Bay in Maui, encircled by inactive lava fields, to his real estate holdings for $78 million in 2022 (equivalent to $90,000,000 in 2025).

As of May 2026, the Bloomberg Billionaires Index ranks Bezos the fourth wealthiest person in the world, with an estimated wealth of $279 billion.

== Personal life ==
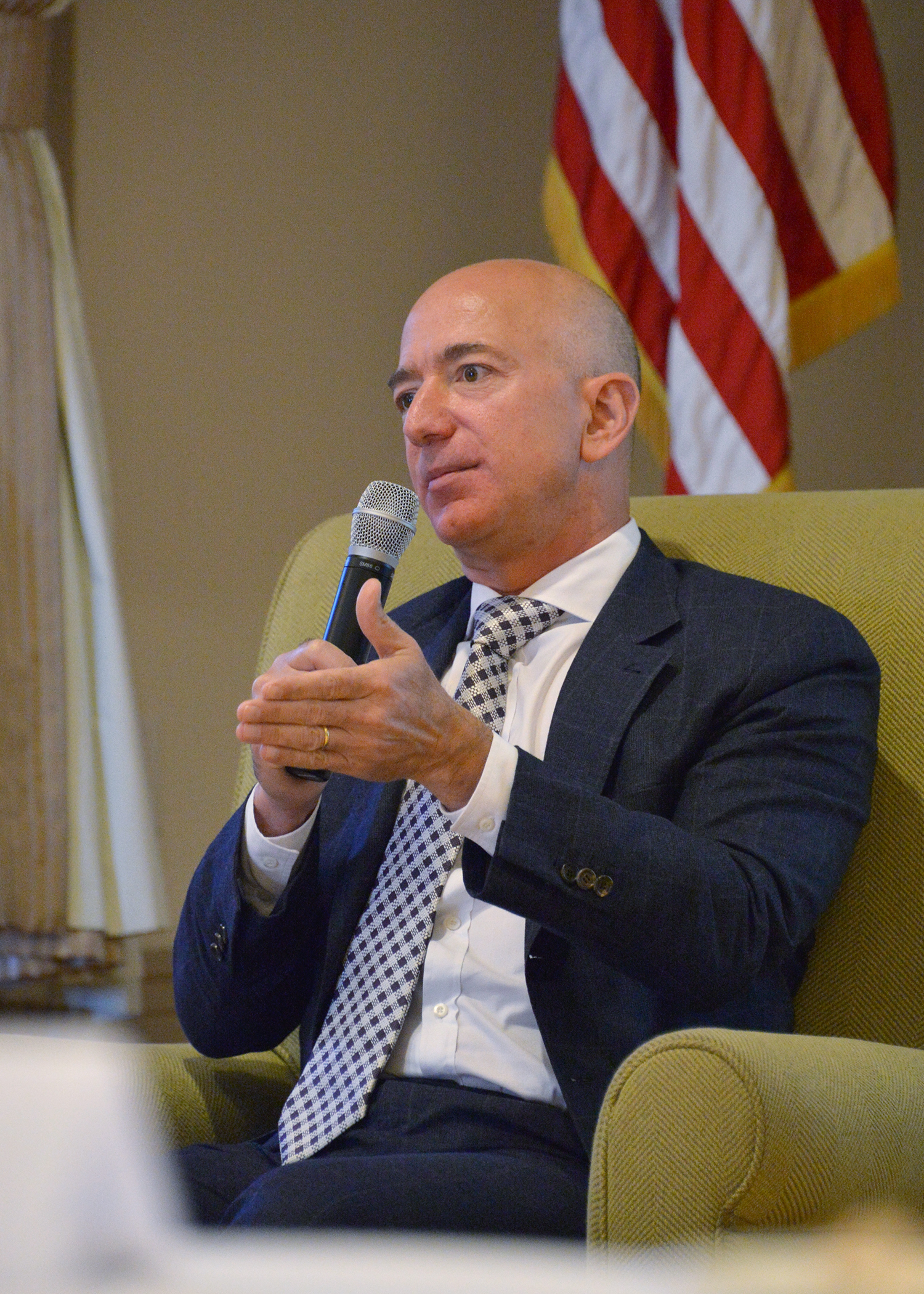
Bezos in 2017

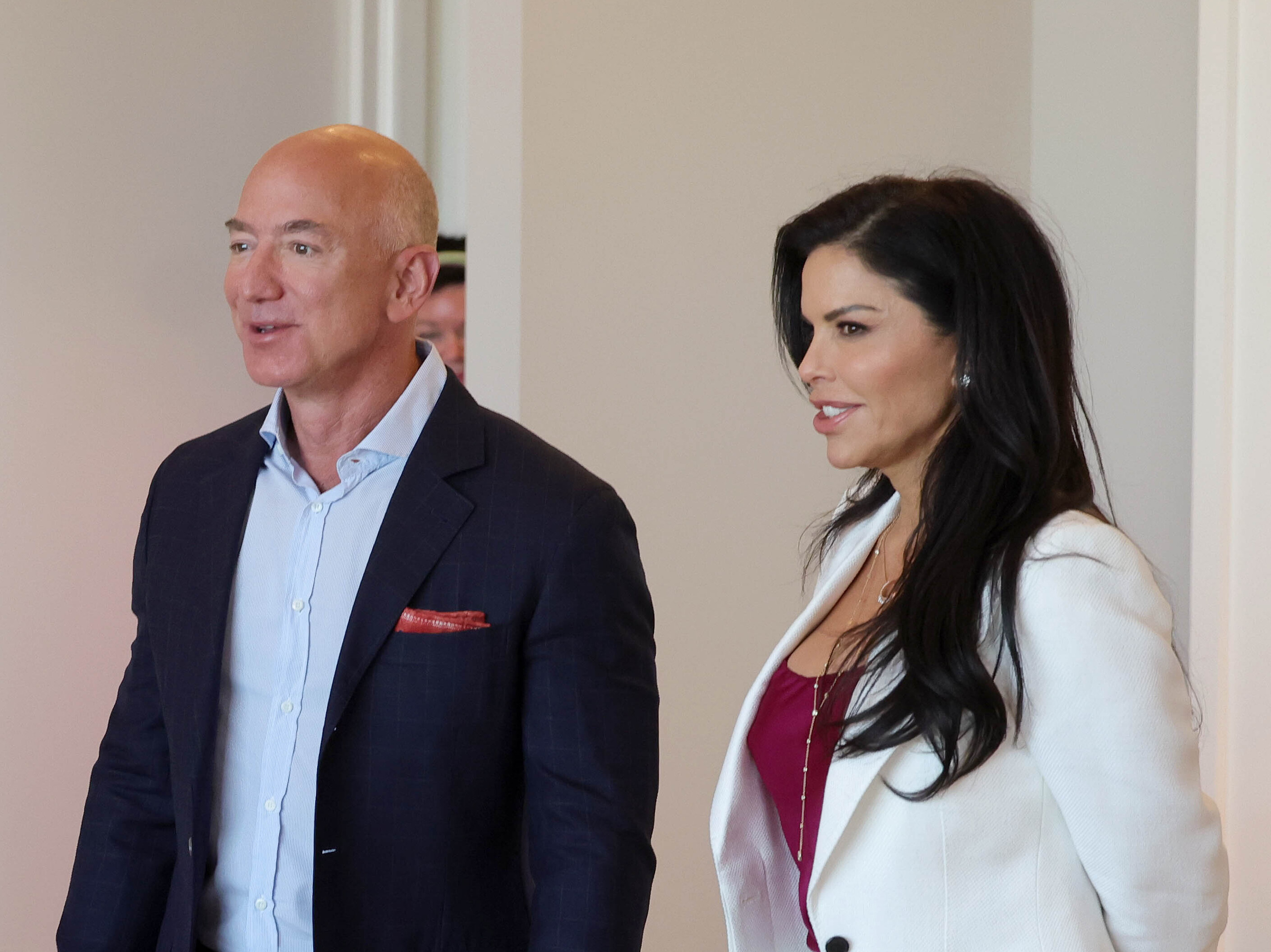
Bezos and Lauren Sánchez Bezos in September 2021

In 1992, while working for D. E. Shaw in Manhattan, Bezos met novelist MacKenzie Tuttle, who was a research associate at the firm; the couple married a year later. In 1994, they moved across the country to Seattle, Washington, where Bezos founded Amazon. Bezos and his ex-wife MacKenzie are the parents of four children: three sons, and a daughter adopted from China.

In March 2003, Bezos was a passenger in a helicopter that crashed in West Texas while surveying land to buy for Blue Origin; the other three occupants in the helicopter were pilot Charles "Cheater" Bella, Amazon lawyer Elizabeth Korrell, and local rancher Ty Holland. All survived; Bezos sustained only minor injuries and was discharged from a local hospital the same day.

Bezos portrayed a Starfleet official in the 2016 movie Star Trek Beyond, and joined the cast and crew at a San Diego Comic-Con screening. He had lobbied Paramount for the role apropos of Alexa and his personal/professional interest in speech recognition. His one line consisted of a response to an alien in distress: "Speak Normally." In his initial discussion of the project which became Alexa with his technical advisor Greg Hart in 2011, Bezos told him that the goal was to create "the Star Trek computer." Bezos's family corporation Zefram LLC is named after Zefram Cochrane, a character from Star Trek.

In January 2019, Bezos and his wife MacKenzie released a joint statement which revealed that they would be getting divorced after 25 years together. Subsequently, National Enquirer revealed that Bezos had an affair with media personality Lauren Sánchez; the affair with Sánchez had lasted for months. Later, Bezos published an online essay on February 7, 2019, in which he accused American Media, Inc. owner David Pecker of "extortion and blackmail" for threatening to publish intimate photos of Bezos and current girlfriend Lauren Sánchez if he did not stop his investigation into how his text messages and other photos had been leaked to the National Enquirer. Media reports have accused Sánchez's brother Michael of being the source for the photos obtained by National Enquirer; however, Bezos has speculated that it may have been the Saudi Arabian government.

On April 4, 2019, the divorce was finalized, with Bezos keeping 75% of the couple's Amazon stock and MacKenzie getting the remaining 25% ($35.6 billion, equivalent to $4.48×10^{10} in 2025). However, Bezos would keep all of the couple's voting rights. Sánchez and Bezos became engaged in May 2023. The couple married in Venice on June 27, 2025, with the ceremony attracting mainstream media attention and various celebrities.

Bezos is the Honorary Chair of the Explorers Club.

Bezos is a member of an investment consortium that purchased a minority stake in Liverpool F.C. in August 2026.

== Politics ==
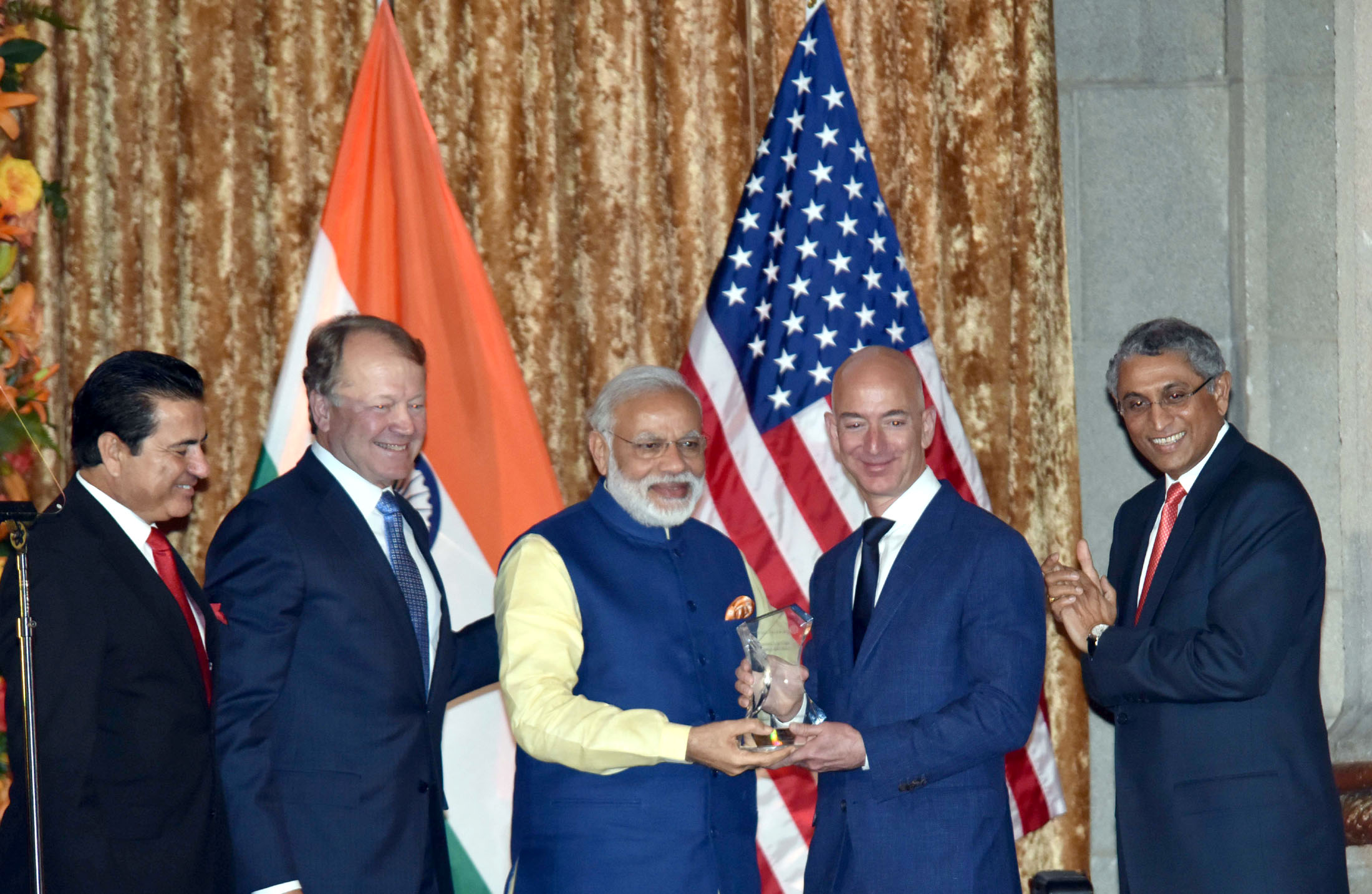
Indian prime minister Narendra Modi presenting the USIBC Global Leadership Award to Bezos, in Washington, D.C. on June 7, 2016

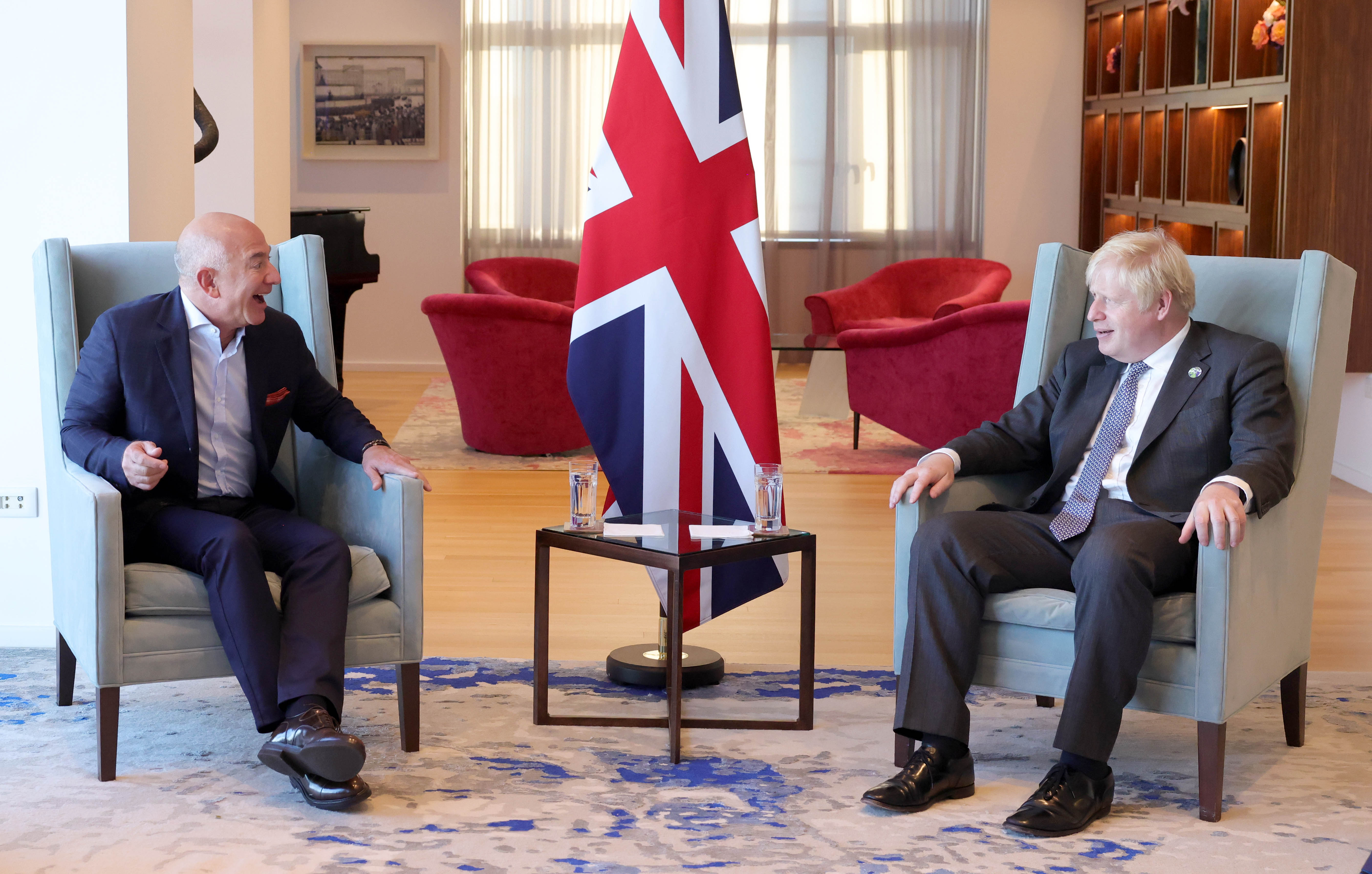
British prime minister Boris Johnson meets with Bezos during the United Nations General Assembly, in New York City on September 20, 2021.

According to public campaign finance records, Bezos supported the electoral campaigns of Patty Murray and Maria Cantwell, two Democratic U.S. senators from Washington. He has also supported Democrats U.S. representative John Conyers, as well as Patrick Leahy and Republican Spencer Abraham, U.S. senators serving on committees dealing with Internet-related issues. Jeff Bezos and MacKenzie Bezos have supported the legalization of same-sex marriage, and in 2012 contributed $2.5 million (equivalent to $3,500,000 in 2025) to Washington United for Marriage, a group supporting a yes vote on Washington Referendum 74, which affirmed a same-sex marriage law enacted in the state. Bezos donated $100,000 (equivalent to $150,000 in 2025) towards a movement against a Washington state income tax in 2010 for "top earners". In 2012, he donated to Amazon's political action committee (PAC), which has given $56,000 (equivalent to $79,000 in 2025) and $74,500 (equivalent to $104,000 in 2025) to Democrats and Republicans, respectively.

In 2014, Amazon won a bid for a cloud computing contract with the CIA valued at $600 million (equivalent to $800,000,000 in 2025). A 2018, $10 billion contract (equivalent to $1.28×10^{10} in 2025) known as the Joint Enterprise Defense Infrastructure (JEDI) project, this time with the Pentagon, was allegedly written up in a way that favors Amazon. Controversy over this was raised when General James Mattis accepted a headquarters tour invitation from Bezos and coordinated the deal through Sally Donnelly, a lobbyist who previously worked for Amazon. In November 2019, when the contract was awarded to Microsoft instead, Amazon filed a lawsuit with allegations that the bidding process was biased. On July 6, 2021, the Pentagon cancelled the JEDI contract with Microsoft, citing that "due to evolving requirements, increased cloud conversancy, and industry advances, the JEDI Cloud contract no longer meets its needs." Despite Bezos's support for an open borders policy towards immigrants, Amazon has actively marketed facial recognition software to U.S. Immigration and Customs Enforcement (ICE).

In 2019, a PAC linked to Bezos spent over $1 million (equivalent to $1,300,000 in 2025) in an unsuccessful attempt to defeat the reelection bid of Seattle city council member and activist Kshama Sawant. On November 22, 2021, Jeff Bezos donated $100 million (equivalent to $119,000,000 in 2025) to the Obama Foundation to "help expand the scope of programming that reaches emerging leaders" and requested the Obama Presidential Center's plaza to be named after John Lewis.

=== Donald Trump ===
After the 2016 presidential election, Bezos was invited to join Donald Trump's Defense Innovation Advisory Board, an advisory council to improve the technology used by the Defense Department. Trump has repeatedly criticized Bezos via Twitter, accused Bezos of avoiding corporate taxes, gaining undue political influence, and undermining his presidency by spreading fake news. Nevertheless, Bezos congratulated Trump on his second election victory, posting on X, "Big congratulations to our 45th and now 47th President on an extraordinary political comeback and decisive victory. No nation has bigger opportunities. Wishing Donald Trump all success in leading and uniting the America we all love."

Since 2023, Bezos has been a resident of Indian Creek, Florida. As reported by Axios in February 2025, Bezos held a private phone conversation in July 2024 with then-candidate Trump, planting the seeds of a "Bezos–Trump alliance" months before Bezos blocked the Washington Post's editorial board from endorsing Kamala Harris in the election. After Trump's November victory, Bezos dined with Elon Musk and Trump at Mar-a-Lago; Amazon subsequently donated $1 million to Trump's inauguration, at which Bezos was in attendance. Bezos and Trump were reported to have met for dinner again in February 2025, on the same night that Bezos announced changes to the Washington Post's opinion policies to promote "free markets and personal liberties" and suppress divergent opinions. Axios characterized it as "another sign of Trump and Bezos' growing closeness".

According to the Financial Times, Bezos had a contentious relationship with Trump during Trump's first term, but worked to have a positive relationship with Trump in 2024 and during Trump's second term. Bezos reportedly supported Trump to further his business interests, and supports many of Trump's policies. The Financial Times also noted that Bezos had made other changes in his life, including stepping down as CEO of Amazon in 2021, focusing on Blue Origin, and being engaged to Lauren Sánchez, which may have changed his political views.

=== Saudi hacking claim ===
In March 2018, Bezos met in Seattle with Mohammad bin Salman, the crown prince and de facto ruler of Saudi Arabia, to discuss investment opportunities for Saudi Vision 2030. In March 2019, Bezos's security consultant accused the Saudi government of hacking Bezos's phone. According to BBC, Bezos's top security staffer, Gavin de Becker, "linked the hack to the Washington Post's coverage of the murder of Saudi writer Jamal Khashoggi at the Saudi consulate in Istanbul". Khashoggi, a Saudi journalist and dissident, was employed as a writer at the Washington Post, owned by Bezos. Khashoggi was killed in late 2018 in Turkey's Saudi consulate for his critical stance and journalism against the Saudi government and its leader. In January 2020, The Guardian reported that the hack was initiated before the murder but after Khashoggi wrote critically about the crown prince in the Washington Post. Forensic analysis of Bezos's mobile phone conducted by advisory firm FTI Consulting, concluded it "highly probable" that the hack was achieved using a malicious file hidden in a video sent in a WhatsApp message to Bezos from the personal account of the crown prince on May 1, 2018. Saudi Arabia has denied the claim.

== Philanthropy ==
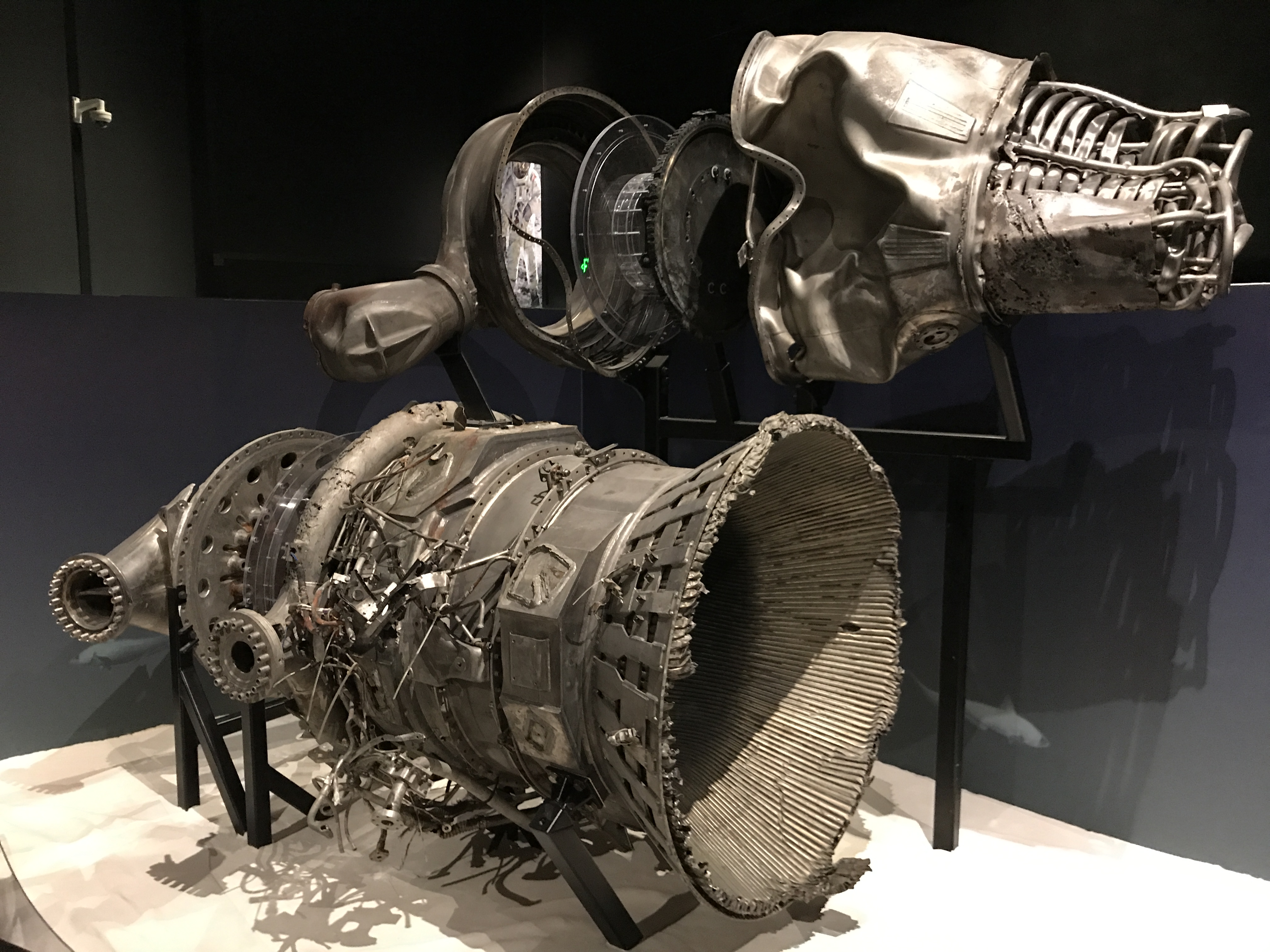
Bezos funded the retrieval of these F-1 engine parts from the bottom of the Atlantic Ocean in 2015, eventually donating them to the Seattle Museum of Flight. They are from Apollo 16 (above) and Apollo 12 (below).

Bezos donated to the Fred Hutchinson Cancer Research Center several times between 2009 and 2017. In 2013, he pledged $500,000 (equivalent to $700,000 in 2025) to Worldreader, a non-profit founded by a former Amazon employee. In September 2018, Business Insider reported that Bezos was the only one of the top five billionaires in the world who had not signed the Giving Pledge, an initiative created by Bill Gates and Warren Buffett that encourages wealthy people to give away a majority of their wealth. That same month, Janet Camarena, director of transparency initiatives at Foundation Center, was quoted by CNBC as having questions about Bezos's new Day 1 Fund, including the fund's structure and how exactly it will be funded.

In May 2017, Bezos gave $1 million (equivalent to $1,300,000 in 2025) to the Reporters Committee for Freedom of the Press, which provides pro bono legal services for American journalists. On June 15, 2017, he posted a message on Twitter asking for ideas for philanthropy: "I'm thinking about a philanthropy strategy that is the opposite of how I mostly spend my time—working on the long term". At the time of the post, Bezos's lifetime spending on charitable causes was estimated to be $100 million (equivalent to $130,000,000 in 2025). Multiple opinion columnists responded by asking Bezos to pay higher wages to Amazon warehouse workers. A year later in June, he tweeted that he would announce two philanthropic foci by the end of summer 2018. Bezos announced in September 2018 that he would commit approximately $2 billion (equivalent to $2.6×10^{9} in 2025) to a fund to deal with American homelessness and establish a network of non-profit preschools for low-income communities. As part of this announcement, he committed to establishing the "Day 1 Families Fund" to finance "night shelters and day care centers for homeless families" and the "Day 1 Academies Fund" for early childhood education.

In January 2018, Bezos made a $33 million donation (equivalent to $42,000,000 in 2025) to TheDream.US, a college scholarship fund for undocumented immigrants brought to the United States as minors. In June 2018, Bezos donated to Breakthrough Energy Ventures, a private philanthropic fund founded by Bill Gates aimed at promoting emissions-free energy. In September 2018, Bezos donated $10 million (equivalent to $13,000,000 in 2025) to With Honor, a nonpartisan organization that works to increase the number of veterans in political office.

In February 2020, Bezos pledged $10 billion (equivalent to $1.24×10^{10} in 2025) to combat climate change through the Bezos Earth Fund. Later that year, in November, Bezos announced $791 million (equivalent to $980,000,000 in 2025) of donations to established, well-known groups, with $100 million (equivalent to $120,000,000 in 2025) each going to Environmental Defense Fund, Natural Resources Defense Council, The Nature Conservancy, World Resources Institute and World Wildlife Fund, and the remainder going to 11 other groups. In April 2020, early in the COVID-19 pandemic, Bezos donated $100 million (equivalent to $120,000,000 in 2025) to food banks through Feeding America. In November 2021, Bezos pledged to donate $2 billion (equivalent to $2.4×10^{9} in 2025) towards restructuring food systems and nature conservation at the 2021 United Nations Climate Change Conference. The Earth Fund supported the Earth Rover Program, which aims to develop high-yield low-environmental-impact farming by novel seismological study of soils, with $4m.

In July 2021, Bezos announced the Courage and Civility Award and donated $100 million (equivalent to $120,000,000 in 2025) each to lawyer Van Jones and chef José Andrés. The next year, he donated $100 million (equivalent to $110,000,000 in 2025) to singer Dolly Parton in recognition of her charity work focused on improving children's literacy around the world. In March 2024, he donated $50 million (equivalent to $55,000,000 in 2025) each to actress Eva Longoria and retired admiral Bill McRaven.

Bezos Academy is a group of tuition-free preschools for students from low-income families, which was created by Bezos, and which operate in a manner similar to the Montessori method (but are not accredited as Montessori schools). On November 22, 2022, Bezos awarded $123 million (equivalent to $140,000,000 in 2025) to organizations that are engaged in relocating homeless families to permanent housing. Day 1 Families Fund grants, the amounts of which vary in monetary terms, will be sent to 40 organizations across the country.

== See also ==
- List of Princeton University alumni
- List of richest Americans in history

== Sources ==
- Robinson, Tom (2010). Jeff Bezos: Amazon.com Architect. ABDO Publishing. ISBN 978-1-60453-759-8.

Honorary titles
Preceded by Bill Gates	World's richest person 2018–2021	Succeeded by Elon Musk
