= Yasantha Rajakarunanayake =

American-Sri Lankan mathematician, technologist, researcher and data scientist

- Born: Colombo District, Sri Lanka
- Education: St Peter's College, Colombo, Royal College, Colombo, Sri Lanka
- Alma mater: Princeton University (BS); California Institute of Technology (PhD)
- Occupations: mathematician, physicist, technologist, professor, researcher and data scientist
- Children: 2
- Scientific career
- Fields: Electronic Engineering
- Institutions: MediaTek

Yasantha Rajakarunanayake is a Sri Lankan–American physicist, computer scientist, researcher, professor, and data scientist. He is best known for befriending future Amazon CEO Jeff Bezos, a classmate at Princeton University. He received social media fame and attention for having assisted Bezos on a homework assignment by solving a mathematical problem.

== Biography ==
Yasantha grew up in Ratmalana, Colombo. His mother, Ethel Rajakarunanayake, served as a school teacher at St. Mary's College in Dehiwala. His father, Hilary Rajakarunanayake, served as an accountant in the Middle East. His father also spent a short stint working at Daily News as its Deputy Editor before his retirement. He attended the Royal College in Colombo and excelled in his academic studies. Notably, he was a batch topper at his school and he managed to receive the highest marks in the GCE Advanced Level Examination in the Combined Mathematics stream by obtaining satisfactory results of 4A's. Yasantha suffered from asthma since childhood. His father advised him to find a well maintained air conditioned office so as to not have to breathe dusty air while working. He took his father's advice seriously and focused on making a career in IT.

== Career ==
Yasantha initially pursued his higher education at the University of Moratuwa in the field of electronic engineering. He eventually received a scholarship offer to attend Princeton University and left Sri Lanka in 1982 to pursue his remaining undergraduate education at Princeton. At this time, he coincidentally met Bezos, who later went on to found Amazon.com. Bezos called him the "smartest guy at Princeton". On 13 September 2018, during a talk at The Economic Club of Washington, D.C., Bezos heaped praise on Yasantha.

Bezos, during the talk, related that Yasantha had easily solved a mathematical problem that Bezos and his roommate could not solve. This led Bezos to give up on becoming a theoretical physicist. Bezos and Yasantha, though, did not maintain a close connection after they left Princeton. Soon after Bezos had mentioned Yasantha's name in the September talk, people apparently went to search about him in the internet and several of them even sent emails and text messages to reach out to Yasantha, who revealed that most of the mail messages from anonymous persons repeatedly asked whether "Are you Jeff Bezos' Yoshanta’?" He confirmed that he received spam emails in his LinkedIn inbox, as he initially had doubts and suspicions about whether someone had hacked his email.

After he completed his undergraduate studies as an Electrical Engineering and Computer Science major in 1985, he obtained his PhD in the field of Applied Physics at California Institute of Technology. He worked for few years as a university professor in Physics and established his reputation with over 50 technical publications before switching his career trajectory into internet technology in 1995 after becoming aware of the potential of Broadband internet. He worked as a senior technologist and scientist with experience spanning three decades. As of August 2019, he reportedly had 94 US patent applications for his inventions which also included pending applications prior to approval. He created several innovative applications and artificial intelligence algorithm designs for human presence and gesture detection with mmWave radar systems. He developed and designed systems algorithms that could leverage AI in novel MedTech and medical imaging applications. He successfully implemented and improved techniques and methodologies that could improvise and enhance medical diagnosis.
