= Earth Rover Program =

Agricultural research project

The Earth Rover Program measures soil properties that are difficult to measure by other methods. The program was funded with US$4m from the Bezos Earth Fund. It uses novel techniques of seismology.

Attempts to measure soil typically require labour-intensive digging—estimating the volume of soil in a field requires hundreds of core samples—and destroys the soil structure under study. Measuring compaction or porosity is more difficult. The lack of information on soil has impeded the development of farming that combines high yields with low environmental impact—existing techniques reduce yield, so that more land is required to be farmed, which increases total impact. Initial costs have been high, although more cost effective techniques are possible. For example, as of 2022 sensors cost $10,000 each. The project found that a $100 geophone was just as effective. In 2025 the project was developing a sensor that cost about $10, with the possibility of using the accelerometers in all mobile telephones, at zero cost.

Farmer Iain Tolhurst had developed methods of increasing yield combined with low environmental impact, without chemical fertilizer, animal manure, or pesticides. His techniques appear to support relationships between crops and soil microbes through which soil nutrients must pass. Soil bacteria then released nutrients when his crops required them (mineralisation), and protected them when crops are not growing (immobilisation) so that they do not leach from the soil. However, not all farmers who adopted Tolhurst's methods succeeded; possibly due to lack of knowledge of soil properties.

Farming technology is not based on precise knowledge of the soil, so that many inputs such as fertilisers, irrigation, and deep ploughing are wasted. About two-thirds of nitrogen fertiliser and 50% to 80% of phosphorus is not taken up, instead causing algal blooms in rivers, dead zones at sea, and waste of irrigation water. For example, if soil is incorrectly thought to be compacted, farmers resort to deep (and damaging) ploughing.
