= Bisha (disambiguation) =

Bisha could refer to one of the following:

A place, location, or structure:

- Bisha – a city in Saudi Arabia
  - Bisha University
  - Wadi Bisha – a wadi beside the city of Bisha in Saudi Arabia
- Bishia (also called Bisha) – a small locality and the terminus of the Eritrean Railway
- Bisha Mine – a zinc-copper mine near Bishia in Eritrea

A ceremony:

- Bisha'a – trial by fire, a ritualistic form of lie detection among the Bedouin peoples

An organisation:

- British inline Skater Hockey Association

== See also ==
- Bisa (disambiguation)
