= Hockey =

Sports played with hockey sticks

Hockey is a family of stick sports where two opposing teams use hockey sticks to propel a ball or disk into a goal. There are many types of hockey, and the individual sports vary in rules, numbers of players, apparel, and playing surface. Hockey includes both summer and winter variations that may be played on an outdoor field, sheet of ice, or an indoor gymnasium. Some forms of hockey require skates, either inline, roller or ice, while others do not. The various games are usually distinguished by proceeding the word hockey with a qualifier, as in field hockey, ice hockey, roller hockey, rink hockey, or floor hockey.

In each of these sports, two teams play against each other by trying to manoeuvre the object of play, either a type of ball or a disk (such as a puck), into the opponent's goal using a hockey stick. Two notable exceptions use a straight stick and an open disk (still referred to as a puck) with a hole in the center instead. The first case is a style of floor hockey whose rules were codified in 1936 during the Great Depression by Canada's Sam Jacks. The second case involves a variant which was later modified in roughly the 1970s to make a related game that would be considered suitable for inclusion as a team sport in the newly emerging Special Olympics. The floor game of gym ringette, though related to floor hockey, is not a true variant because it was designed in the 1990s and modelled on the Canadian ice skating team sport of ringette, which was invented in Canada in 1963. Ringette was also invented by Sam Jacks, the same Canadian who codified the rules for the open disk style of floor hockey in 1936.

Certain 'stick sports' which share general characteristics with the forms of hockey but are not generally referred to as hockey include sports that evolved outside the 'family' of hockey sports; these include the various versions of lacrosse developed from sports played by Native Americans and First Nations, and the Gaelic sports of hurling, camogie (in Ireland), and shinty (in Scotland).

== Etymology ==
The first recorded use of the word hockey is in the 1773 book Juvenile Sports and Pastimes, to Which Are Prefixed, Memoirs of the Author: Including a New Mode of Infant Education by Richard Johnson (pseud. Master Michel Angelo), whose chapter XI was titled "New Improvements on the Game of Hockey". The belief that hockey was mentioned in a 1363 proclamation by King Edward III of England is based on modern translations of the proclamation, which was originally in Latin and explicitly forbade the games "Pilam Manualem, Pedivam, & Bacularem: & ad Canibucam & Gallorum Pugnam". The English historian and biographer John Strype did not use the word "hockey" when he translated the proclamation in 1720, instead translating "canibucam" as "cambuck"; this may have referred to either an early form of hockey or a game more similar to golf or croquet. The word hockey itself is of unknown origin. One supposition is that it is a derivative of hoquet, a Middle French word for a shepherd's stave. The curved, or "hooked" ends of the sticks used for hockey would indeed have resembled these staves, and similar folk etymologies exist for the bat-and-ball sports of croquet and cricket. Another supposition derives from the known use of cork bungs (stoppers), in place of wooden balls to play the game. The stoppers came from barrels containing "hock" ale, also called "hocky".

=== Modern usage ===
In most of the world, the term hockey when used without clarification refers to field hockey, while in Canada, the United States, Russia and most of Eastern and Northern Europe, the term usually refers to ice hockey. In more recent history, the word "hockey" is used in reference to either the summer Olympic sport of field hockey, which is a stick-and-ball game, and the winter ice team skating sports of bandy and ice hockey. This is because field hockey and other stick-and-ball sports and their related variants preceded games which would eventually be played on ice with ice skates, namely bandy and ice hockey, as well as sports involving dry floors such as roller hockey and floor hockey. However, the "hockey" referred to in common parlance often depends on locale, geography, and the size and popularity of the sport involved. For example, in Europe, "hockey" more typically refers to field hockey, whereas in Canada, it typically refers to ice hockey. In the case of bandy, the game was initially called "hockey on the ice" and preceded the organization and development of ice hockey, but was officially changed to "bandy" in the early 20th century to avoid confusion with ice hockey, a separate sport. Bandy, while related to other hockey games, derives some of its inspiration from association football.

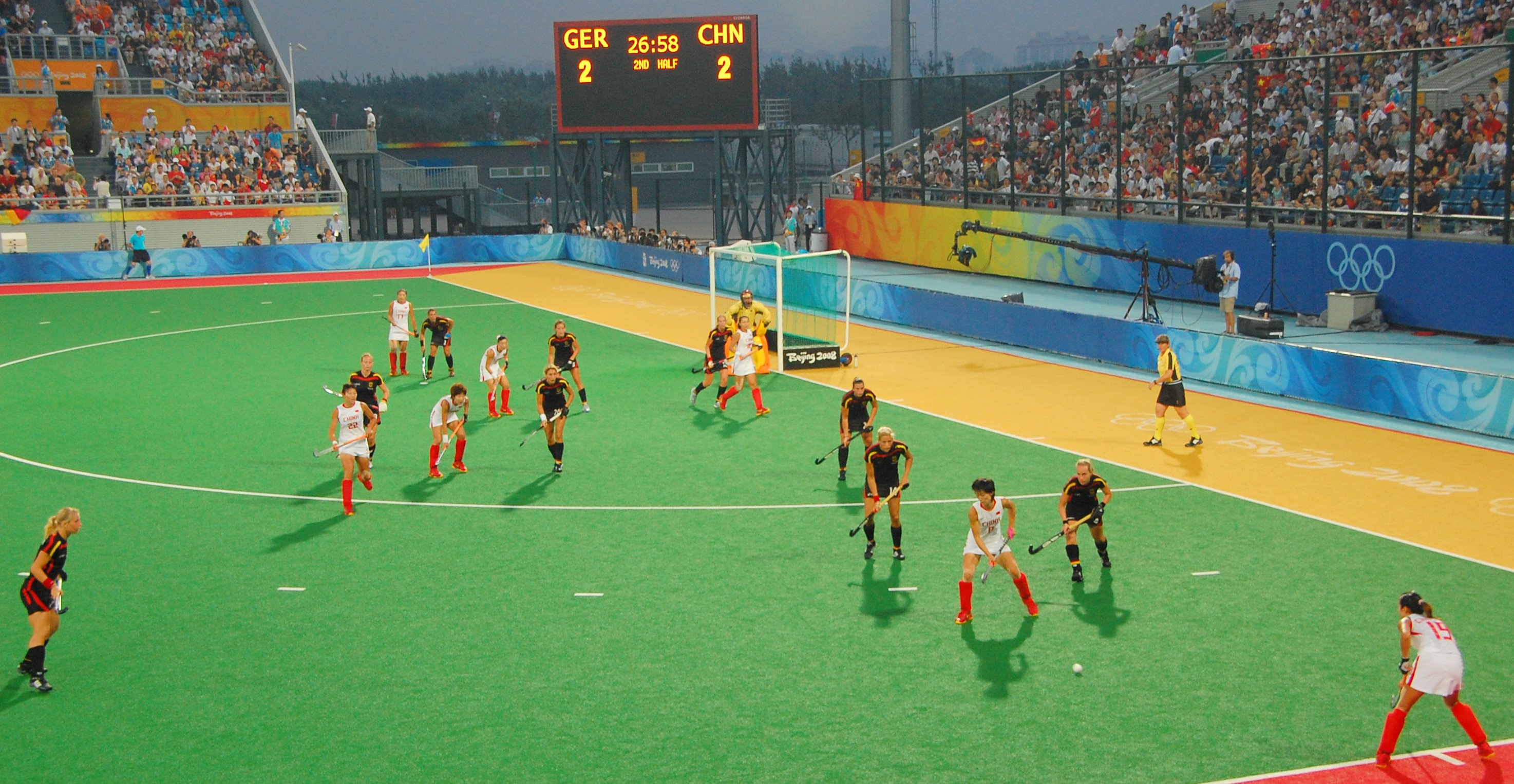
In most of the world, the term hockey when used without clarification refers to field hockey

The word "hockey" in Canada, the United States, Russia, and most of Eastern and Northern Europe, typically refers to ice hockey

== History ==
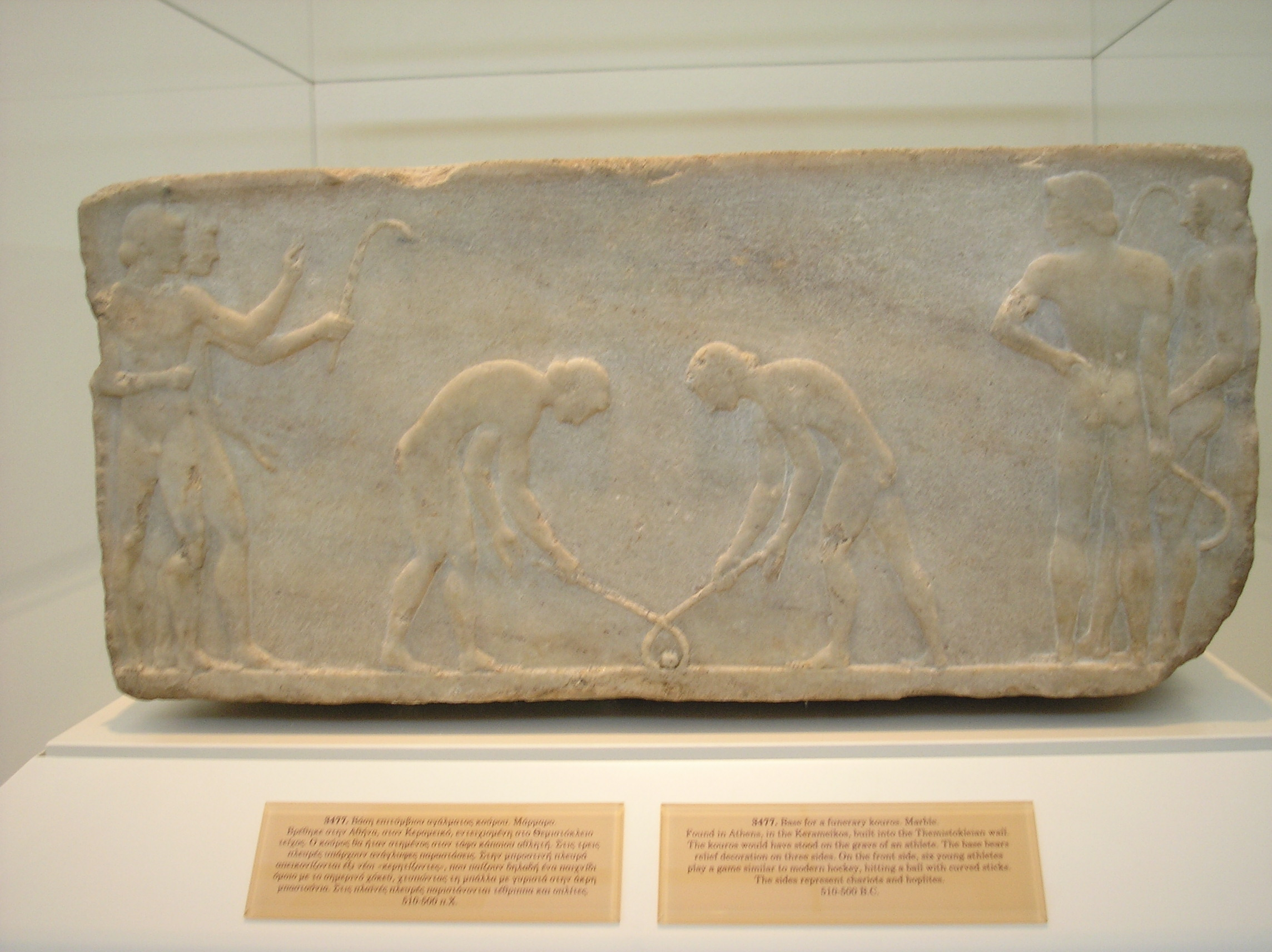
Bas relief approx. 600 BC, in the National Archaeological Museum of Athens

Games played with curved sticks and a ball can be found in the histories of many cultures. In Egypt, 4000-year-old carvings feature teams with sticks and a projectile, hurling dates to before 1272 BC in Ireland, and there is a depiction from approximately 600 BC in Ancient Greece, where the game may have been called kerētízein (κερητίζειν) because it was played with a horn or horn-like stick (kéras, κέρας). In Inner Mongolia, the Daur people have been playing beikou, a game similar to modern field hockey, for about 1,000 years. The Tio of the Republic of Congo played a hockey-like game with a ball called kuli. Most evidence of hockey-like games during the Middle Ages is found in legislation concerning sports and games. The Galway Statute enacted in Ireland in 1527 banned certain types of ball games, including games using "hooked" (written "hockie", similar to "hooky") sticks.

... at no tyme to use ne occupye the horlinge of the litill balle with hockie stickes or staves, nor use no hande ball to play withoute walles, but only greate foote balle

Bandy, ». a game, like that of Golf, in which the ad-verse parties endeavour to beat a ball (generally a knob or gnarl from the trunk of a tree,) opposite ways ... the stick with which the game is played is crook'd at the end.

By the 19th century, the various forms and divisions of historic games began to differentiate and coalesce into the individual sports defined today. Organizations dedicated to the codification of rules and regulations began to form, and national and international bodies sprang up to manage domestic and international competition.

== Subtypes ==
=== Field hockey ===
Field hockey is played on gravel, natural grass, or sand-based or water-based artificial turf, with a small, hard ball approximately 73 millimetres (2.9 in) in diameter. The game is popular among both men and women in many parts of the world, particularly in Europe, Asia, Australia, New Zealand, South Africa, and Argentina. In most countries, the game is played between single-sex sides, although they can be mixed-sex.

The governing body is the 126-member International Hockey Federation (FIH). Men's field hockey has been played at every Summer Olympic Games since 1908 except for 1912 and 1924, while women's field hockey has been played at the Summer Olympic Games since 1980. Modern field hockey sticks are constructed of a composite of wood, glass fibre or carbon fibre (sometimes both) and are J-shaped, with a curved hook at the playing end, a flat surface on the playing side and a curved surface on the rear side. All sticks are right-handed – left-handed sticks are not permitted. While field hockey in its current form appeared in mid-18th century England, primarily in schools, it was not until the first half of the 19th century that it became firmly established. The first club was created in 1849 at Blackheath in south-east London. Field hockey is the national sport of Pakistan. It was the national sport of India until the Ministry of Youth Affairs and Sports declared in August 2012 that India has no national sport.

==== Indoor hockey ====
Indoor hockey is an indoor variant of field hockey. It is similar to the outdoor game in that two teams compete to move a hard ball into the goal of the opposing side using hockey sticks. Indoor hockey is played on a smaller area and between smaller teams than field hockey and the sidelines are replaced by solid barriers from which the ball rebounds and remains in play.

Hockey variants governed by FIH

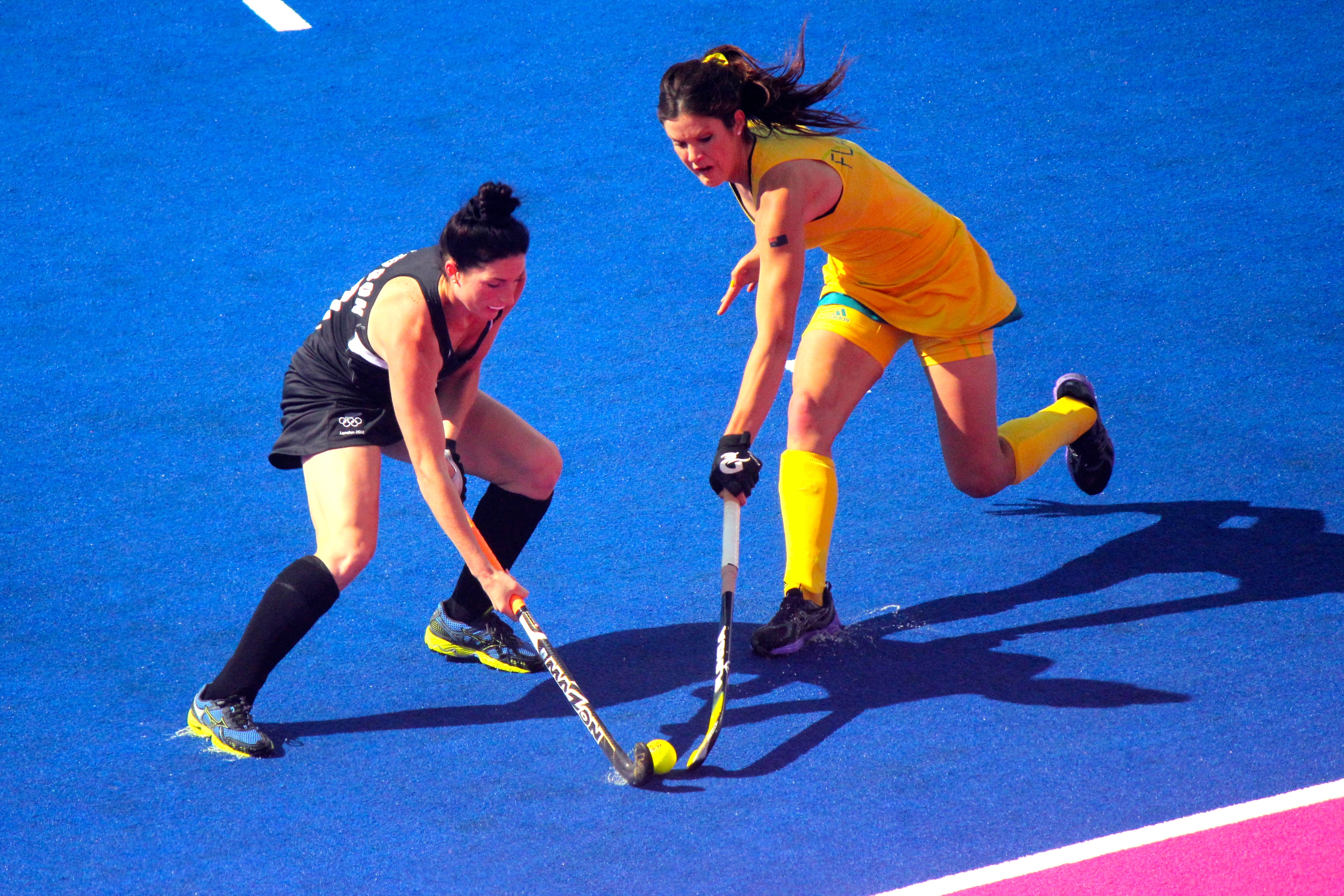
Field hockey

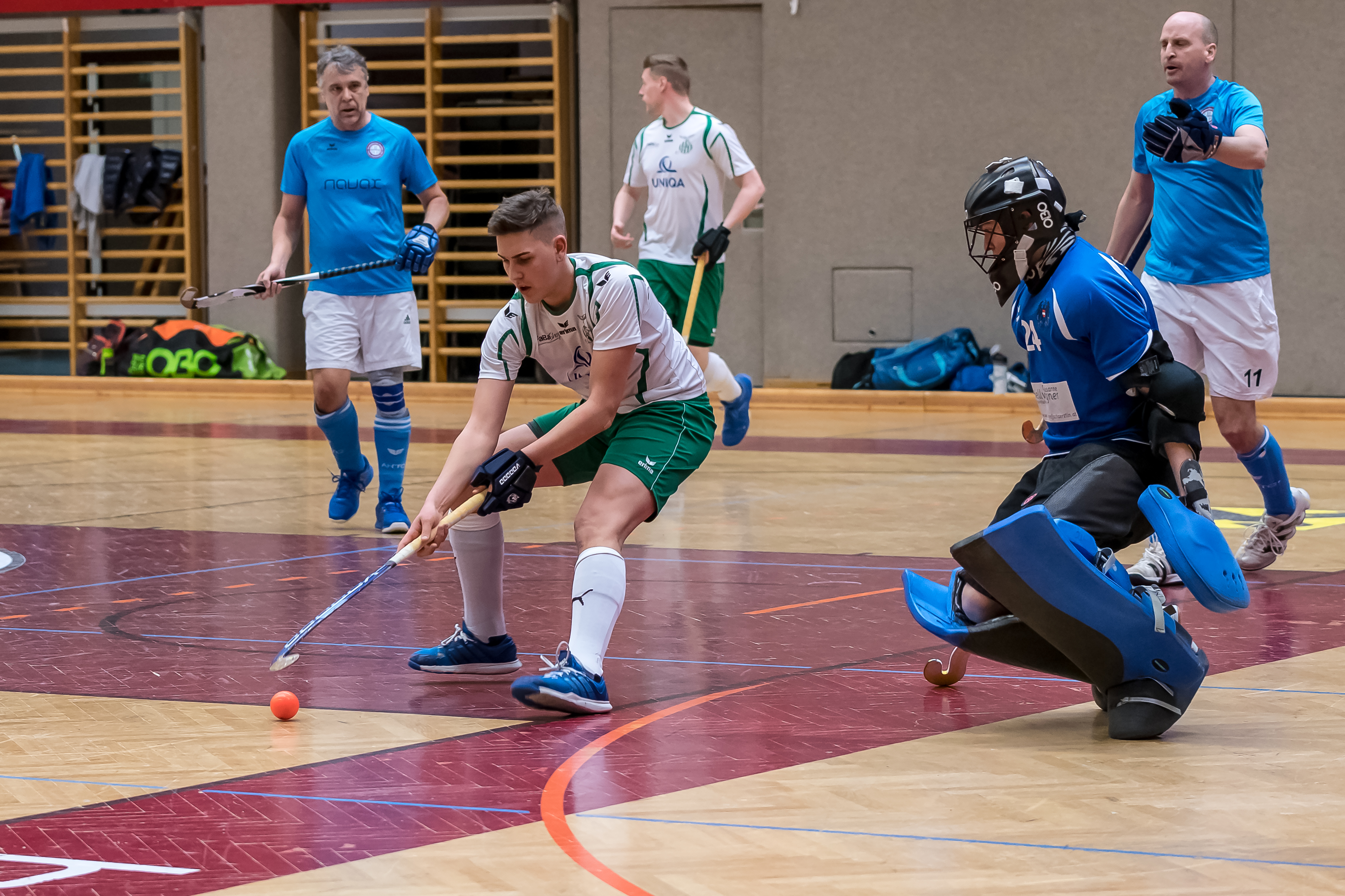
Indoor hockey

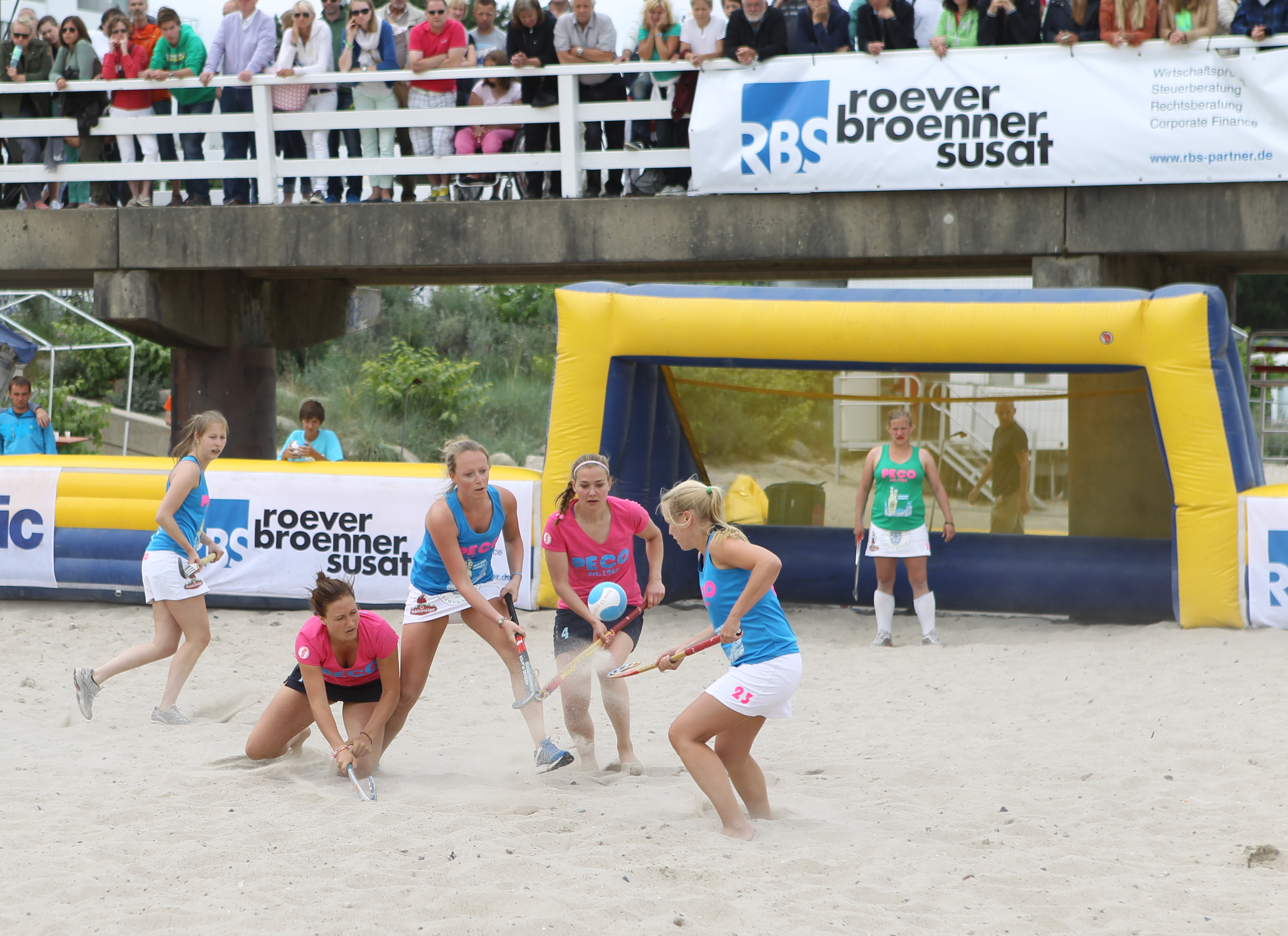
Beach hockey

=== On ice ===
==== Bandy ====
Bandy is played with a ball on a football pitch-sized ice arena (bandy rink), typically outdoors, and with many rules similar to association football. It is played professionally in Russia and Sweden. The sport is recognized by the IOC, including the variety rink bandy. Its international governing body is the Federation of International Bandy. Bandy has its roots in England in the 19th century, was originally called "hockey on the ice", and spread from England to other European countries around 1900 (the first international match took place in early 1891, when Bury Fen Bandy Club visited Haarlem). A similar Russian sport can also be seen as a predecessor and in Russia, bandy is sometimes called "Russian hockey". Bandy World Championships have been played since 1957 and Women's Bandy World Championships since 2004. There are national club championships in many countries and the top clubs in the world play in the Bandy World Cup every year.

==== Ice hockey ====
Ice hockey is played between two teams of skaters on a large flat area of ice, using a three-inch-diameter (76.2 mm) vulcanized rubber disc called a puck. This puck is often frozen before high-level games to decrease the amount of bouncing and friction on the ice. The game is played all over North America, Europe and to varying extents in many other countries around the world. It is the most popular sport in Canada, Finland, Latvia, the Czech Republic, and Slovakia. Ice hockey is the national sport of Latvia and the national winter sport of Canada. Ice hockey is played at a number of levels, by all ages. The governing body of international play is the 77-member International Ice Hockey Federation (IIHF). Men's ice hockey has been played at the Winter Olympics since 1924, and was in the 1920 Summer Olympics. Women's ice hockey was added to the Winter Olympics in 1998. North America's National Hockey League (NHL) is the strongest professional ice hockey league, drawing top ice hockey players from around the globe. The NHL rules are slightly different from those used in Olympic ice hockey over many categories. International ice hockey rules were adopted from Canadian rules in the early 1900s. The contemporary sport developed in Canada from European and native influences. These included various stick and ball games similar to field hockey, bandy and other games where two teams push a ball or object back and forth with sticks. These were played outdoors on ice under the name "hockey" in England throughout the 19th century, and even earlier under various other names. In Canada, there are 24 reports of hockey-like games in the 19th century before 1875 (five of them using the name "hockey"). The first organized and recorded game of ice hockey was played indoors in Montreal, Quebec, Canada, on March 3, 1875, and featured several McGill University students. Ice hockey sticks are long L-shaped sticks made of wood, graphite, or composites with a blade at the bottom that can lie flat on the playing surface when the stick is held upright and can legally curve either way, for left- or right-handed players.

==== Para ice hockey ====
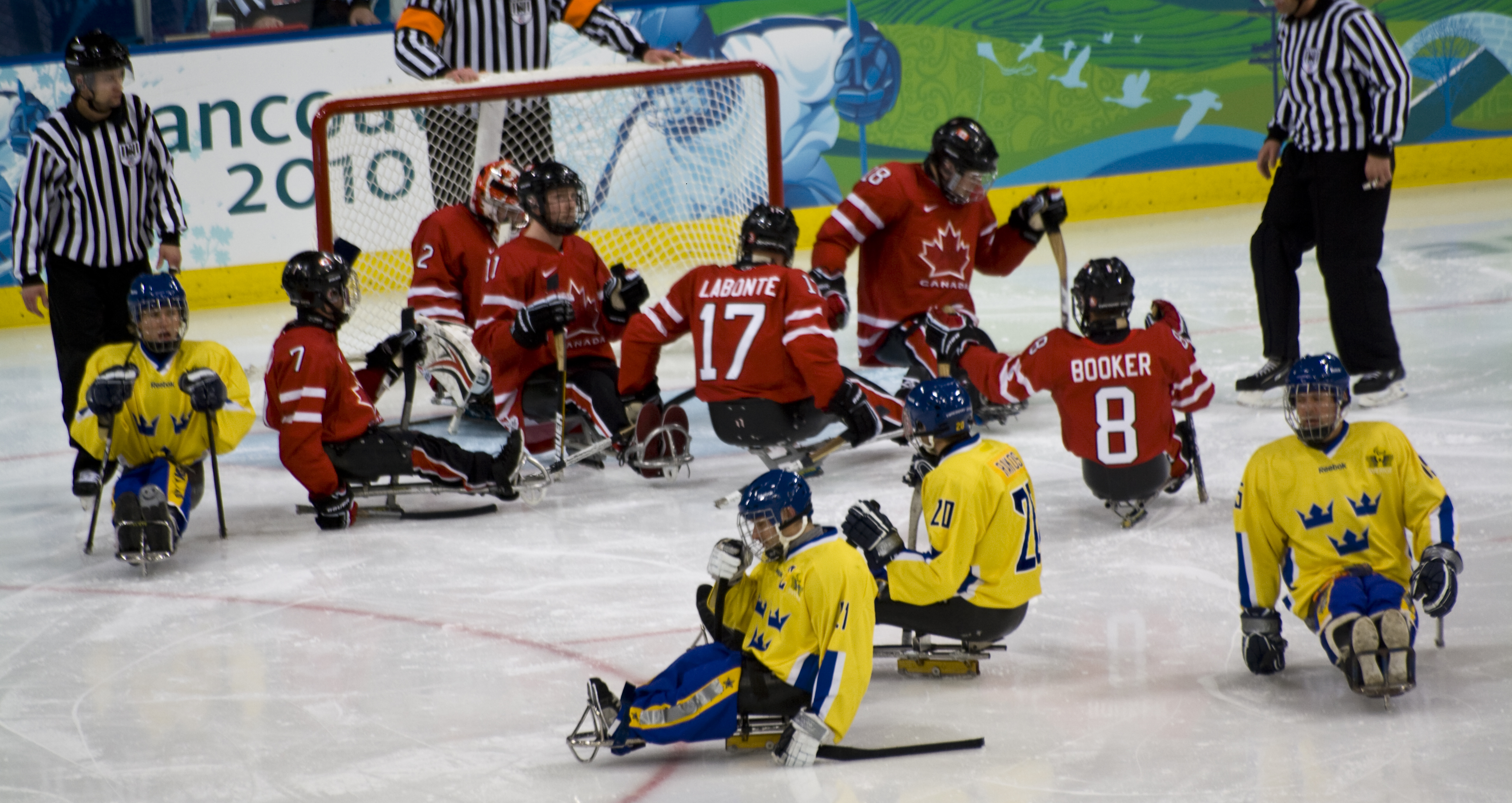
Sledge hockey or "sled hockey" (now called "Para ice hockey") is the only hockey sport on ice created exclusively for participants with physical disabilities.

Sledge hockey, a variant of ice hockey designed for players with physical disabilities, was created in the 1960s and has since been renamed "Para ice hockey".

Ice sledge hockey, or "para ice hockey", is a form of ice hockey designed for players with physical disabilities affecting their lower bodies. Players sit on double-bladed sledges and use two sticks; each stick has a blade at one end and small picks at the other. Players use the sticks to pass, stickhandle and shoot the puck, and to propel their sledges. The rules are very similar to IIHF ice hockey rules. Canada is a recognized international leader in the development of sledge hockey, and much of the equipment for the sport was first developed there, such as sledge hockey sticks laminated with fiberglass, as well as aluminium shafts with hand-carved insert blades and special aluminium sledges with regulation skate blades.

Hockey variants played on ice

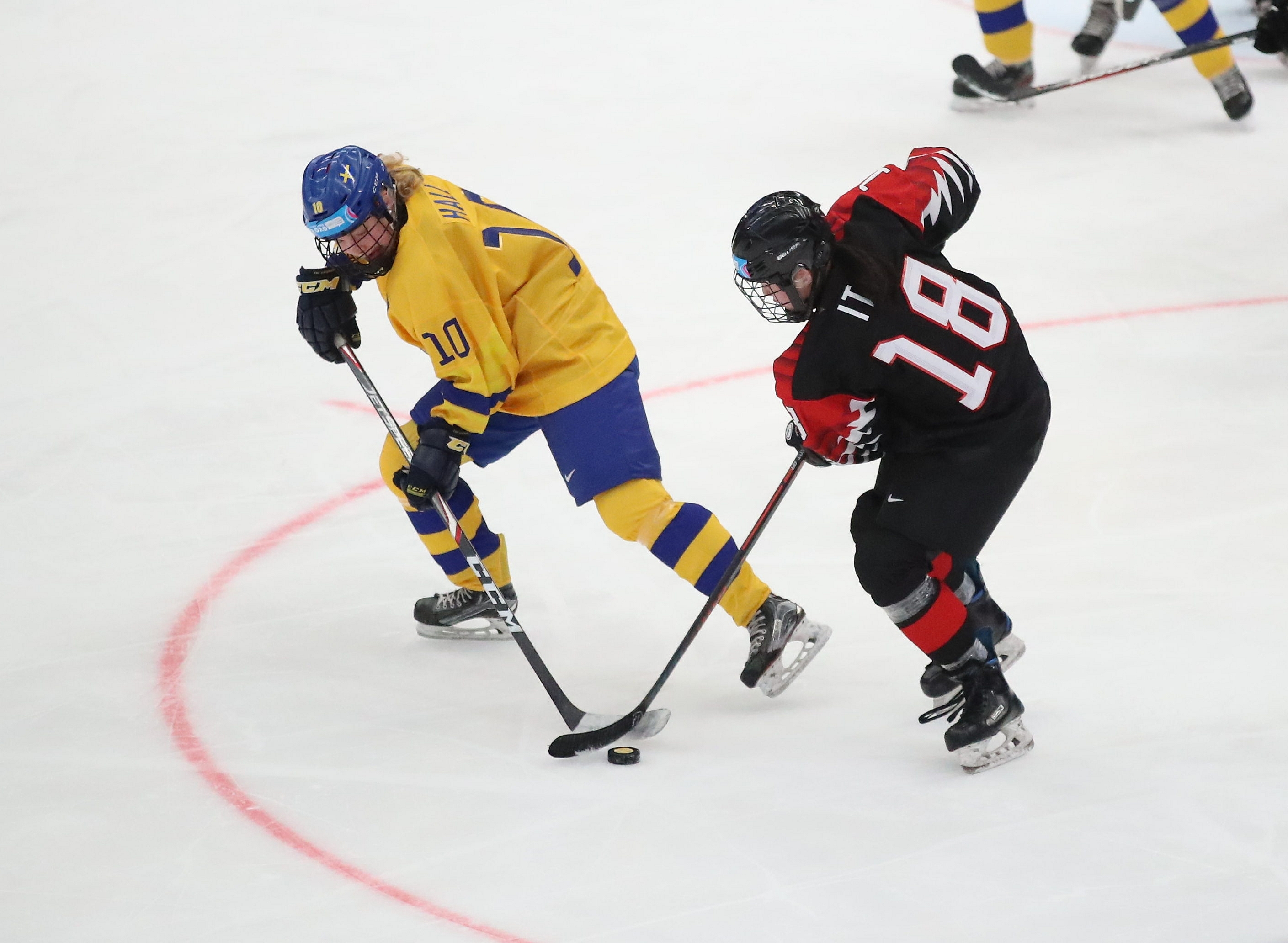
Ice hockey

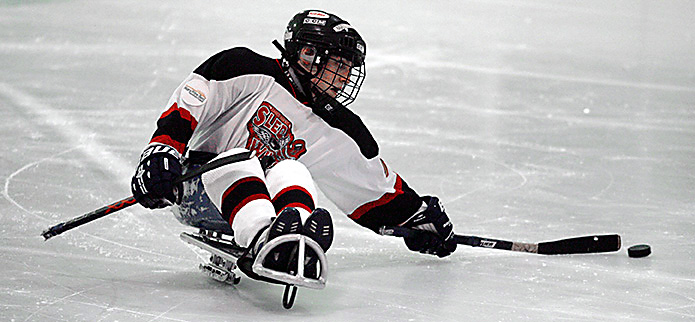
Para ice hockey

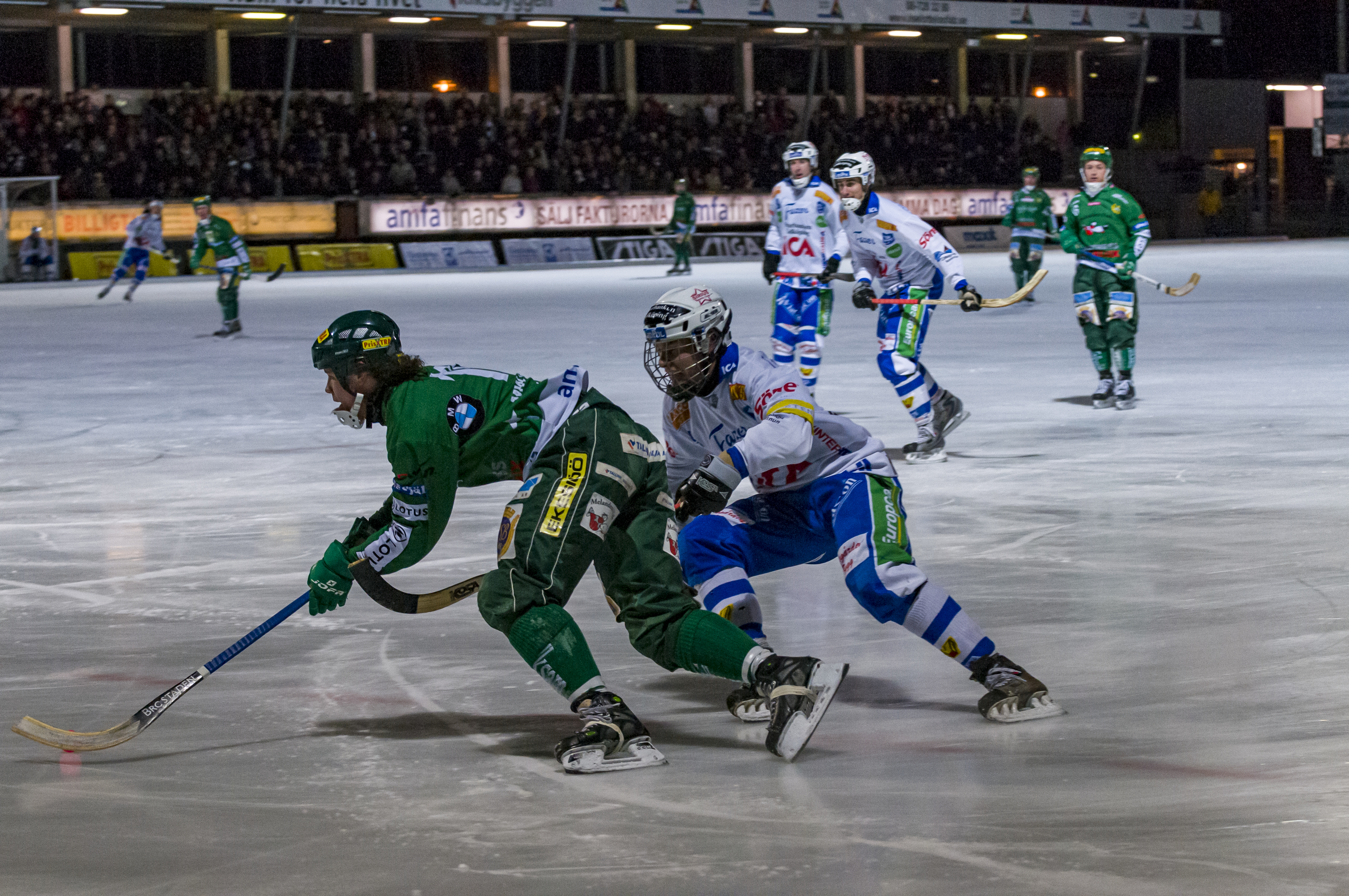
Bandy

=== Roller hockey ===
==== Inline hockey ====
Though inline hockey is considered a variant of roller hockey a.k.a. "rink hockey", it was derived from ice hockey instead and uses a type of hockey puck or a ball. Both roller games use a type of wheeled skate but inline hockey uses inline skates rather than roller skates or "quads". There are puck-based and ball-based variants. Inline hockey puck variant is played by two teams, consisting of four skaters and one goalie, on a dry rink divided into two halves by a center line, with one net at each end of the rink. The game is played in two 20-minute periods. The sport is recognized as being governed by World Skate which organizes FIRS Inline Hockey World Championships. The International Ice Hockey Federation organized IIHF Inline Hockey World Championships but it has discontinued. On the other hand, ball-based variant is governed by International Inline Skater Hockey Federation.

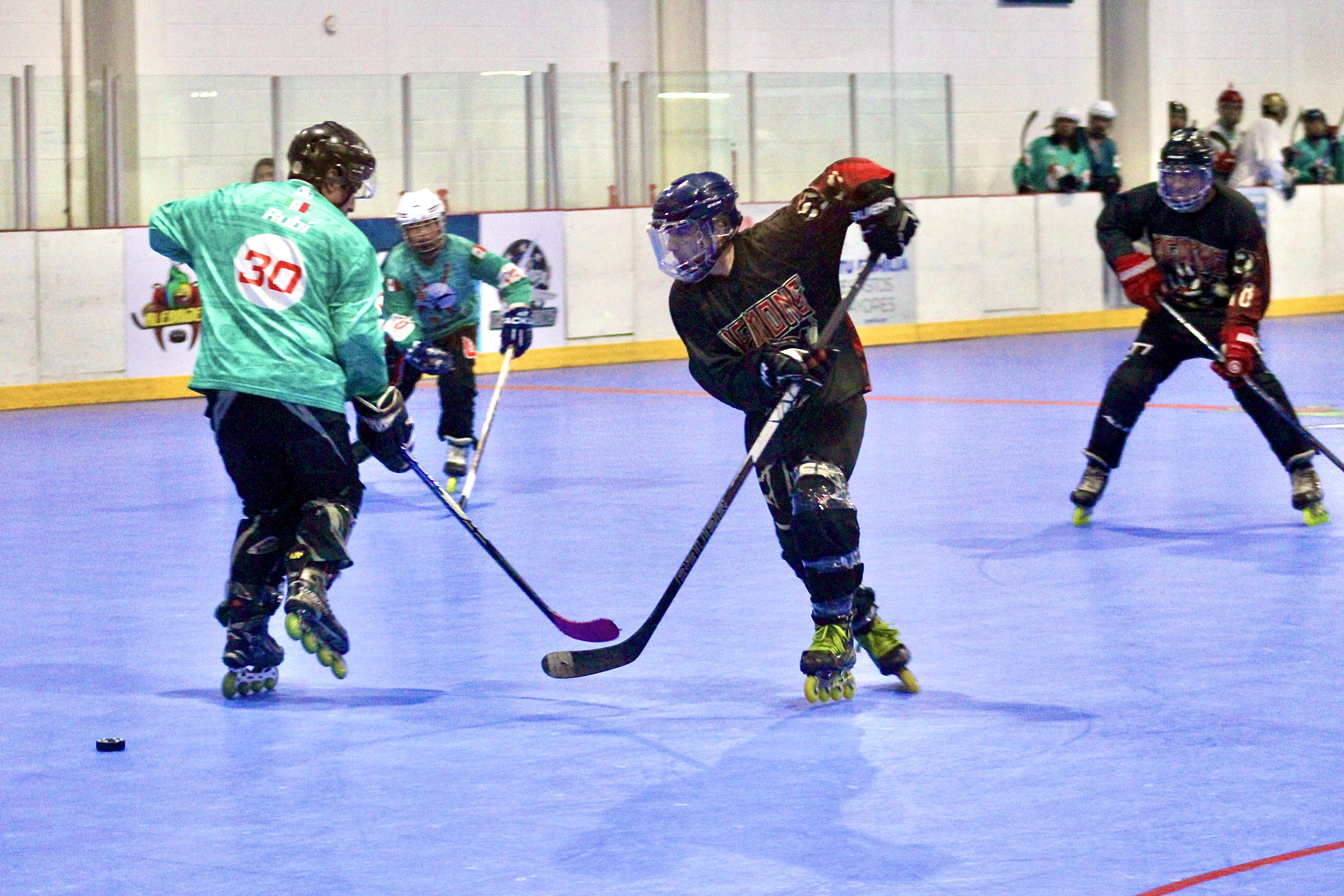
Inline hockey using a puck is governed by World Skate

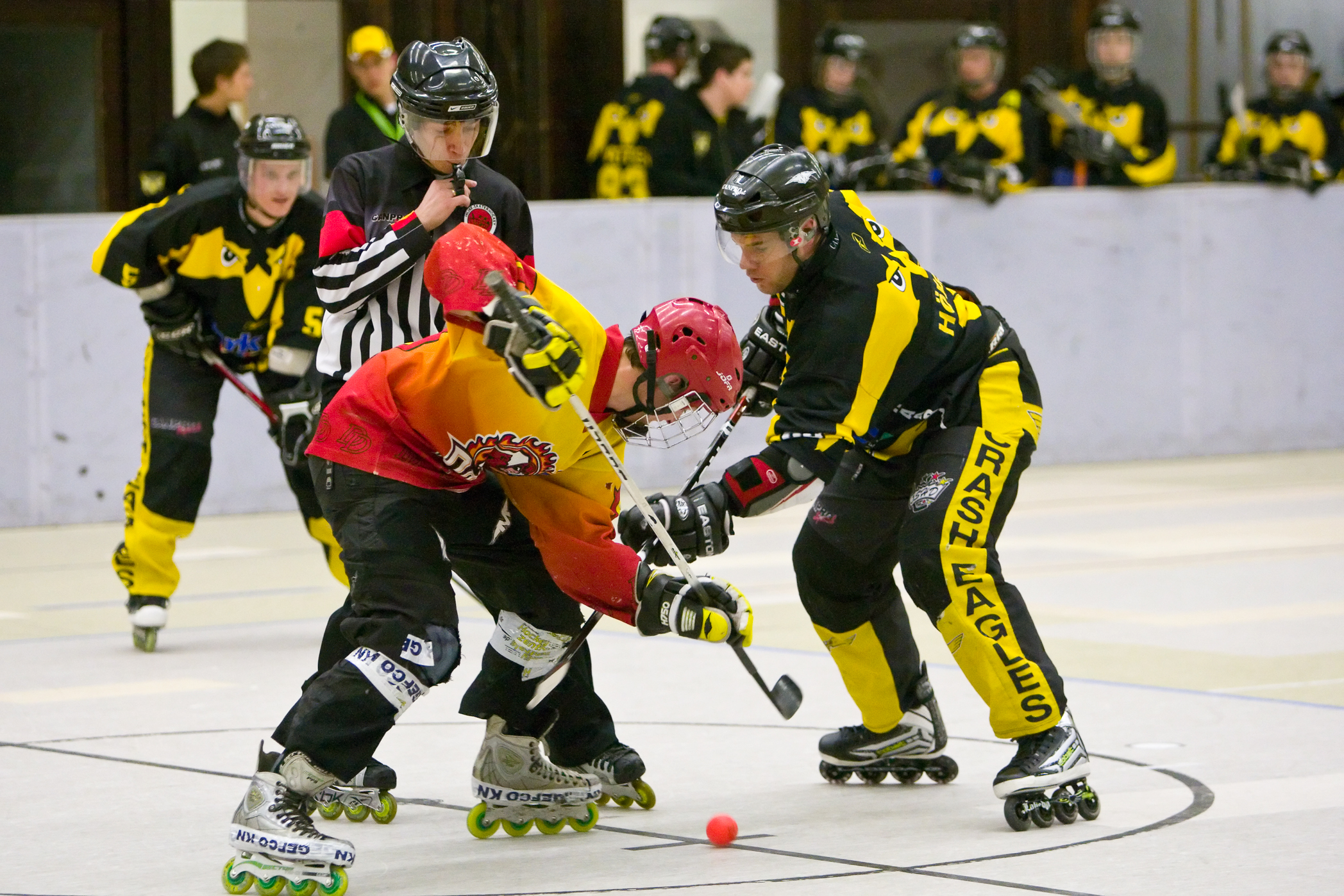
Inline hockey using a ball is governed by International Inline Skater Hockey Federation

==== Inline sledge hockey ====
Based on ice sledge hockey, inline sledge hockey is played to the same rules as inline puck hockey (essentially ice hockey played off-ice using inline skates). There is no classification point system dictating who can play inline sledge hockey, unlike the situation with other team sports such as wheelchair basketball and wheelchair rugby. Inline sledge hockey is being developed to allow everyone, regardless of whether they have a disability or not, to complete up to world championship level based solely on talent and ability. The first game of organized inline sledge hockey was played at Bisley, Surrey, England, on December 19, 2009, between the Hull Stingrays and the Grimsby Redwings. Matt Lloyd is credited with inventing inline sledge hockey, and Great Britain is seen as the international leader in the game's development.

==== Roller hockey (quad) ====
Roller hockey, also known as "rink hockey", "quad hockey", "international-style ball hockey", and "Hoquei em Patins", is an overarching name for a roller sport that uses quad skates. It has existed long before the invention of inline skates. The sport is played in over sixty countries and has a worldwide following. Roller hockey was a demonstration sport at the 1992 Barcelona Summer Olympics.

Roller hockey variants

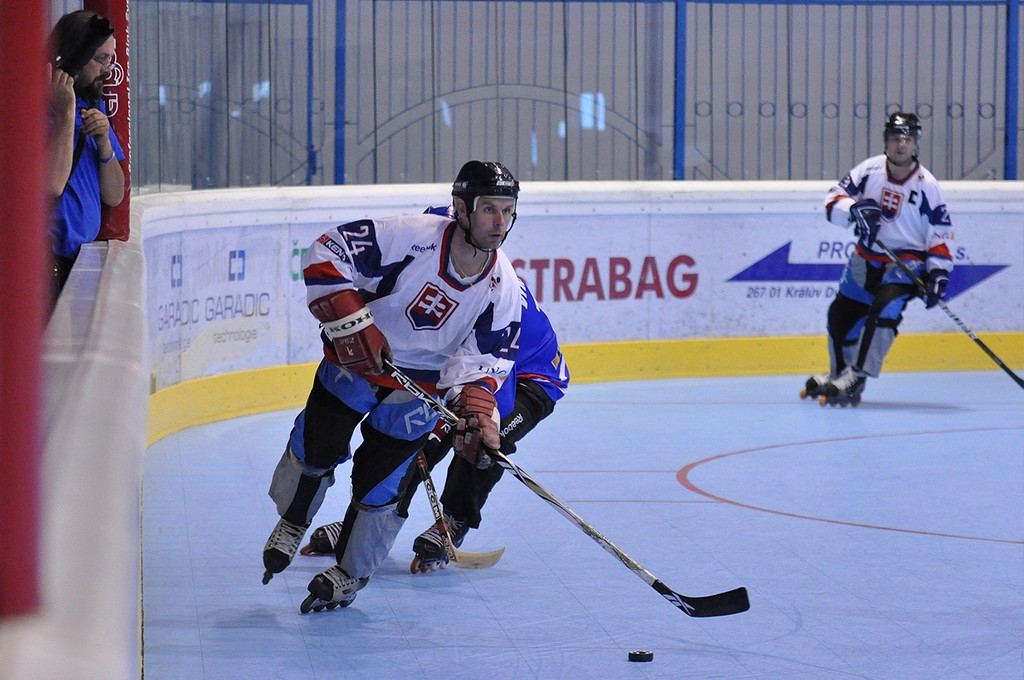
Inline hockey

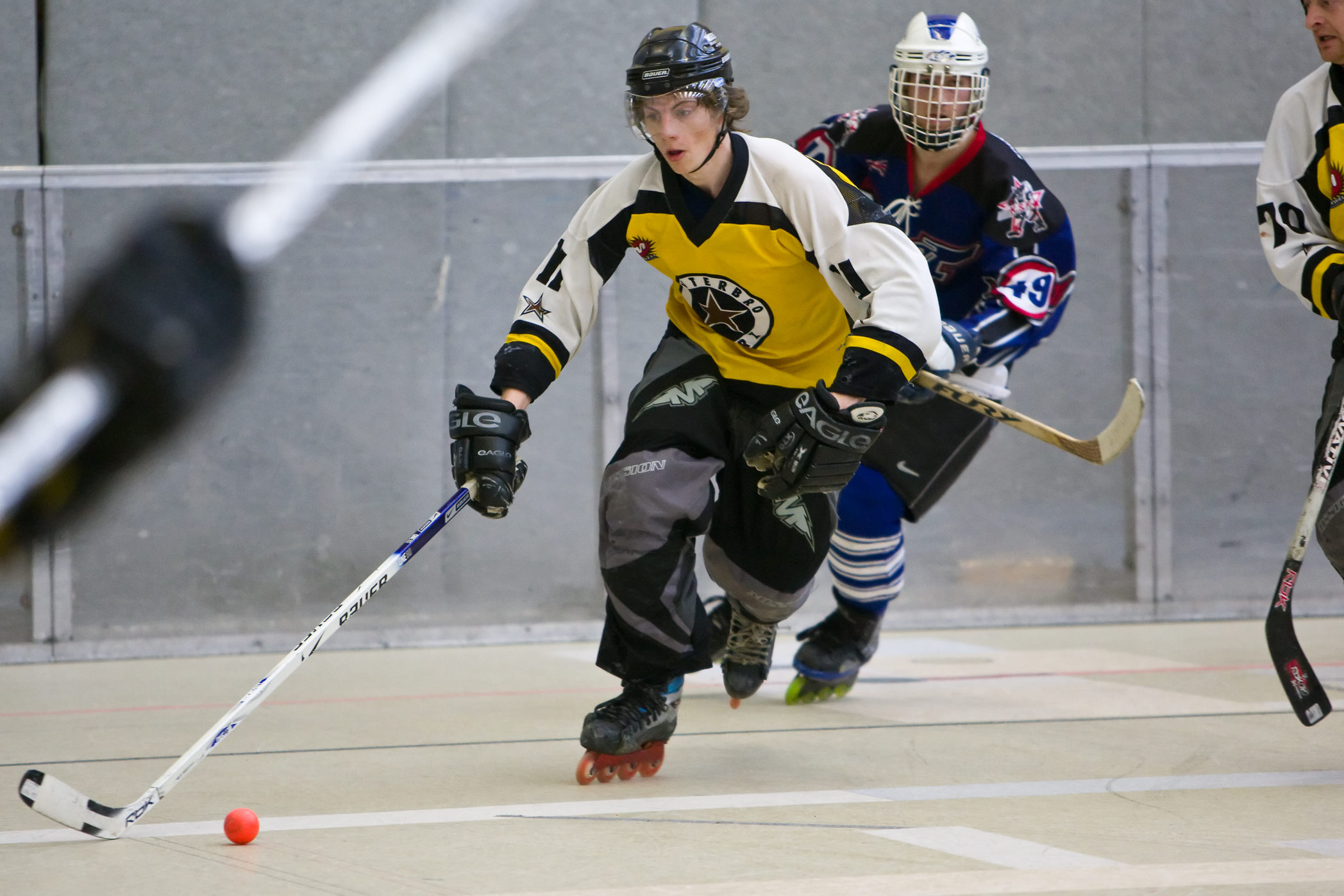
Inline skater hockey

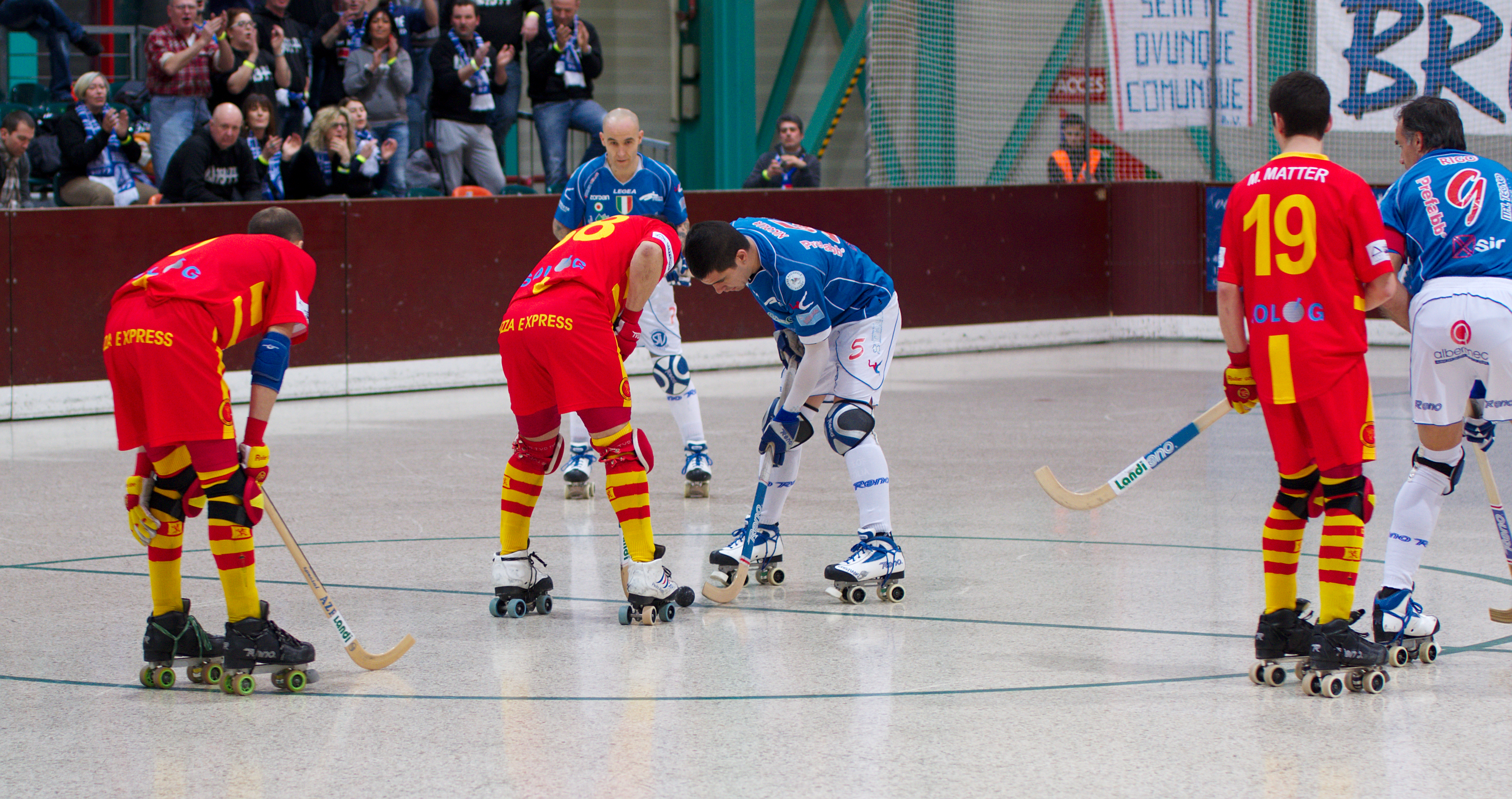
Quad hockey

=== Floor hockey ===
Floor hockey a variety of games with different codes usually played on foot on a flat, smooth floor surface, usually indoors in gymnasiums or similar spaces.

==== Floorball ====
Floorball is a form of hockey played in a gymnasium or in a sports hall. A whiffle ball is used instead of a plastic ball, and the sticks are only one meter long and made from composite materials.

==== Ball hockey ====
Ball hockey is a variant of floor hockey and street hockey, and more specifically, an off-ice variant of ice hockey.

Variants of Floor hockey

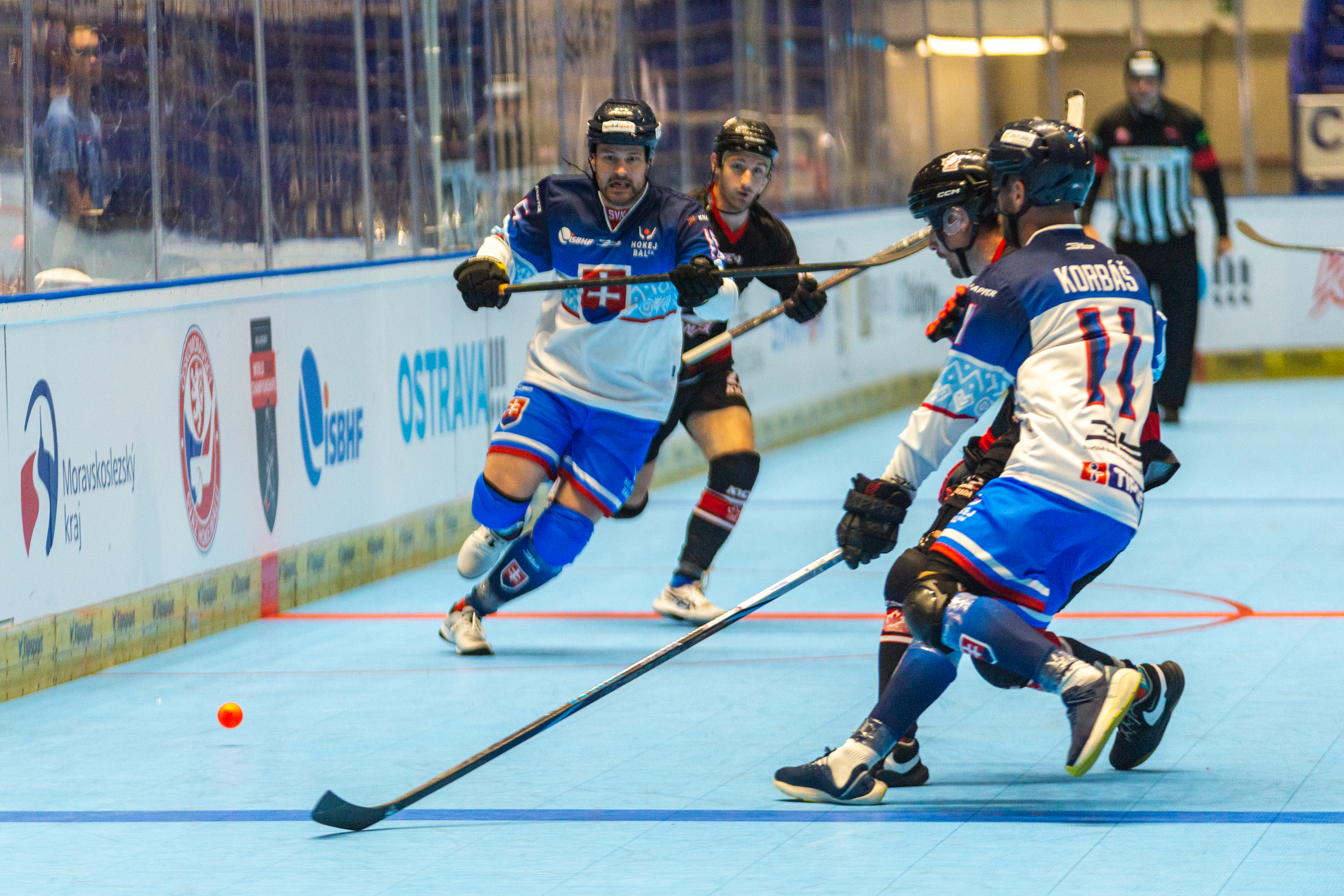
Ball hockey

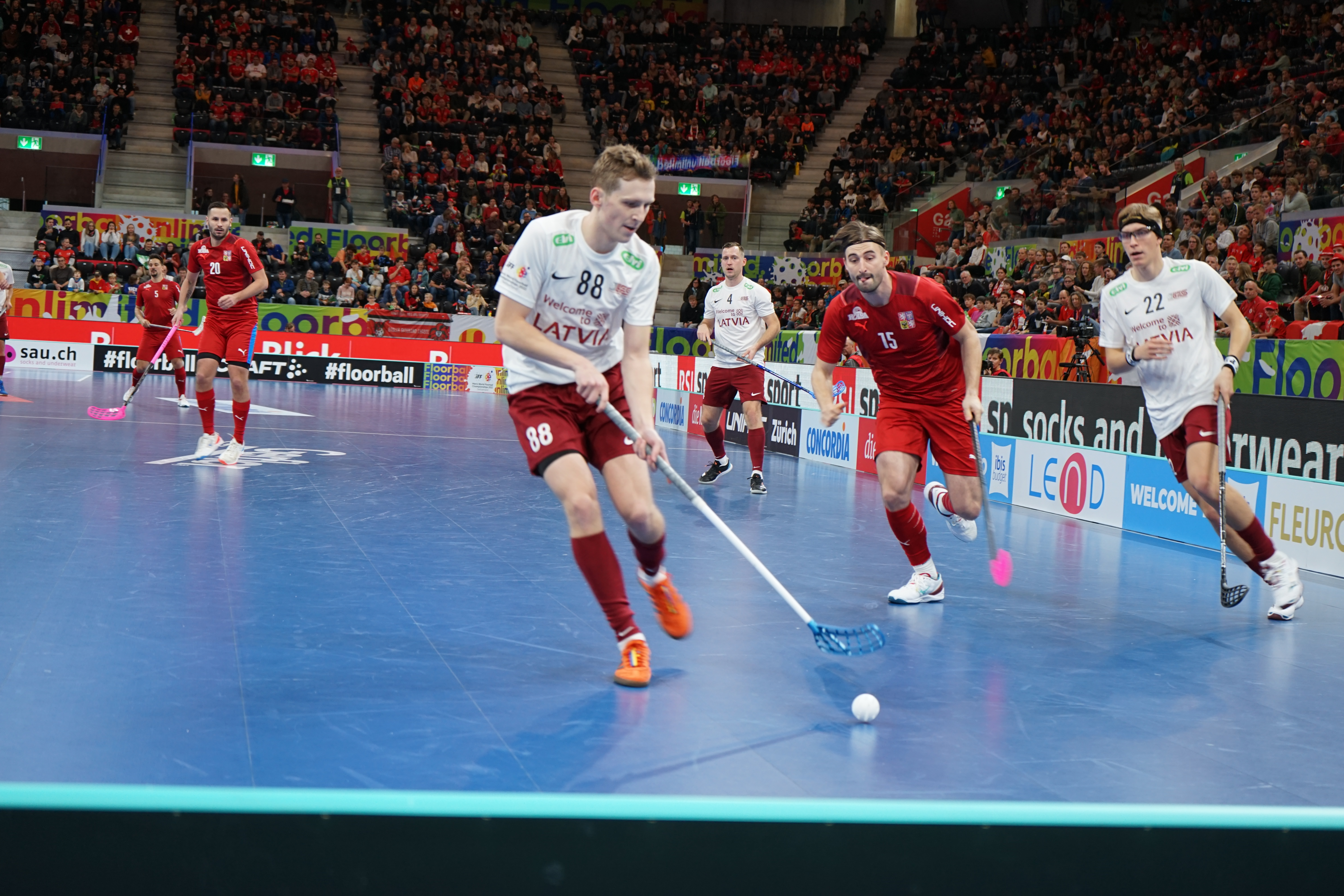
Floorball

=== Street hockey ===
Also known as road hockey, this is a dry-land variant of ice and roller hockey played year-round on a hard surface (usually asphalt). A ball is usually used instead of a puck, and protective equipment is not usually worn.

== Other forms of hockey ==
Other games derived from hockey or its predecessors include the following:

- Air hockey is played indoors with a puck on an air-cushion table.
- Beach hockey, a variation of street hockey, is a common sight on Southern California beaches.
- Box hockey is a schoolyard game played by two people. The object of the game is to move a hockey puck from the center of the box out through a hole placed at the end of the box (known as the goal). The players kneel facing one another on either side of the box, and each attempts to move the puck to the hole on their left.
- Broomball is played on an ice hockey rink, but with a ball instead of a puck and a "broom" (actually a stick with a small plastic implement on the end) in place of the ice hockey stick. Instead of skates, special shoes are used that have very soft rubbery soles to maximize grip while running around.
- Deck hockey is traditionally played by the Royal Navy on ships' decks, using short wooden L-shaped sticks.
- Foot hockey or sock hockey is played using a bald tennis ball or rolled-up pair of socks and using only the feet. It is popular in elementary schools in the winter.
- Gena is a field hockey sport played in Ethiopia, with which the Ethiopian Christmas festival shares its name. The equipment consists of a strong stick curved at one end, and a ball of two kinds: either called srur (made out of a rounded piece of hard-wood) or tsng (made by weaving a long strip of leather into a rounded shape).
- Gym ringette is the off-ice floor variant of the ice skating team sport of ringette rather than ice hockey. It is not a direct variant of the style of floor hockey which helped inspire ringette.
- Gym hockey is a form of ice hockey played in a gymnasium. It uses sticks with foam ends and a foam ball or a plastic puck.
- Hurling and Camogie are Irish games bearing some resemblance to – and notable differences from – hockey.
- Mini hockey (or knee-hockey), also known as "mini-sticks" is a form of hockey played in the United States and Canada in the basements of houses. Players kneel, or crouch, and use a miniature plastic stick, usually about 15 inches (38 cm) long, to manoeuvre a small ball or a soft, fabric-covered mini puck into miniature goals. In England 'mini hockey' refers to a seven-a-side version of field hockey for younger players, played on an area equivalent to half a normal pitch.
- Nok Hockey is a table-top version of hockey played with no defence and a small block in front of the goal.
- Pond hockey is a simplified form of ice hockey played on naturally frozen ice.
- Power hockey is a form of hockey for persons requiring the use of an electric (power) wheelchair in daily life.
- Ringette is primarily a variant of an early 20th century style of floor hockey, but played on ice hockey skates and designed for female players; it uses a straight stick and an air-filled rubber ring in place of a floor hockey puck (open disk). Though played on ice hockey rinks, the rules and strategy differ considerably from those of ice hockey and bear a closer resemblance to basketball. It should not be confused with gym ringette which is the floor variant of the ice sport.
- Rink bandy and rinkball are team sports of Scandinavian origin. Both were influenced by bandy, but are played on ice hockey rinks and involve fewer players on each team.
- Rossall hockey is a variation played at Rossall School on the sea shore in the winter months. Its rules are a mix of field hockey, rugby and the Eton wall game.
- Shinny is an informal version of ice hockey.
- Shinty is a Scottish game now played primarily in the Highlands
- Spongee is a cross between ice hockey and broomball and is most popular in Manitoba, Canada. A stick and puck are used as in hockey (the puck is a softer version called a "sponge puck"), and the same soft-soled shoes are worn as in broomball. The rules are basically the same as for ice hockey, but one variation has an extra player on the ice called a "rover".
- Table hockey is played indoors on a table.
- Underwater hockey is played with a weighted puck on the bottom of a swimming pool.
- Underwater ice hockey is similar to underwater hockey but played with floating puck on the underside of a frozen swimming pool.
- Unicycle hockey is played on a hard surface using unicycles as the method of player movement. There is generally no dedicated goalkeeper.
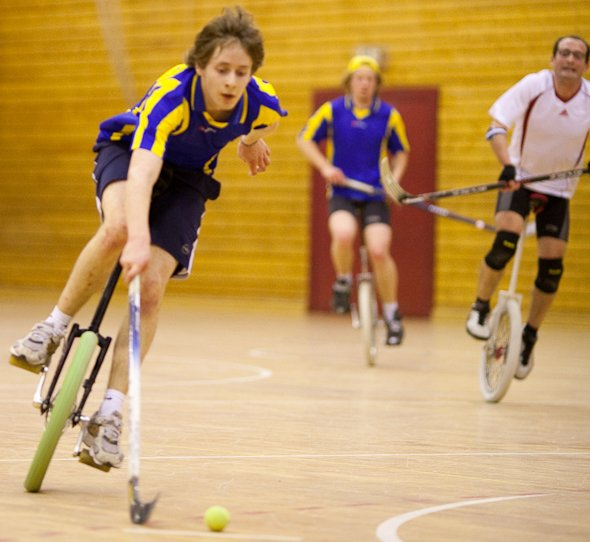
Unicycle hockey

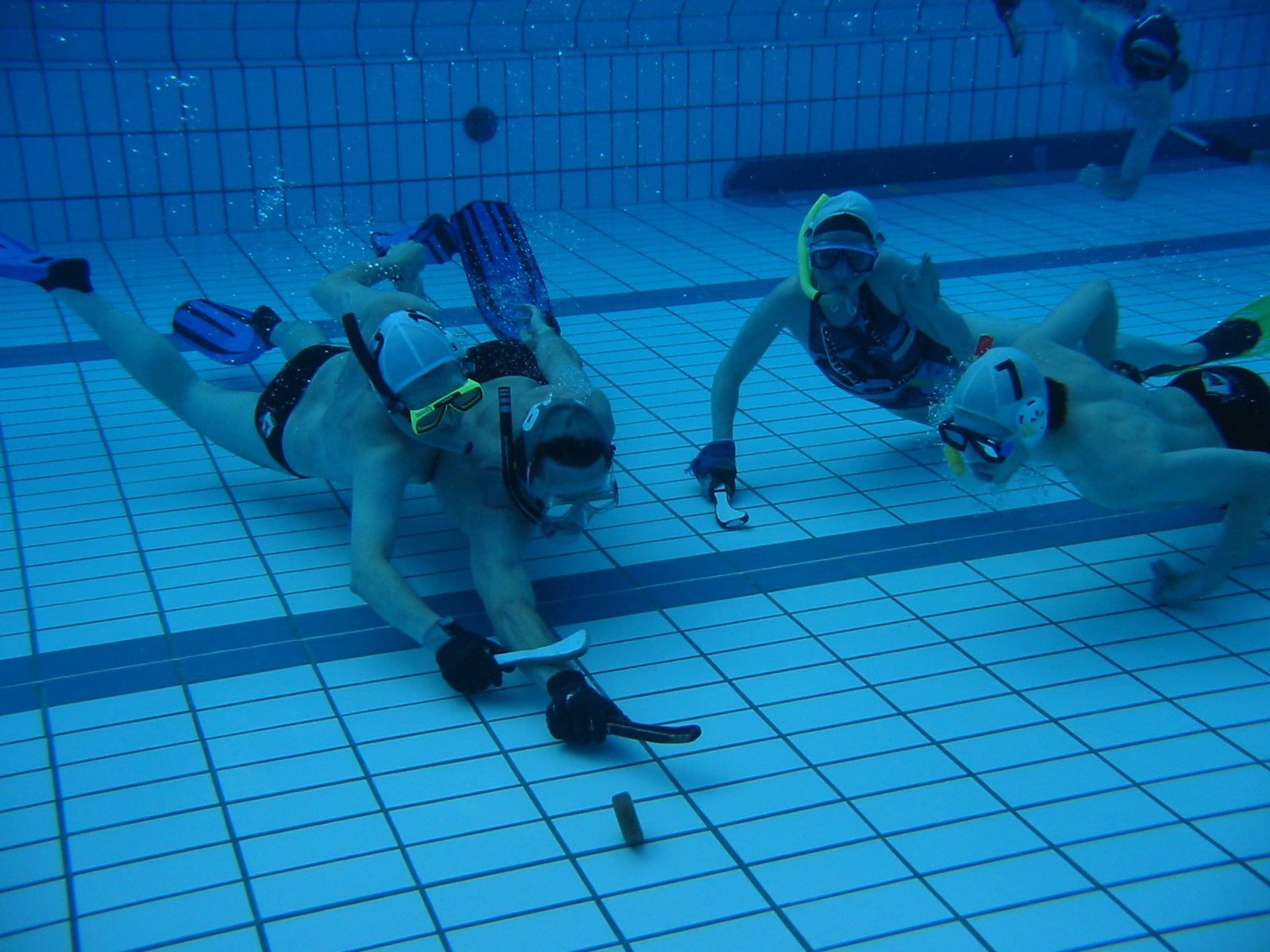
Underwater hockey

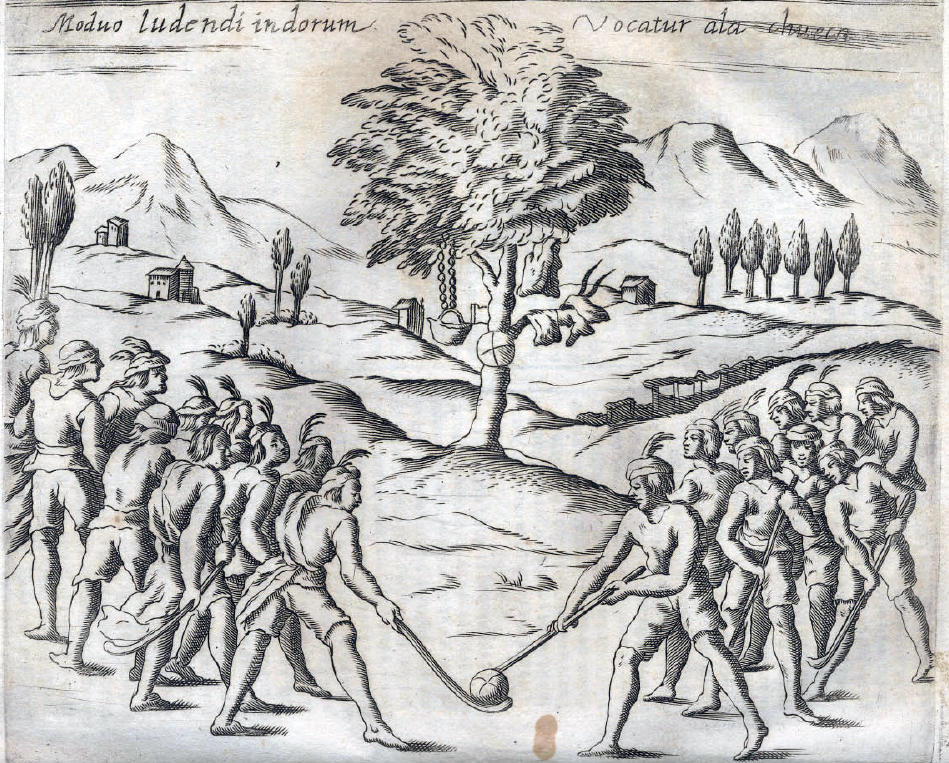
Native Mapuches playing palín, shown in Histórica Relación del Reino de Chile by Alonso de Ovalle, Rome, 1646

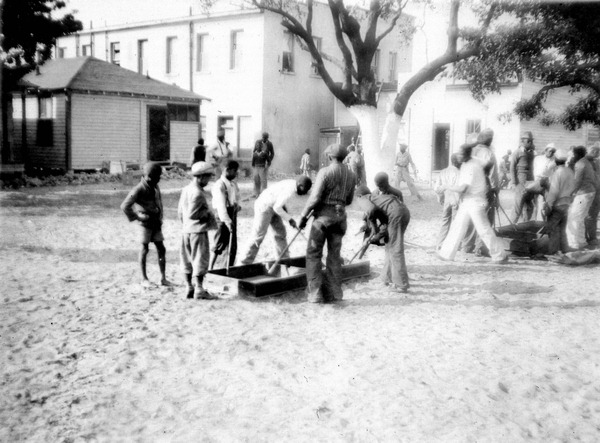
Box Hockey being played in Miami, Florida, 1935

== Equipment ==
=== Goalposts ===
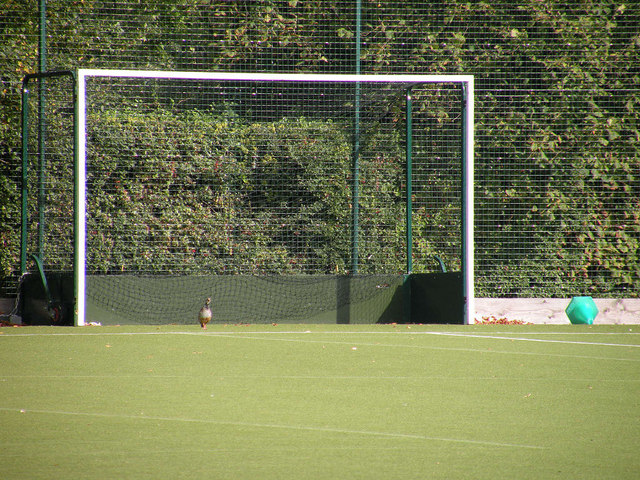
Field hockey

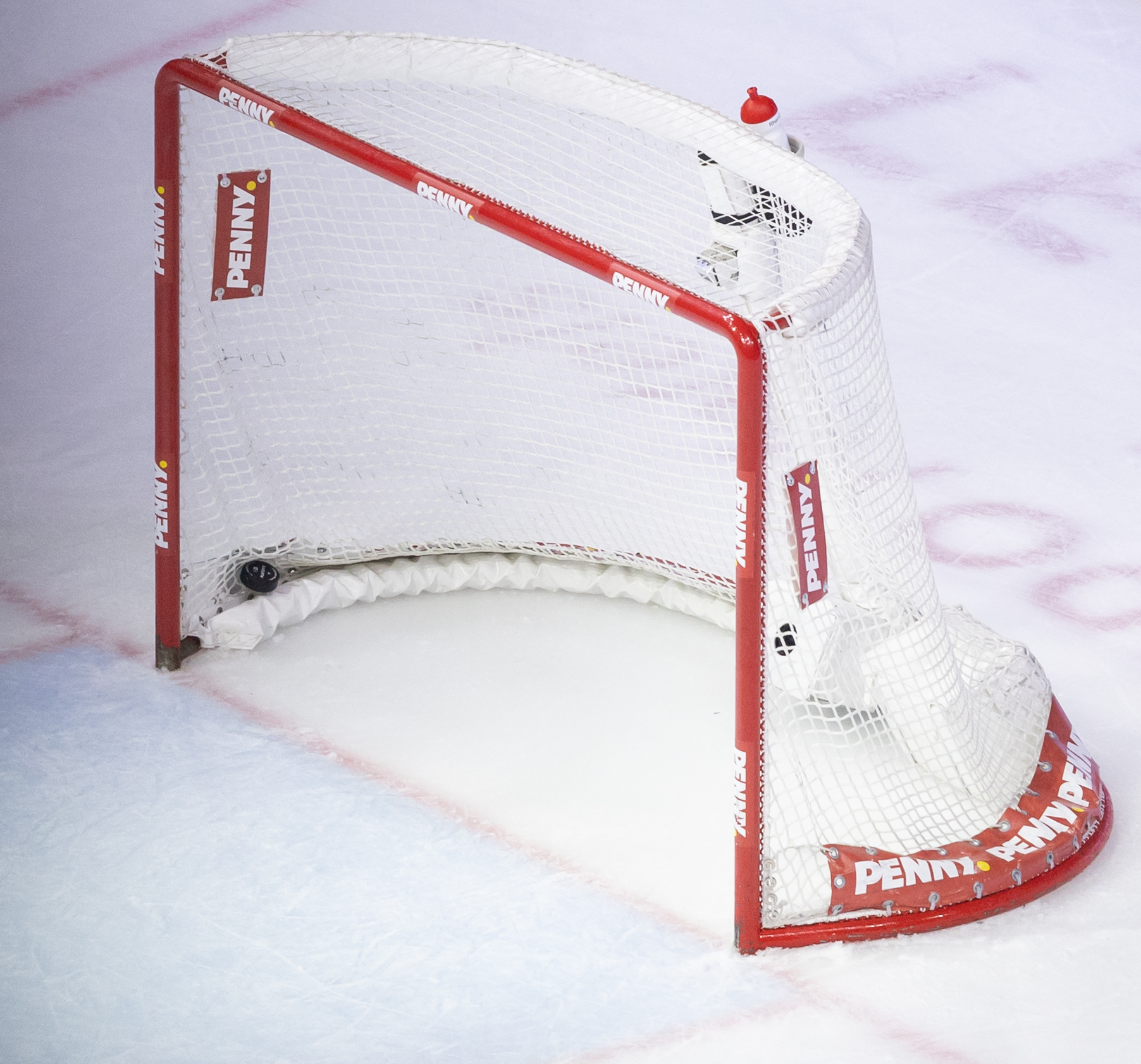
Ice hockey

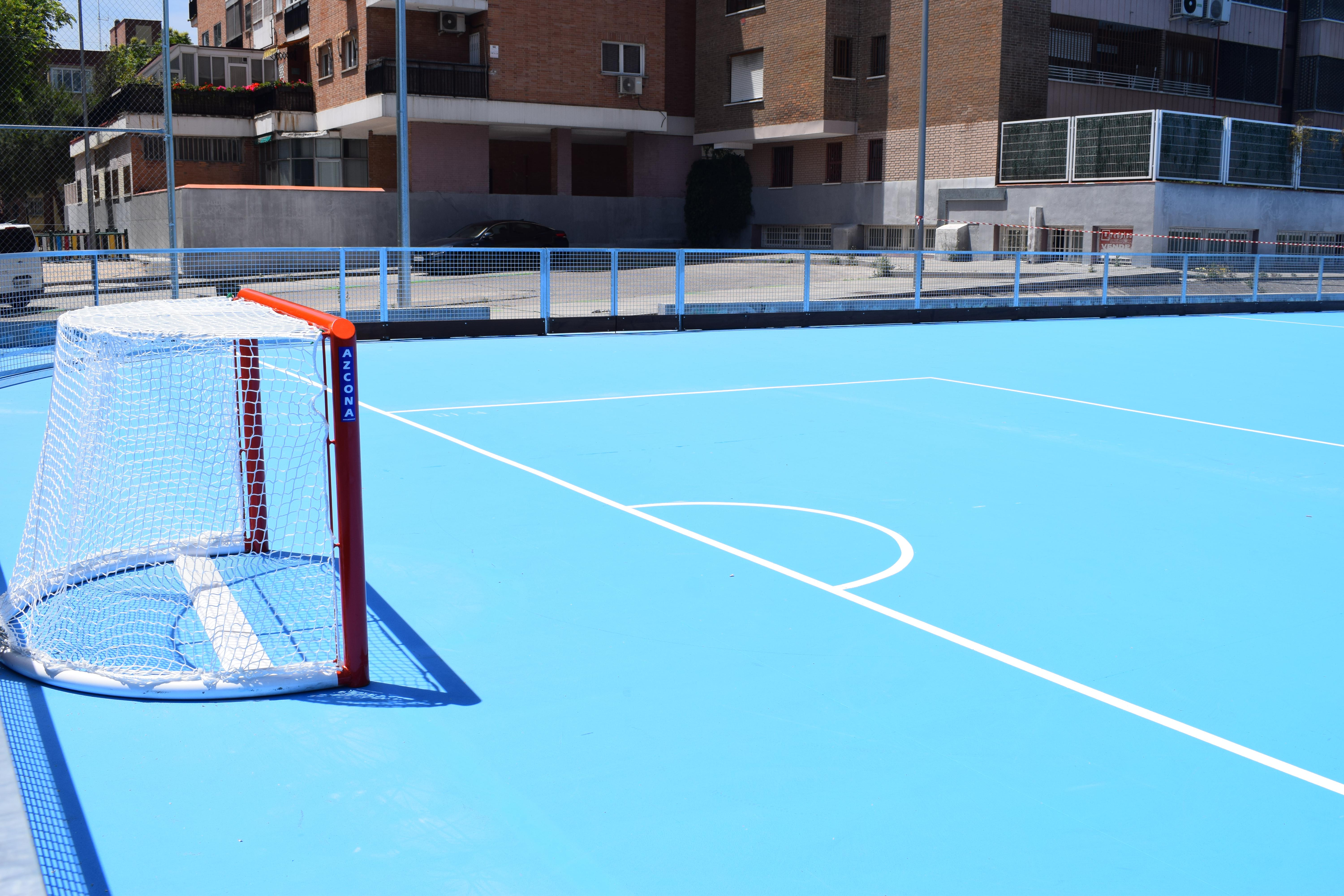
Roller hockey

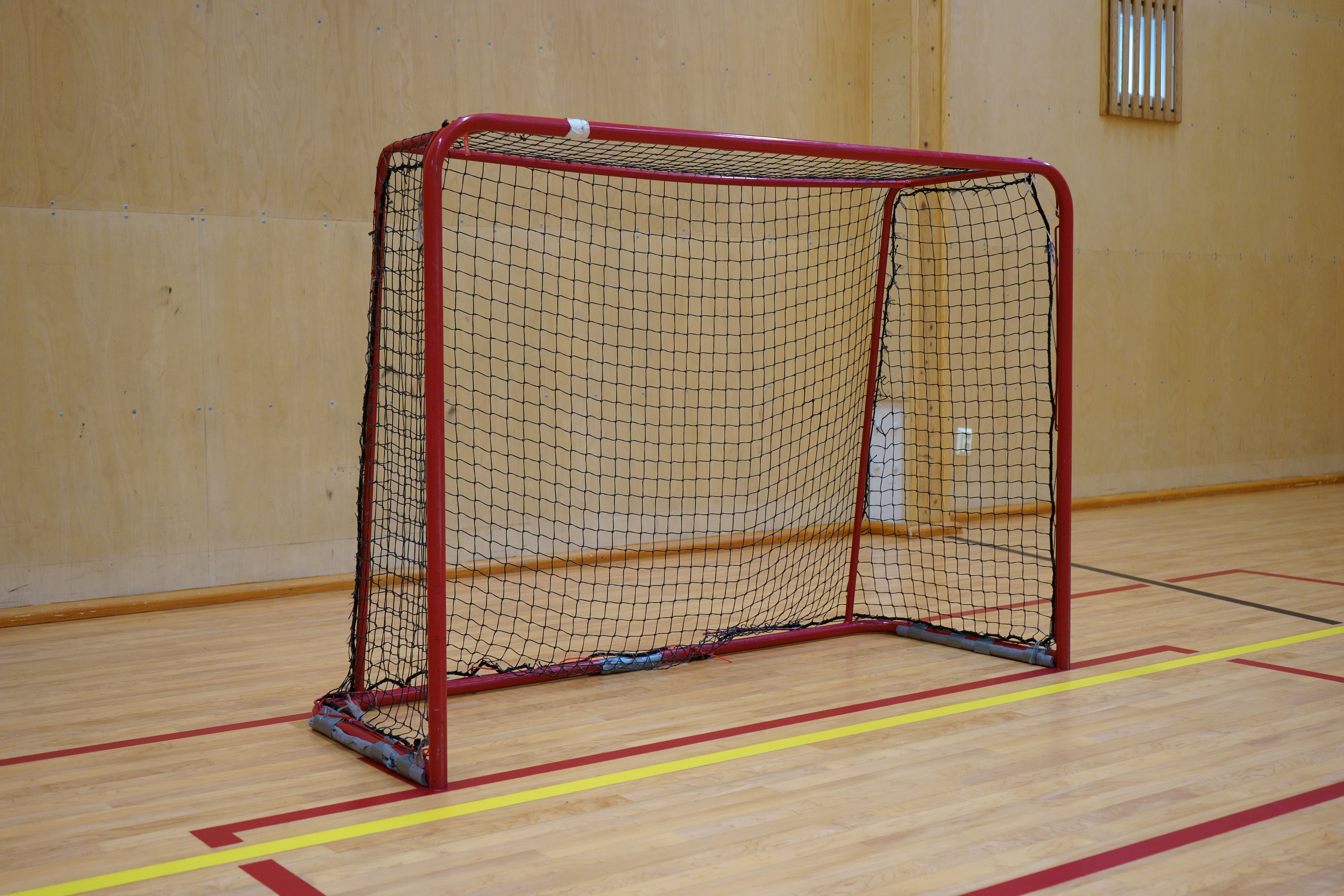
Floorball

=== Ball ===
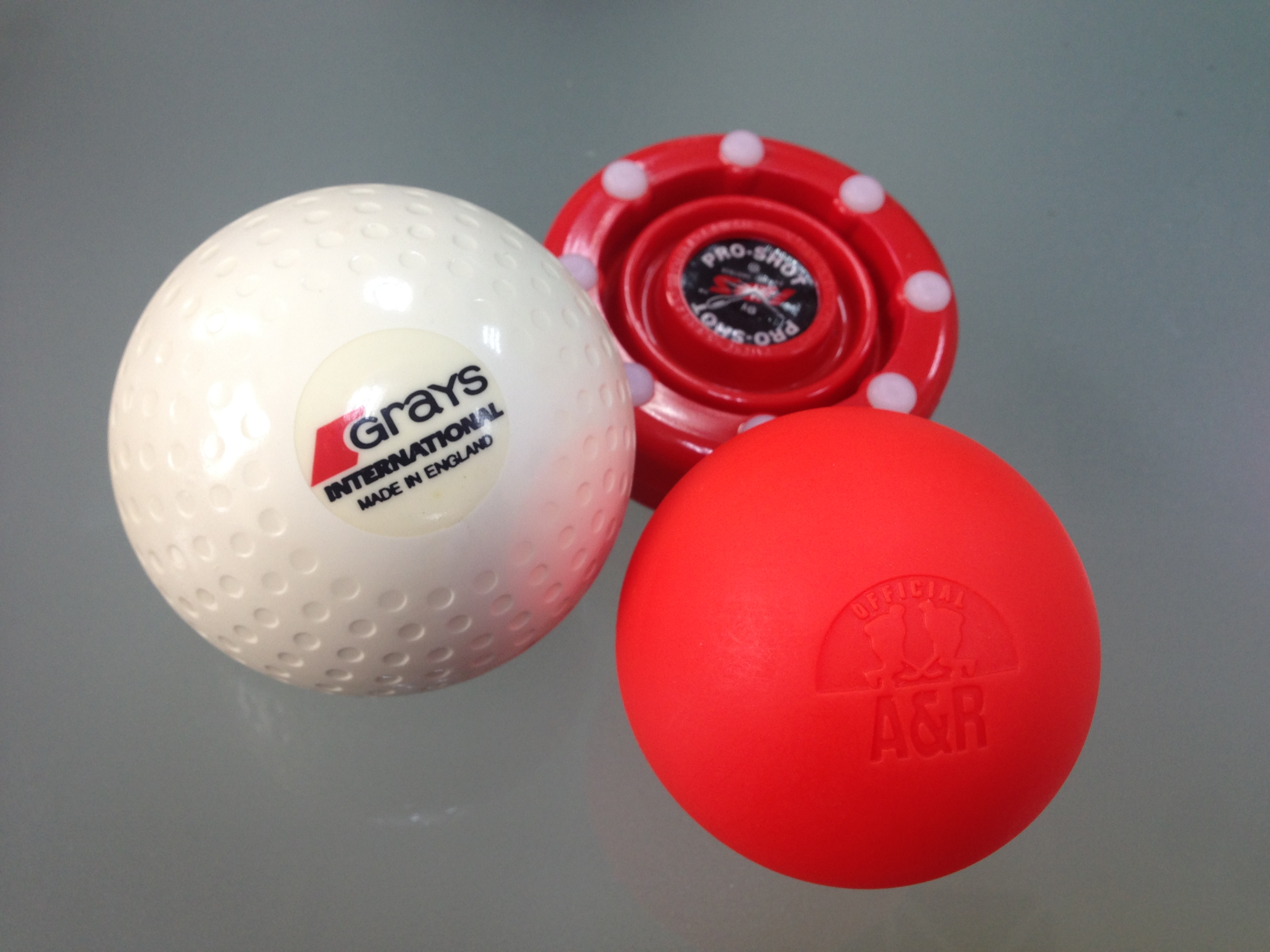
Hockey balls and Inline hockey puck

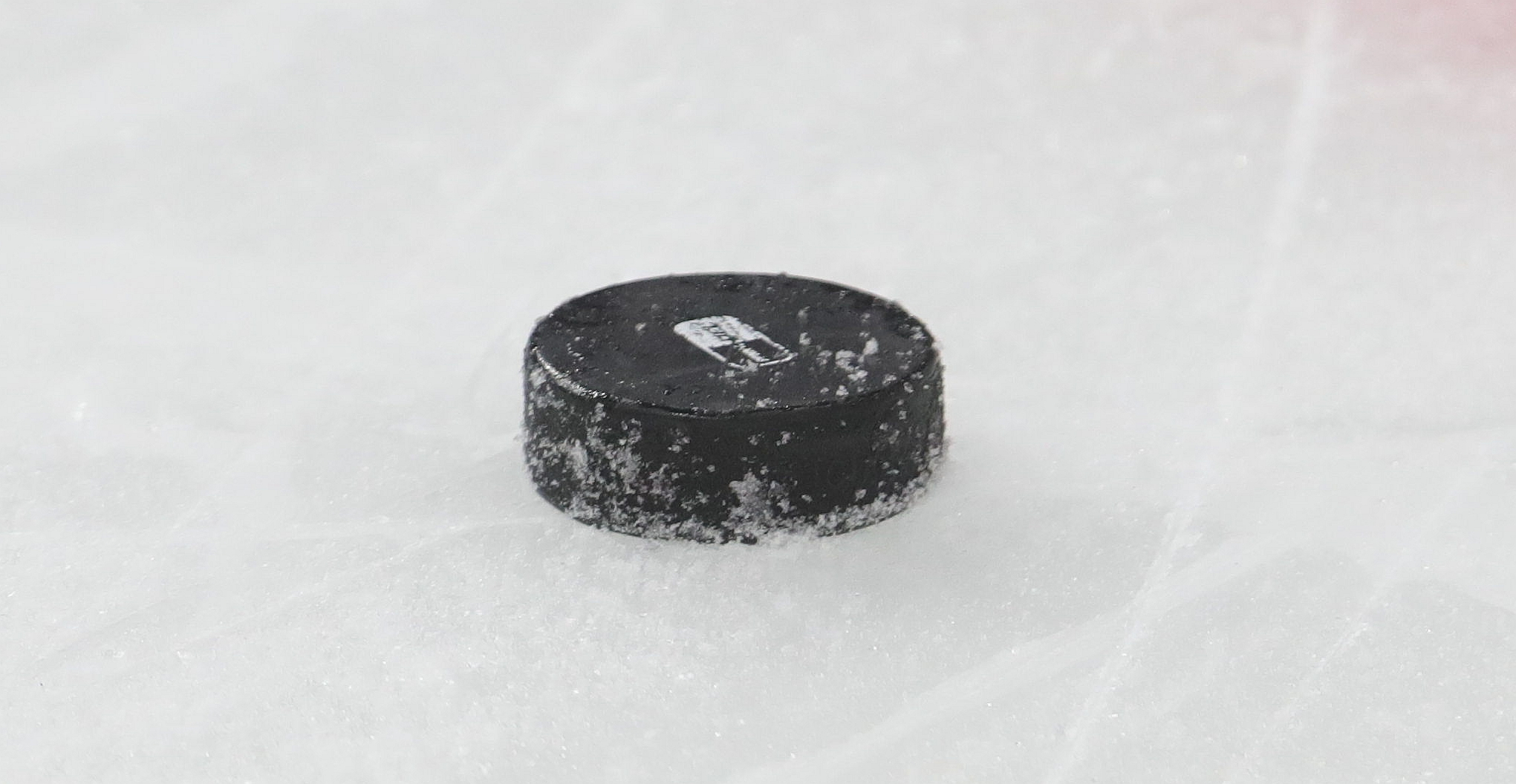
Ice hockey puck

=== Stick ===
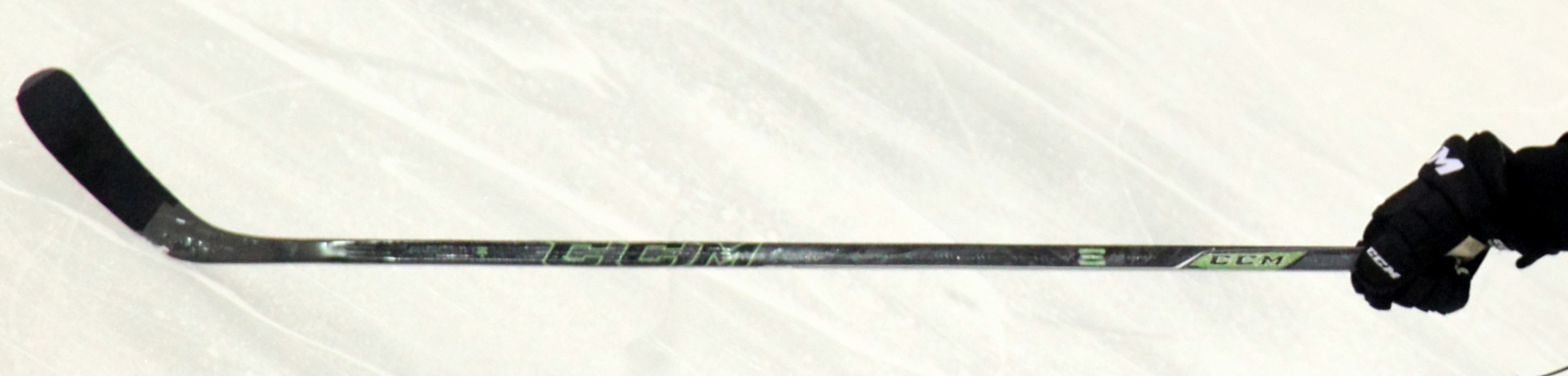
Ice hockey stick

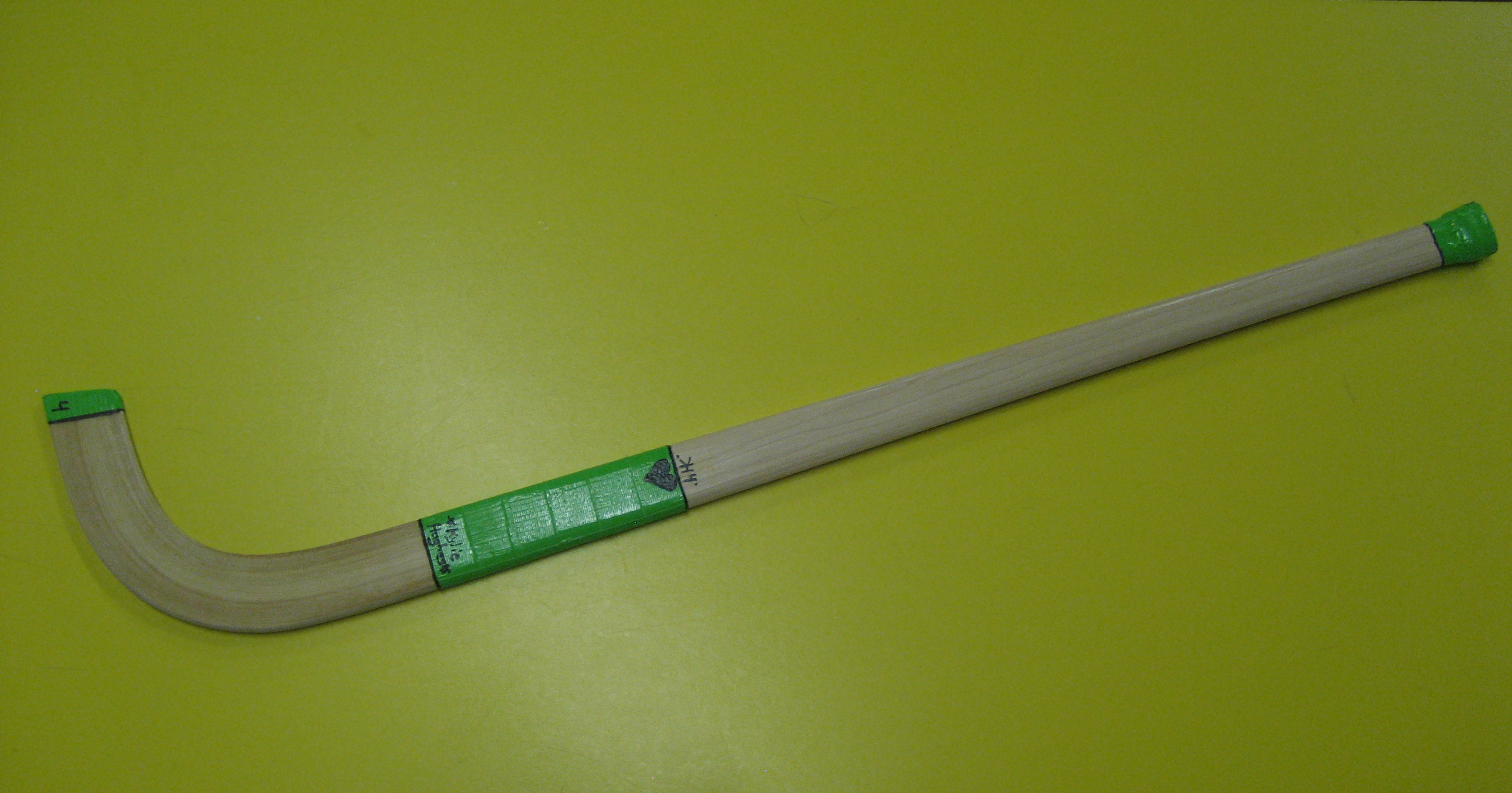
Quad roller hockey stick

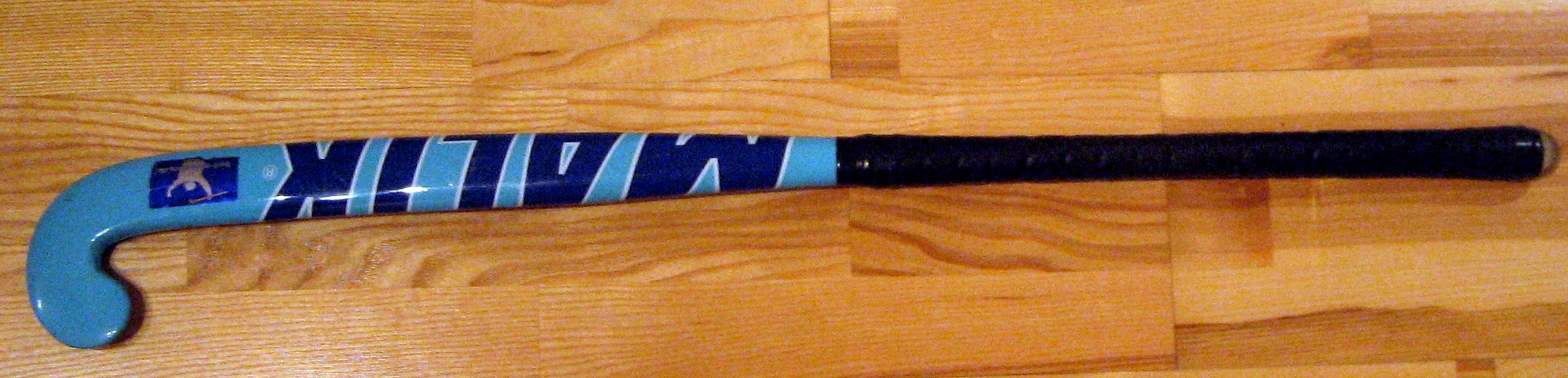
Indoor hockey stick

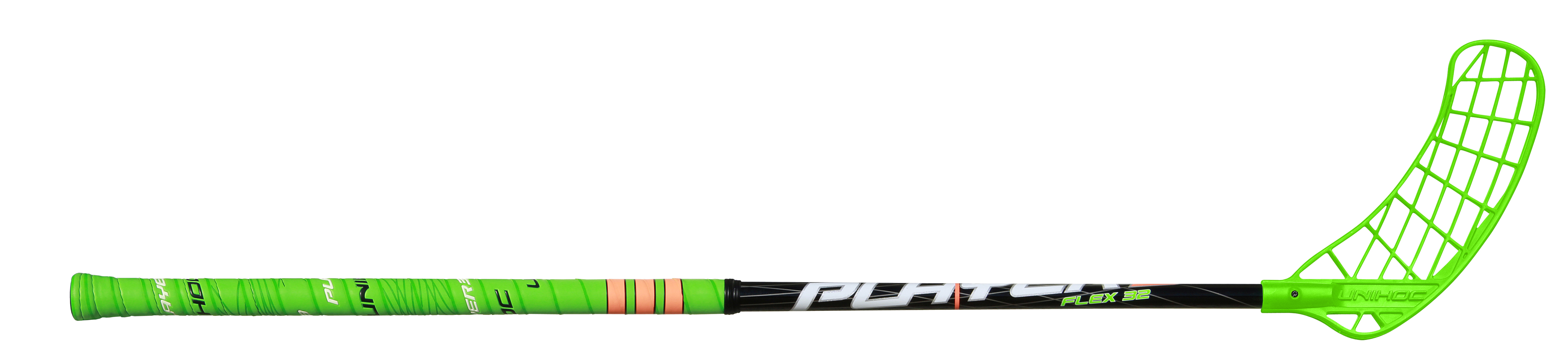
Floorball stick

=== Protection ===
- Shoulder pads
- Genital protection, a jockstrap with cup pocket and protective cup or a "jill" for female players.
- Hockey stick

=== Footwear ===
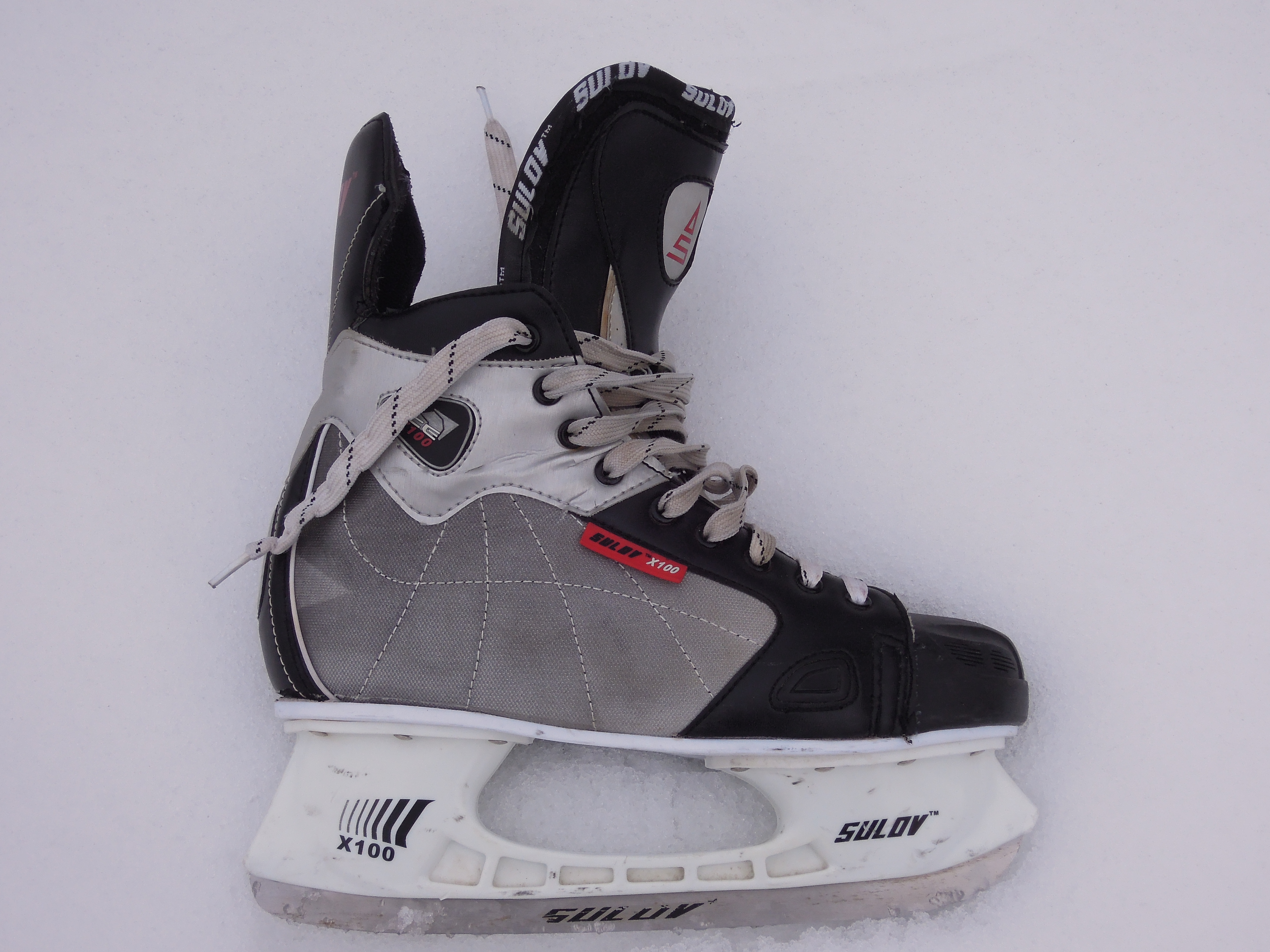
Ice hockey skate

==== Roller hockey ====
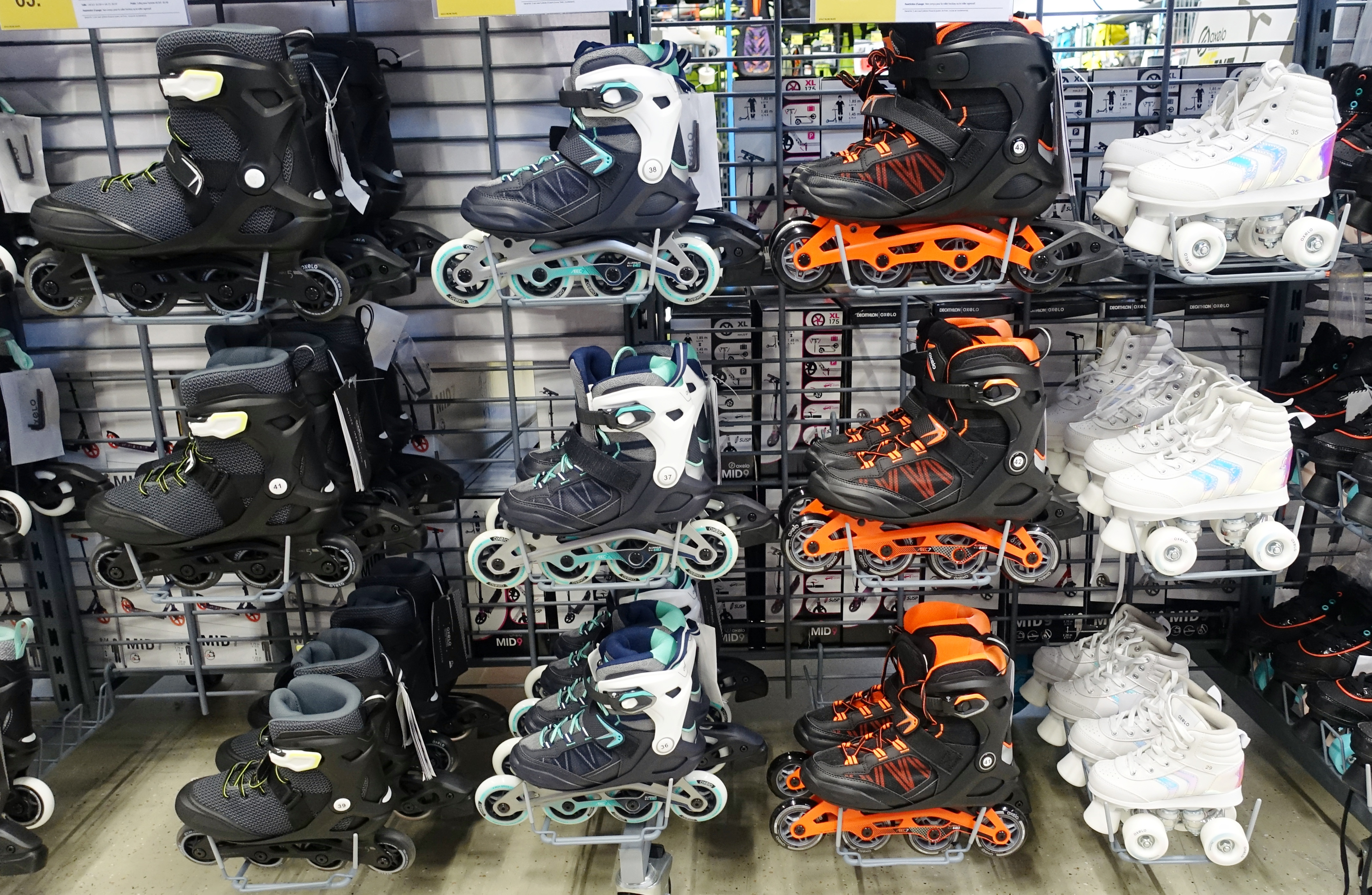
Two available styles:
inline skates and the traditional roller skate

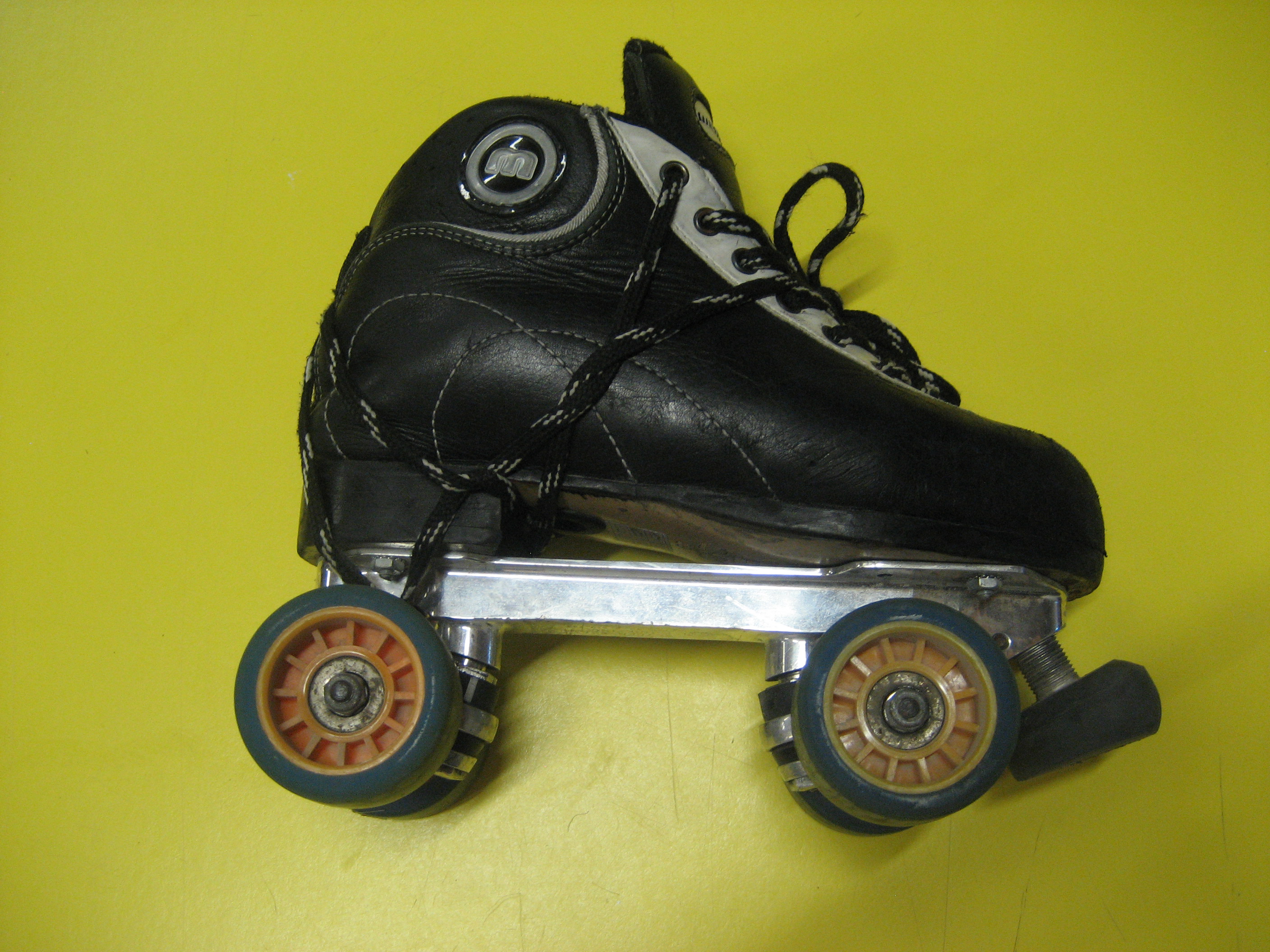
Quad hockey skates

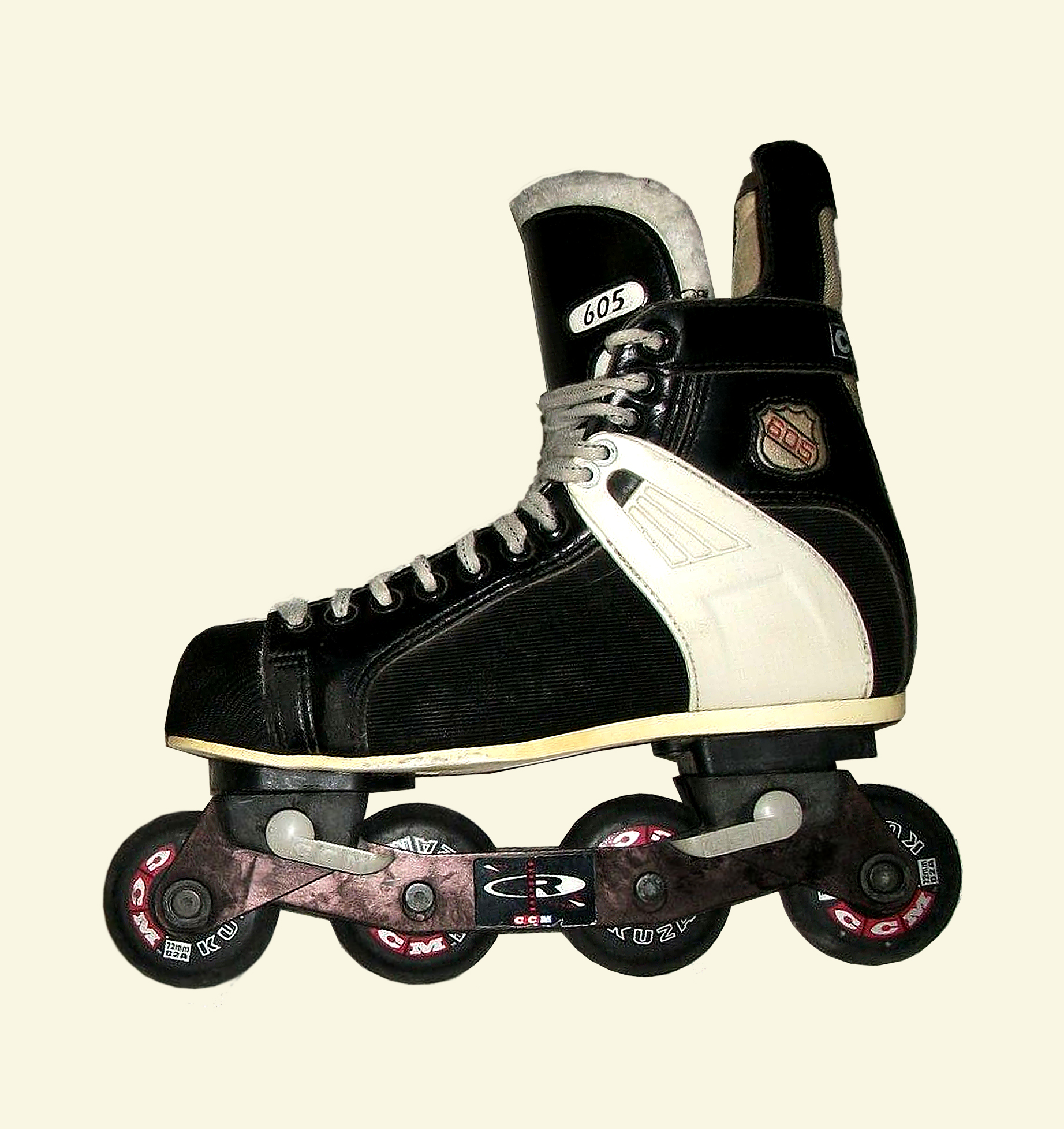
Inline hockey skates

== Main variants ==
Variant			Field			Ice	Roller		Floorball	Ball	Bandy		Unicycle
Variant			Outdoor	Indoor	Beach	Ice	Inline	Quad	Floorball	Ball	Outdoor	Rink	Unicycle
Image													
Country of origin			England	Germany		Canada	United States	England	Sweden	Canada	England	Sweden	United States
Governing Body			FIH			IIHF	World Skate		IFF	ISBHF	FIB		IUF
Pitch	Shape		Rectangular			Rounded rectangular	Rounded rectangular		Rounded rectangular	Rounded rectangular	Rectangular		Rounded rectangular
Pitch	Length		100 yards (91 m)	36–44 meters	30–35 meters	60 meters	131–197 feet (40–60 m)	34–44 meters	36–40 meters	56–61 meters	100–110 meters	45–60 meters	35–45 meters
Pitch	Width		60 yards (55 m)	18–22 meters	20–25 meters	26–30 meters	66–98 feet (20–30 m)	17–22 meters	18–20 meters	26–30 meters	60–65 meters	26–31 meters	20-25meters
Pitch	Barriers		No	Wood, 10 centimeters height	Inflatable, 1 meter height	Boards (1.07–2.4 meters height) + protective glass (1.8–4 meters height) + protective net	Wood or fiberglass, 40–48 inches (1.0–1.2 m) height	Opaque wood, metal netting, plastic, 1 meter height	Plastic	Wood or plastic, (1.02–1.22 meters height) + protective glass (1.6–4 meters height) + protective end zone net	No	Boards: 15–122 centimeters height	Yes
Pitch	Surface		–	–	Sand	Ice	Sport tile, wood, asphalt or cement	Wood, cement		asphalt	Ice		
Pitch	Goals		3.66 meters x 2.14 meters	3 meters x 2 meters	4 meters x 2 meters	1.83 meters x 1.22 meters	1.7 m × 1.05 m (67 in × 41 in)		1.6 meters x 1.15 meters	1.83 meters x 1.22 meters	3.5 meters x 2.1 meters	1.83 meters x 1.22 meters	1.8 meters x 1.2 meters
Equipment	Ball	Type	Solid			Puck	Puck	Solid	Hollow		Solid		Filled with air, non-inflatable
Equipment	Ball	Shape	Sphere			Cylinder	Cylinder	Sphere	Sphere		Sphere		Sphere
Equipment	Ball	Circumference	22.4–23.5 centimeters		45 centimeters	–	–	–	–	–	–		
Equipment	Ball	Diameter	–		–	7.6 centimeters	7.7 centimeters	7.2 centimeters	7.1–7.3 centimeters	6.6–7 centimeters	6.1–6.5 centimeters		
Equipment	Ball	Height	–			2.5 centimeters	30–2.2 centimeters	–	–	–	–		
Equipment	Ball	Weight	156–163 grams		140–250 grams	156–170 grams	120–130 grams	145–155 grams	22–24 grams	60–77 grams	60–65 grams		
Equipment	Ball	Bounce							74–84 centimeters		15–30 centimeters on ice dropped from height of 1.5 meters		greater than 30% of the height from which it was dropped on concrete
Equipment	Ball	Material	–		–	vulcanized rubber	plastic	pressed rubber/plastic			–		
Equipment	Stick	Length	1.05 meters			1.63–1.65 meters	63 inches (1.6 m)	1.05 meters	1.14 meters	1.8 meters	1.27 meters		
Equipment	Stick	Weight	737 grams					450–550 grams	380 grams		–		
Equipment	Stick	Material	Non metallic			Wood	Wood	Wood or fiber	Thermoplastic	Wood, aluminium, plastic	–	Wood	
Equipment	Uniform	For locomotion	On foot			Ice skate	Inline skate	Quad skate	On foot	On foot	Ice skate		Unicycle
Equipment	Uniform	Non protective	Shirt, shorts, skort or skirt			Jersey, shorts, socks	Jersey and pants	Shirt, shorts and socks	Jersey, shorts, socks and shoes	Sweaters, pants, stockings	Shirt, pants, socks		
Equipment	Uniform	Protective gear	Field players: shin, ankle and mouth protection (recommended) Goalkeeper: headgear, leg guards and kickers.		Mouthguard (recommended)	Gloves, headgear with visor, mouthguard, neck laceration protector, shoulder pads Goalkeeper: goaltender mask	Shin guards, gloves, headgear with face protection, mouthguard, elbow pads	Goalkeeper: full head protection mask or a helmet and visor, chest pad, gloves, shin pads	Goalkeeper: face mask	Players: helmet, gloves Goalkeeper: facemask, leg guards.	Helmet, mouthguard, neck protection Goalkeeper: face protection		
Number of players			11	6	5	6	5		6	6	11	6	5
Time	Duration		4 x 15 minutes	4 x 10 minutes	4 × 6 minutes	3 x 20 minutes	2 x 20 minutes	2 x 25 minutes	3 x 20 minutes	3 x 15 minutes	2 x 45 minutes	2 x 30 minutes	
Time	Clock stoppage		Yes			Yes	Yes		Yes	Yes	No	During time out	Yes
Offside rule			No (abolished)	No		Yes	No		No	Yes	Yes		No
Checking			No			Yes	No		No	No	No		No
Face/bully-off			For restarting play (no penalty motivated, not for starting partials)			Starting partials; After goal; After penalties	Starting partials; After time-out; After penalties	Restarting play (no penalty motivated, not for starting partials); After simultaneous fouls of identical severity made by players of both teams.	Starting partials; After goal; Restarting play (no offence motivated); After incidents involving equipment and elements of the pitch malfunction	Starting partials; After any stoppage of play	Restarting play (no penalty motivated, not for starting partials); After simultaneous offences made by players from both teams.		Starting partials; Restarting play (no penalty motivated); Two or more players fall and it is unclear whether a foul occurred.; After injury and the possession of the ball is unclear.
Tournaments	World championship		Yes		No	Yes	Yes		Yes	Yes	Yes		
Tournaments	Olympic		Yes	No		Yes	No	1992 (demonstration)	No	No	1952 (demonstration)	No	No
Tournaments	World Games		No	2005 (invitational)	No	No	Yes	1981–1993, 2001	Yes	No	No		No
Tournaments	Professional leagues		Yes		No	Yes	Yes				Yes		
