= Hockey in the United Kingdom =

Hockey in the United Kingdom may refer to:

- Field hockey in Great Britain
- Ice hockey in the United Kingdom
- Inline hockey in the United Kingdom
- Underwater hockey in Great Britain
