= Box hockey =

Hand game

Box hockey (or schlockey) is an active hand game played between two people with sticks, a puck and a compartmented box (typically 5–8 feet or 1.5–2.4 meters long), and typically played outdoors. The object of the game is to move a hockey puck through the center dividers of the box, out through a hole placed at each end of the box, also known as the goal. The two players face one another on either side of the box, and each attempts to move the puck to their left. If a player succeeds in getting the puck to exit the box through the goal, the player scores one point (or goal). The first player to score the predetermined number of goals wins the game.

== History ==
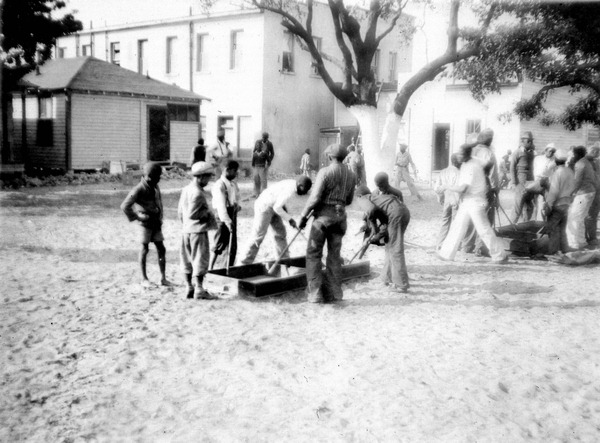
Four-player box hockey being played in Miami, 1935

Box hockey has little known origin, but the game has been around since at least the late 19th century, as described in various game books, such as Games for the Playground, Home, School and Gym (Jessie H. Bancroft, 1913) and 400 Games for School, Home, and Playground (F.A. Owen Pub. Co., 1920).

Box Hockey was listed as the "Game of the Month" as published in the 1914 Volume 2 of the "Recreational helps" by the New York State College of Agriculture Department of Rural Sociology with the following description:

"Box hockey is an excellent active game for picnics camps and playgrounds. It can also be adapted to indoor recreation if the floor upon which it is played is well padded with old rugs to prevent being damaged with the hockey sticks." "Equipment: Take two pieces [boards] of lumber 2 inches by 10 inches by 8 or 10 feet [5 cm × 25 cm × 2.4 or 3.0 m], and two [end] pieces 1 inch by 10 inches by 4 foot [2.5 cm × 25 cm × 1.2 m] and construct a rectangular box fastening it together with spike nails or wagon bed rods. Take another board 2 inches by 10 inches by 4 feet [5 cm × 25 cm × 1.2 m] and nail it into the rectangular frame, dividing it into two equal compartments. On the bottom side of the box, cut a hole 3 1/2 inches at the base and about 2 1/2 inches high [8.9 cm × 6.4 cm] in the center of each of the end boards, and cut two such holes in the bottom of the dividing board, which make the two equal compartments. These last two holes should be equidistant from the sides of the box. Now get a couple of three-foot [91 cm] sticks and an old baseball and you are ready to play. Almost any kind of a stick will do. Saplings cut off underneath the ground so as to get the curve are very good. Also cheap commercial hockey sticks with the blade reinforced with vtirc are excellent."

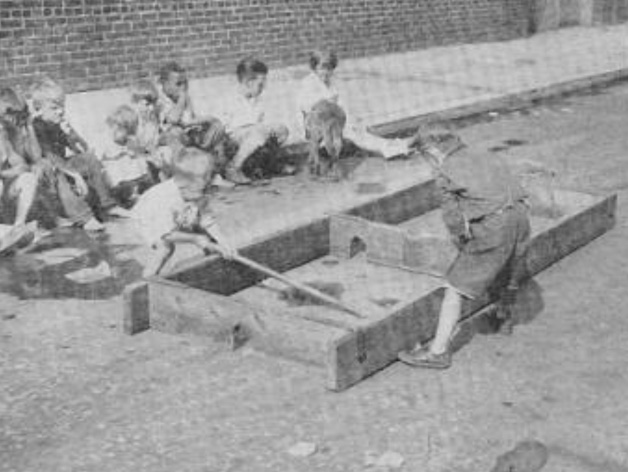
Box Hockey in the streets of Philadelphia 1930

Around 1937, Milton Bradley sold a box hockey game (model No. 4125). By the late 1930s and into the 1940s, it was not uncommon for towns to host youth box hockey tournaments, such as in Reading, Pennsylvania, where the winners of the Essick Playground and Oakbrook were reported by the local newspaper in the July 11, 1939, July 4, 1941 and June 29, 1949 issues of the Reading Eagle.

By the 1950s, Sears & Roebuck was selling a mass-produced version of box hockey for 50 cents. In the mid-1950s adult box hockey clubs in Eugene, Oregon battled for the title "Springfield Box Hockey service club champions".

In the mid-1950s, Larry Best, Director of Recreation for the Milton Hershey School for Boys in Hershey, Pennsylvania (the Milton Hershey School was established in 1909 by Milton S. Hershey), in search of a healthy and fun activity for the students, became aware of the game and introduced it to the students as part of their summer recreation program. Individual play as well as school tournaments were promoted, and Box Hockey is still an active program at the school with almost 75 student homes (approx. 16 students per home) each having a game set today, manufactured by Box Hockey International, Inc.

World Wide Games, Inc. in Delaware, Ohio, manufactured the suitcase-style hockey box in 1965; one is on display at the Elliott Avedon Museum and Archive of Games.

In the mid-1970s to early 1980s, box hockey had a major resurgence in the United States, as a part of the dramatic increase in funding and staffing in municipal recreation and parks departments across the country to reduce youth crime and violence that was prevalent in the late 1960s and early 1970s, by providing activities to keep teenagers active and social.

In 1994, Andy Brody founded Box Hockey International and started to market and mass-produce the larger floor version. This variant of the game features multiple walls with staggered "mouse holes" through which the puck must be passed to reach either goal. Today, many children play the larger floor version in summer camps throughout the upper part of North America, such as Triumphant Life Camp in Larabee Valley, California, Wilderness Northwest on the Olympic Peninsula in Washington state, and Shady Hollow Campground in Brainerd, Minnesota. Box hockey is also used for agility training in hockey schools and camps throughout Canada and the U.S.

Handmade suitcase-style box hockey games are still available at crafts events like the Lowell Folk Festival in Lowell, Massachusetts. Each year they also have a dozen or so set up for playing during the festivities.

== Modern rules ==
- To start the game (and after each goal), the puck is placed under the center mouse hole. Each player raps the bottom of the box with his hockey stick and then taps his opponent's blade, repeating this three times. After the third tap, both players can go after the puck and play begins.
- Each player hits the puck with his hockey stick blade, attempting to move the puck through the holes to his left (see diagram) and out the hole at the end of the box (the goal).
- In addition to advancing the puck towards his own goal, each player can use his blade to block his opponent's progress or to steal the puck.
- It is legal to use the blade to block the goal from either inside or outside of the box.
- When a player succeeds in getting the puck to exit the box through the goal, the player scores one point.
- The first player to score eleven points wins the game.

== Modern equipment ==
The equipment needed to play the game is as follows:

1. Box. Approximately 8 ft long by 3.3 ft wide by 1 ft high (2.4 m × 1.0 m × 0.30 m) constructed with a plywood bottom and three plywood dividers (to create four sections in the box). Each divider has one or more "mouse holes" that are slightly wider than the puck.
2. Two hockey sticks, shortened. Each player uses one floor hockey stick (plastic) whose shaft has been shortened to 12–18 inches (30–46 cm).
3. One hockey puck. A floor hockey puck (plastic, hollow) is the best type of puck to be used in box hockey.

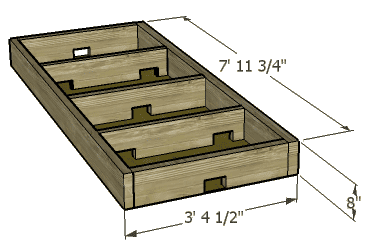
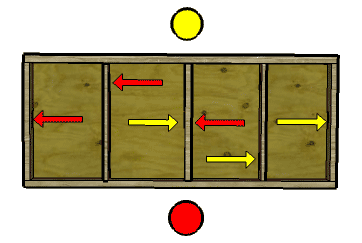
