= Inline sledge hockey =

Hockey sport

Inline sledge hockey is a sport with similar rules to inline hockey, and the same equipment with the exception of a sledge and an additional stick. Like inline hockey, which is essentially ice hockey played off ice using inline skates, inline sledge hockey is played in a sports hall and not on ice.

The sport was invented by British Paralympian Matthew Lloyd, and developed through several organizations including the Hull Stingrays ice hockey team, sports wheelchair manufacturers RGK, the British Sledge Hockey Association, Wheelpower, Paralympians United, and the British Inline Puck Hockey Association. Unlike other team sports such as Wheelchair Basketball and Wheelchair Rugby, there is no classification points system to determine who can be involved in play within inline sledge hockey. The sport is being developed to allow everyone, whether they have a disability or not, to compete up to World Championship level based on ability.

The first games of inline sledge hockey were played at the Veterans Inline Puck Hockey Tournament in Bisley, Surrey, England, on 19 and 20 December 2009. The games were played between the Hull Stingrays (captained by Nigel Wright) and Grimsby Redwings (captained by Natalie Calthorpe).
