= Bisa (name) =

Bisa is a surname and a feminine given name. People with the name include:

== Surname ==
- Acel Bisa, Filipino musician
- Ingrid Bisa (born 1978), Italian politician

== Given name ==
- Bisa Butler (born 1973), American fiber artist
- Bisa Grant (born 1976), American athlete
- Bisa Williams (born 1954), American diplomat

== Stage name ==
- Bisa Kdei, stage name of Ronald Kwaku Dei Appiah (born 1986), Ghanaian musician

== See also ==
- Bisa, disambiguation page
