= Foot hockey =

North American sport

Foot hockey (also known as Hocker) is a sport related to hockey in which the only equipment is a ball, most commonly a tennis ball, that is kicked about the playing surface by the players in an attempt to score a goal on the opposing goaltender. It has been described as a "combination of hockey, soccer and handball" and "a form of soccer with a tennis ball". Foot hockey is played indoors or outdoors; footwear is optional indoors, but must be worn by either all or none of the players. It may be unisex or coed. Participation in foot hockey produced fewer catastrophic injuries than other winter sports in studies from 1986 to 1995.

The game is mostly played in grade schools, and is popular in Canada and parts of the United States. The usual age of foot hockey players can range from 6 to 13 years old. Because it has few requirements regarding equipment and can be played on most hard surfaces, it is more accessible than ice hockey. The game is listed amongst those to keep children interested in playground activities in the 1915 issue of The Playground published by the Playground Association of America. In his book Brian Mcfarlane's NHL Hockey 1984, Brian McFarlane mentions how brothers Joe and Brian Mullen played the game as kids in arena stairwells while waiting for ice time at the rink. Anson Carter's introduction to ice hockey was a game of foot hockey played in his hometown of Scarborough, Ontario when he was a child. Neal Broten played the game in his family's kitchen with his brothers.

A variant of the game, called "Sockey", is commonly played among elementary school children in Southwestern Quebec. Unlike the Ontario version, Sockey is most commonly played on outdoor hockey rinks in Fall and Spring using a soccer ball, designating specific board panels as "nets" and full body contact is permitted. Another variant of the game still called Foot Hockey, is played by children ranging from age 6 to 13. The version is played Southern and Eastern Ontario. The nets are either coats or the patterns among the walls, in this version players are allowed to move the ball with their feet and hands (by throwing it to each other) but must be kicked with their foot. Semi-Body contact is commonly allowed and the goalies commonly use baseball caps as gloves. In the Indian state of Manipur, the game is called Khong-Kangjei.

== Overview ==
There is one net at each end with one goaltender. The common goaltending equipment are jackets that are wore on backwards and untied so the ball does not hurt as it normally would, and in addition it is advantage as it covers up more of the net. Goalies with possession of the ball can throw or kick the ball down the court to one of their players. This sport is often played on asphalt or grass.

== Rules ==
As in ice hockey, the goaltender is an individual who guards the net, in this case a makeshift area whose width is demarcated with available markers on the ground, such as the player's coats or snow piles. The net's dimensions vary but are generally 4 to 6 feet (1.8 m) wide and approximately 2 to 3 feet (0.91 m) high. The goaltender may use a jacket or hat in order to stop the ball. A variation played outdoors is boot hockey, played in the winter when most players are likely to be wearing boots, and is a form of shinny; the term boot hockey also refers to a variant of street hockey.

The rules are a mixture of those for ice hockey or floor hockey and soccer. The primary equipment is a ball, usually a tennis ball, though any suitable object may be used; sticks are not used. Each player may kick the ball, either in an attempt to score a goal by sending the ball past the goaltender into the net, by passing the ball to a teammate, or by advancing the ball into the opponents territory and chasing it. Some variants will forgo a goaltender.

Players are allowed to use their hands to catch the ball, in the event that it is in the air, but are not allowed to pick it up off the ground. If a player does catch a ball, he or she is able to throw or place it on the ground, but only to themselves. In other words, the ball cannot be hand passed to another player, or thrown into the net.

In organised events, helmets may be required, and is recommended by some. The game is considered to be a safe sport.

One of the important rules is interference. If the goalie is kicked or pushed it is an interference and the team which was interfered is granted the ball and is no goal if it enters the net. There are also interferences during out of net play. The common playground interference is when people that aren't playing run into the way of the ball. The consequences differ for this sort of affair from a penalty shot to the interfered teams position. Arguing can be a big matter too. The majority of goaltenders tend to argue about disallowing goals, if it is interference, or them just claiming the ball never hit the net. In this case some will argue so much that the players will use an alternate method and give them a penalty shot. During a penalty shot players can call rebounds or no rebounds. Without rebounds it is an advantage for the defending team. They may also call slides or no slides. A slide is when the goalie charges towards the player taking the penalty shot and blocking the ball with their body.

== Training use by sports professionals ==
For Christmas 2001, Danièle Sauvageau, head coach of the Canada women's national ice hockey team from 2000 to 2002, and video editor Ryan Jankowski prepared a video named Just Smile given as part of a Christmas package to each of the players. Among other events, it documented a game of foot hockey between the players, which was described by Sally Manning in her book A golden tear: Danièle Sauvageau's journey to Olympic gold as a favourite warm-up for the team.

Jim Kelly, a quarterback in the National Football League in the 1980s and 1990s, played foot hockey with neighbourhood children as a child. US politician Tim Pawlenty played a variant of boot hockey as a child.
