= Bisa =

Bisa or BISA may refer to:

- Bisa (name), list of people with the name
- Belgian Institute for Space Aeronomy
- A Swedish nickname for the name Tobias
- The Bissa people tribe of Burkina Faso or their language, both sometimes spelled "Bisa"
- A surname or subcaste name of the Agrawal in India
- Bisa (island), an island in the Obi group of Indonesia
- Business Information Security Architect, a specialized role within the Information Security realm
- Bisa is a nickname for Biserka, a Serbo-Croat name meaning "pearly" for the helmeted guineafowl
- The British International Studies Association.
- Battle Information System Application
