= Elliott Avedon Museum and Archive of Games =

Board game collection

- Established: 1971
- Dissolved: 2009
- Location: University of Waterloo, in Waterloo, Ontario, Canada.
- Website: Elliott Avedon Museum and Archive of Games

The Elliott Avedon Museum and Archive of Games was a public board game museum housed at the University of Waterloo, in Waterloo, Ontario, Canada. It was established in 1971 as the Museum and Archive of Games, and renamed in 2000 in honour of its founder and first curator. It housed over 5,000 objects and documents related to games. It was administered by the Faculty of Applied Health Sciences, and was found within B.C. Matthews Hall, near the north end of the main campus.

The museum had both physical and virtual exhibits about a diversity of board games and related objects. The resources of the museum contributed to the university's program in Recreation and Leisure Studies.

The University closed the museum in 2009 and transferred the physical collection to the Canadian Museum of Civilization (now known as the Canadian Museum of History) however information about the collection, which includes over 5000 objects and a large number of archival documents about games, is still hosted on the University website. There are over 700 web pages of virtual exhibits which includes videos, photographs, diagrams, other graphics, and textual information about games.

== See also ==
- History of games
- History of video games
