= Inline hockey in the United Kingdom =

- Highest governing body: BRSF, BIPHA, BiSHA

Characteristics
- Contact: Non-contact to Full Contact
- Team members: 5 at a time, 4 outfield and 1 netminder
- Mixed-sex: Male & Female

Inline hockey and skater hockey are team sports, similar to ice hockey. In the UK, there are two associations that govern inline hockey. The British Inline Puck Hockey Association (BIPHA) govern the sport with rules using a Puck. The British inline Skater Hockey Association (BiSHA) is different from BIPHA as BiSHA uses a Ball, Inline skates and roller skates and is played to full-contact rules. GBinline, Inline UK and BRHA, are minor association within the country.

The BRSF is recognised by UK Sport, Sport England, Sport Northern Ireland, Sport Wales and SportScotland as the National Governing Body of Roller Sports in the UK, its members include BIPHA, BiSHA, NRHA, FARS, UKRDA and Skateboarding. Clubs and teams who wish to be recognised by UK Sport and the four Home Countries must be registered to one of the members of the BRSF.

BIPHA has nine current regions spread across the UK, regional league winners and runners-up progress to national finals held in Rotherham each summer. BIPHA provide leagues for players at several age groups including Under 08, Under 10, Under 12, Under 14, Under 16, Junior Men and Women, Senior Men and Women and Masters. The association also sends teams to compete in the FIRS Inline Hockey World Championships at Junior, Senior and Masters level and to the AAU Olympics at Junior level held in the United States.

BIPHA has two specific Inline hockey venues. These are used by each of the associations. Simply Skate Arena, in Rotherham, has two small sized pads and is the home venue of BIPHA. Also, the Lord Roberts Centre in Bisley, Surrey, has a similar sized rink. For Regional Leagues, often Leisure Centres are used due to the lack of specific venues.

BiSHA has four current regions and is more popular in the South of the UK with only one league covering the North of England. Similarly to BIPHA, BiSHA holds national championships for league winners and runners-up. BiSHA also sends teams to represent the country, the BiSHA Great Britain team competes in the iiSHF European Championships.

Often, players will play in one or more associations, this is generally due to the lack of players and available teams. Some players will travel to other regions where the standard of hockey may be higher than in their own region.
