= Cycle =

Cycle, cycles, or cyclic may refer to:

== Anthropology and social sciences ==
- Cyclic history, a theory of history
- Cyclical theory, a theory of American political history associated with Arthur Schlesinger, Sr.
- Social cycle, various cycles in social sciences
  - Business cycle, the downward and upward movement of gross domestic product (GDP) around its ostensible, long-term growth trend

== Arts, entertainment, and media ==
=== Films ===
- Cycle (2008 film), a Malayalam film
- Cycle (2017 film), a Marathi film

=== Literature ===
- Cycle (magazine), an American motorcycling enthusiast magazine
- Literary cycle, a group of stories focused on common figures

=== Music ===
==== Musical terminology ====
- Cycle (music), a set of musical pieces that belong together
  - Cyclic form, a technique of construction involving multiple sections or movements
  - Interval cycle, a collection of pitch classes generated from a sequence of the same interval class
  - Song cycle, individually complete songs designed to be performed in a sequence as a unit

==== Albums ====
- Cycle (album), a 1965 album by the Paul Horn Quintet
- Cycle, a 2003 album by Merzbow
- Cycle, a 2014 album by Buckethead
- Cycles (Cartel album), 2009
- Cycles (David Darling album), 1981
- Cycles (The Doobie Brothers album), 1989
- Cycles (Frank Sinatra album), 1968
- Cycles (Redbone album), 1977
- Cycles, a 2021 album by Sam Teskey

==== Songs ====
- "Cycle", an interlude by Beck from Morning Phase, 2014
- "Cycles" (song), a 2018 song by Tove Lo
- "Cycles", a 1968 song by Frank Sinatra on the album Cycles
- "Cycles", a 2025 song by Beach Bunny on the album Tunnel Vision

== Science, technology, and mathematics ==
=== Biology ===
- Cycle (gene), a gene in Drosophila melanogaster that encodes the CYCLE protein
- Cyclic flower, in botany, one way in which flower parts may be arranged
- Menstrual cycle

=== Computing ===
- Cycles, a render engine for the software Blender
- Instruction cycle, the time period during which a computer processes a machine language instruction
- Reference cycle, where a software object refers directly or indirectly to itself

=== Mathematics ===
- Cycle (algebraic topology), a simplicial chain with 0 boundary
- Cycle (graph theory), a nontrivial path in a graph from a node to itself
  - Cycle graph, a graph that is itself a cycle
  - Cycle matroid, a matroid derived from the cycle structure of a graph
- Cycle (sequence), a sequence with repeating values
  - Cycle detection, the algorithmic problem of detecting repetitions in sequences generated by iterated functions
- Cycle, a set equipped with a cyclic order
  - Necklace (combinatorics), an equivalence classes of cyclically ordered sequences of symbols modulo certain symmetries
- Cyclic (mathematics), a list of mathematics articles with "cyclic" in the title
- Cyclic group, a group generated by a single element
- Cyclic permutation, a basic permutation (all permutations are products of cycles)

=== Other uses in science and technology ===
- Cycle (angular unit), a unit of plane angle
- Cycle (rotational unit), a unit of number of rotations
- Charge cycle, charging and discharging a rechargeable battery
- Thermodynamic cycle, a sequence of processes that transfer heat and work into and out of a system
- Wave cycle, the repeatable part of a periodic wave
- Cyclic, a primary flight control for helicopters
- Cyclic compound
- Cycle in cycle per second, which is a unit of frequency (rate of repetition)
  - A period in alternating current

== Vehicles ==
- Bicycle
- Motorcycle
- Quadricycle
- Tricycle
- Unicycle

== Other uses ==
- Cycling, a sport
- Cycle (baseball), a single, double, triple, and home run (in any order) by the same player in one game
- Cycle, North Carolina, a community in the United States
- Cycle Brand, an incense brand of NR Group
- Cyclic color scheme, for coloring periodic data

== See also ==
- Frequency (disambiguation)
- List of cycles
- Periodicity (disambiguation)
- The Cycle (disambiguation)
