= Dustin Kelm =

American unicyclist

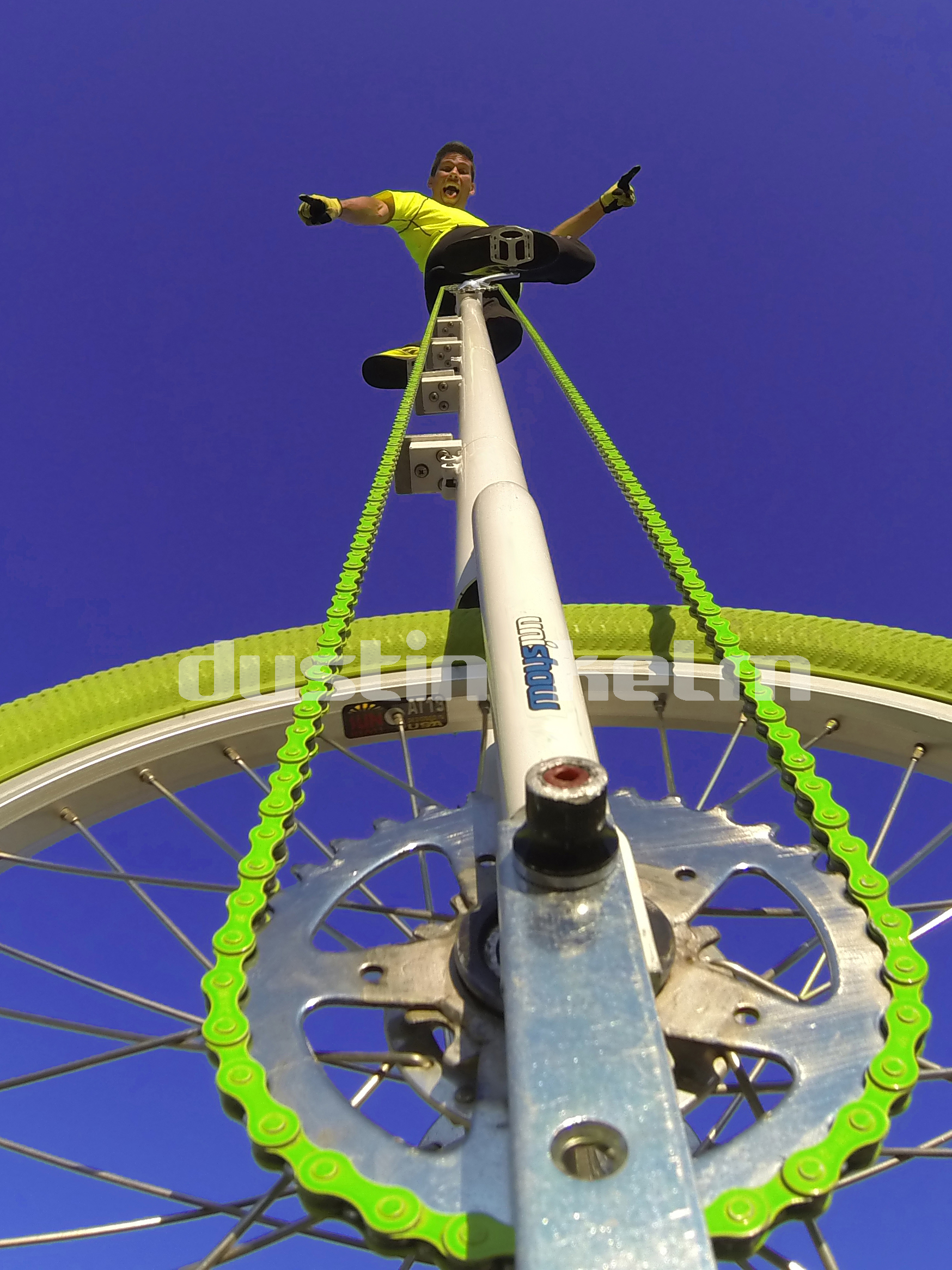
- Born: January 26, 1972 (age 54)
- Awards: World Champion; 1998 Men's Expert Freestyle – International Unicycle Federation
- Website: unishow.org

Dustin Kelm is a professional world champion and world record setting unicyclist, performing the UniShow around the world. He has performed and competed throughout North, South and Central America, Europe, Asia, Africa and the Caribbean. Dustin is a three time Unicycling Society of America expert freestyle national champion, a Unicycling Society of America mountain unicycling national champion and a UNICON freestyle World Champion.

He was born January 26, 1972, and was given his first unicycle at the age of 10. Two years later he joined the Twin Cities Unicycle Club in Minneapolis and discovered there was much more he could do on a unicycle besides his paper route. Over the years he has claimed national and world records, titles and medals in age group categories as well as men's expert categories.

Dustin was elected to serve on the board of directors for the Unicycling Society of America for two three year terms (1989–1991, 1993–1995).

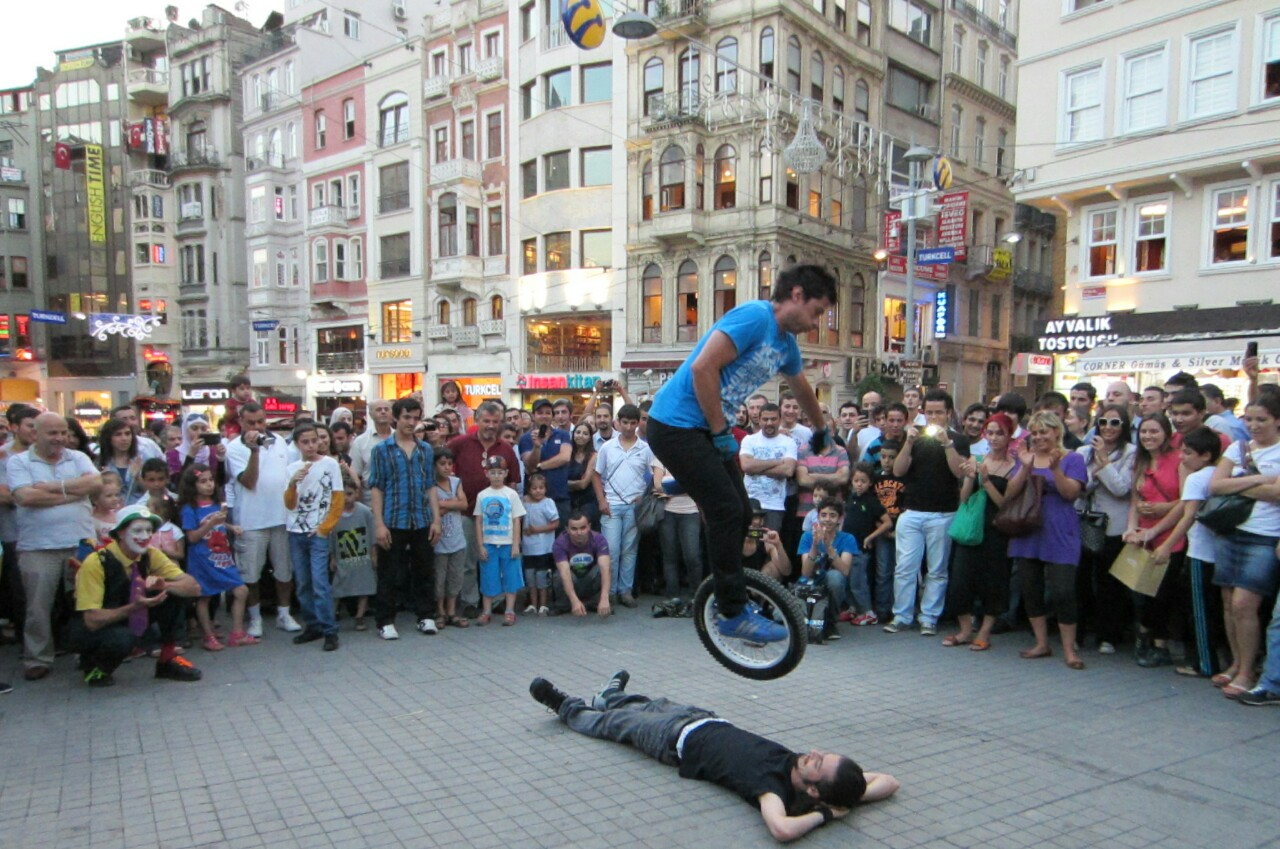
Dustin Kelm street performing on Istiklal Avenue in Istanbul, Turkey

== International and USA National Awards and Titles ==
1986 Bowling Green, Ohio - Unicycling Society of America National Unicycle Convention

- 1st Place Age Group 13-14 Male (55 Points)
- Individual Standard Class 1st Place 13-14 Male (52.00)
- Artistic Riding Couples 3rd Place 15-16 Male (47.66)
- 100m 1st Place 13-14 Male (0:17.67)
- 200m 1st Place 13-14 Male (0:34.74)
- 1600m 1st Place 13-14 Male (5:15:32)
- 50m One-footed Race 1st Place 13-14 Male and Unicycling Society of America National Unicycle Convention Age Group Record (0:10.31)
- Backwards 50m Race 1st Place 13-14 Male (0:12.78)
- Slow Race 1st Place 13-14 Male (0:11.96)
- Obstacle Course 2nd Place 13-14 Male (0:24.47)
- Relay 2nd Place 13-16 Male
- Wheel Walk 1st Place 13-14 Male (0:04.79)

1987 Arden Hills, Minnesota - Unicycling Society of America National Unicycle Convention

- Overall Race Trophy 15-16 Male (35 Points)
- 100m 1st Place 15-16 Male (0:16.53)
- 200m 1st Place 15-16 Male (0:34.50)
- 1600m 1st Place 15-16 Male (5:04.38)
- Obstacle Course 1st Place 15-16 Male (0:25.07)
- One-footed 50m Race 1st Place 15-16 Male (0:09.70)
- Backwards 50m Race 1st Place 15-16 Male (0:11.31)
- Forward Slow 10m Race 1st Place 15-16 Male (0:27.10)
- Ultimate Wheel 10m Race World Champion and 1st Place 15-16 Male (0:03.85)
- Individual Trick Riding 2nd Place 15-16 Male

1988 Ypsilanti, Michigan - Unicycling Society of America National Unicycle Convention

- Artistic Riding Open Class 1st Place 15-16 Male
- Artistic Riding Couples 2nd Place 17-18 Male
- 100m 1st Place 15-16 Male (0:16.24)
- 1600m 1st Place 15-16 Male (5:02.00)
- Obstacle Course 2nd Place 15-16 Male
- One-footed Race 1st Place 15-16 Male (0:10.03)
- Forward Slow Race 1st Place 15-16 Male (0:15.27)
- Backward Slow Race 1st Place 15-16 Male (0:15.68)
- Wheel Walk 2nd Place 15-16 Male

1989 Mobile, Alabama - Unicycling Society of America National Unicycle Convention

- Over-all High Point Winner 17-18 Male
- 200m 1st Place 17-18 Male and Unicycling Society of America National Unicycle Convention Age Group Record (0:31.13)
- 1600m 1st Place 17-18 Male, Unicycling Society of America National Unicycle Convention Age Group Record and World Record (4:46.44)
- Ultimate Wheel 25m National Champion and World Record (0:06.86)

1990 Findlay, Ohio - Unicycling Society of America National Unicycle Convention

- Artistic Riding Open Class 1st Place 17-18 Male
- Artistic Riding Couples 1st Place 19-29 Male
- Over-all High Point Winner 17-18 Male
- 100m 1st Place 17-18 Male and Unicycling Society of America National Unicycle Convention Age Group Record (0:15.32)
- 200m 1st Place 17-18 Male (0:33.88)
- 1600m 1st Place 17-18 Male (4:48.74)
- Obstacle Course 1st Place 17-18 Male (0:23.27)
- Forward Slow Race 1st Place 17-18 Male (0:30.52)
- Ultimate Wheel 1st Place 17-18 Male (0:07.29)
- Wheel Walk 1st Place 17-18 Male(0:09.41)

1991 Chariton, Iowa - Unicycling Society of America National Unicycle Convention

- Men's Expert Freestyle 2nd Place

1992 Saint Paul, Minnesota - Unicycling Society of America National Unicycle Convention

- Over-all High Point Winner Expert Male

1992 Quebec, Canada - UNICON VI

- Downhill Gliding World Champion (0:47.9)

1994 Wahpeton, North Dakota - Unicycling Society of America National Unicycle Convention

- Backwards Slow Race National Champion Expert Male and Unicycling Society of America National Unicycle Convention Age Group Record (0:26.03)

1994 Minneapolis, Minnesota - UNICON VII

- Obstacle Course 2nd Place 19-29 Male (0:22:92)
- Obstacle Course 3rd Place Expert Male (0:22:92)
- Backward Slow Race 1st Place 19-29 Male (0:33:86)
- Backward Slow Race World Champion Expert Male and International Unicycle Federation World Record (0:33:86)
- Forward Slow Race 1st Place 19-29 Male (0:35:61)
- Forward Slow Race 2nd Place Expert Male (0:35:61)
- Backward Slow Race World Champion Expert Male (0:33:86)
- Ultimate Wheel 30m 1st Place 19-29 Male (0:07:90)
- Ultimate Wheel 30m World Champion Expert Male (0:07:90)
- Wheel Walk Race 2nd Place 19-29 Male (0:08:00)
- Gliding 2nd Place Expert Male (20.06m)

1995 Bowling Green, Ohio - Unicycling Society of America National Unicycle Convention

- Overall Racing Expert Male 3rd Place
- 100m 2nd Place 19-29 Male (0:16.15)
- 200 3rd Place Expert Male (0:32.09)
- 200 1st Place 19-29 Male (0:32.02)
- 400m 2nd Place Expert Male (1:08.38)
- 400m 1st Place 19-29 Male (1:12.26)
- Obstacle Course 2nd Place 19-29 Male (0:23.43)
- One-footed Race 2nd Place 19-29 Male (0:09.99)
- Backward Slow 10m Race 1st Place 19-29 Male (0:32.33)
- Backward Slow 10m Race National Champion Expert Male and Unicycling Society of America National Unicycle Convention Overall Record (0:32.33)
- Forward Slow Race 3rd Place Expert Male (0:29.34)
- Forward Slow Race 1st Place 19-29 Male (0:29.34)
- Ultimate Wheel 30m National Champion Expert Male (0:08.32)
- Ultimate Wheel 30m 1st Place 19-29 Male (0:08.32)
- Wheel Walk Race 1st Place 19-29 Male (0:12.55)
- Height Hopping 1st Place 19-29 Male (.356m)

1996 Chariton, Iowa - Unicycling Society of America National Unicycle Convention

- Men's Expert Freestyle National Champion
- 100m 3rd Place Expert Male (0:15.53)
- 100m 2nd Place 19-29 Male (0:15.54)
- 200m 2nd Place 19-29 Male (0:32.53)
- 400m 2nd Place 19-29 Male (1:05.66)
- 1600m 2nd Place Expert Male (4:44.40)
- 1600m 2nd Place 19-29 Male (4:44.40)
- Coasting Distance Event 2nd Place Expert Male (47.80m)
- Coasting Distance Event 1st Place 19-29 Male (47.80m)
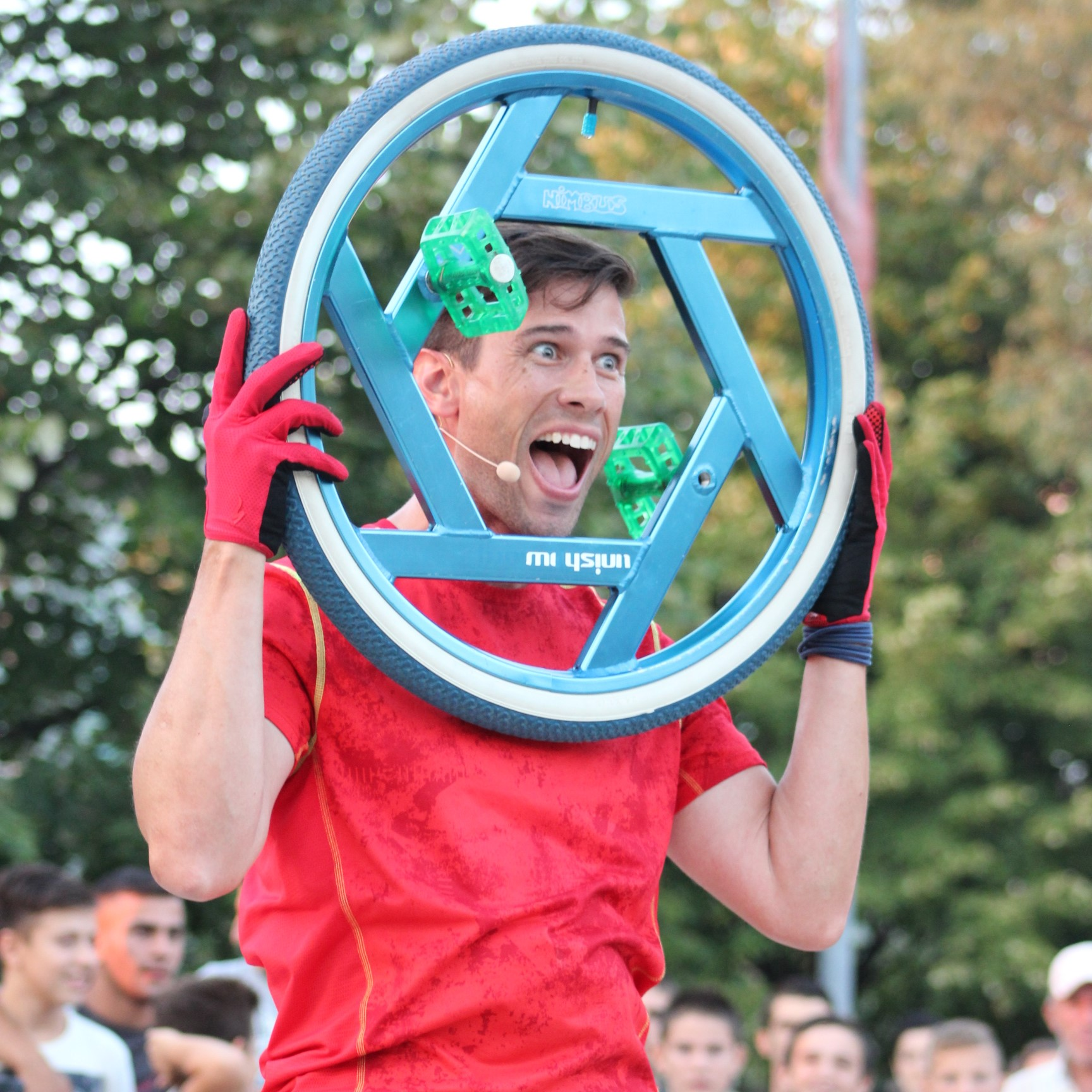
  Dustin Kelm Albania UniShow
- Obstacle Course 3rd Place Expert Male (0:23.35)
- Obstacle Course 2nd Place 19-29 Male (0:23.35)
- One-footed Race 2nd Place 19-29 Male (0:10.64)
- Backward Slow Race 2nd Place Expert Male (0:29.21)
- Backward Slow Race 1st Place 19-29 Male (0:29.21)
- Forward Slow Race 1st Place 19-29 Male (0:24.05)
- Ultimate Wheel Race National Champion Expert Male (0:07.36)
- Ultimate Wheel Race 1st Place 19-29 Male (0:07.36)
- Wheel Walk Race 3rd Place Expert Male (0:10.14)
- Wheel Walk Race 1st Place 19-29 Male (0:12.29)

1997 St. Paul, Minnesota - Unicycling Society of America National Unicycle Convention

- Artistic Freestyle 2nd Place Expert Male
- Artistic Pairs Freestyle 2nd Place Expert
- Coasting Distance Event 2nd Place Expert Male (66.09m)
- Coasting Distance Event 1st Place 19-29 Male (66.09m)

1998 Monrovia, California - Unicycling Society of America National Unicycle Convention

- Men's Expert Freestyle National Champion
- Mountain Unicycling National Champion Expert Male
- Mountain Unicycling 1st Place 19-29 Male
- 1600m 3rd Place Expert Male (4:48.14)
- 1600m 3rd Place 19-29 Male (4:48.14)
- Coasting Distance Event 3rd Place Expert Male (52.61m)
- Coasting Distance Event 2nd Place 19-29 Male (52.61m)
- Obstacle Course 3rd Place 19-29 Male (0:24.78)
- Backward Slow Race 3rd Place Expert Male (0:24.66)
- Backward Slow Race 1st Place 19-29 Male (0:24.66)
- Forward Slow Race 3rd Place Expert Male (0:29.16)
- Forward Slow Race 1st Place 19-29 Male (0:29.16)
- Height Hopping National Champion Expert Male (.50m)
- Height Hopping 1st Place 19-29 Male (.50m)

1998 Bottrop, Germany - UNICON IX

- Men's Expert Freestyle World Champion
- Artistic Pairs Freestyle 2nd Place Expert

1999 Snoqualmie, Washington - Unicycling Society of America National Unicycle Convention

- Men's Expert Freestyle National Champion
- 400m 2nd Place 19-29 Male (1:08.06)
- 1600m 3rd Place 19-29 Male (5:02.30)
- High Jump 3rd Place 19-29 Male (.28m)
- One-footed 50m Race 2nd Place 19-29 Male (0:09.73)
- Backward Slow Race National Champion Expert Male (0:32.45)
- Backward Slow Race 1st Place 19-29 Male (0:32.45)
- Forward Slow Race 3rd Place 19-29 Male (0:29.88)
- Wheel Walk 3rd Place Expert Male (0:10.61)
- Wheel Walk 2nd Place 19-29 Male (0:10.97)
- Giraffe Backward Slow Race National Champion Expert Male (0:17.71)
- Giraffe Backward Slow Race 1st Place 19-29 Male (0:17.71)
- Giraffe Forward Slow Race National Champion Expert Male (0:23.62)
- Giraffe Forward Slow Race 1st Place 19-29 Male (0:23.62)

2002 North Bend, Washington - North American Unicycling Convention and Championships

- 400m 1st Place 30-39 Male (1:07.67)
- Wheel Walk 30m 1st Place 30-39 Male (0:11.22)
- Obstacle Course 1st Place 30-39 Male (0:22.78)
- Backward Slow Race 10m National Champion Expert Male (0:31.80)
- Backward Slow Race 10m 1st Place 30-39 Male (0:31.80)
- Forward Slow Race 10m National Champion Expert Male (0:31.57)
- Forward Slow Race 10m 1st Place 30-39 Male (0:31.57)
- Wheel Walk 30m Race 1st Place 30-39 Male (0:11.22)
- High Jump 1st Place 30-39 Male (.45m)
- Long Jump 1st Place 30-39 Male (1.56m)

2014 Bloomington, Minnesota - North American Unicycling Convention and Championships

- 100m 2nd Place Expert Male (0:17.006)
- 100m 1st Place 30-49 Male (0:17.468)
- 400m 2nd Place Expert Male (1:09.298)
- 400m 2nd Place 30-49 Male (1:10.129)
- 800m 3rd Place Expert Male (2:27.596)
- 800m 2nd Place 30-49 Male (2:31.668)
- Wheel Walk 30m 1st Place 30-49 Male (0:17.162)
- IUF Slalom 3rd Place Expert Male (0:25.190)
- IUF Slalom 3rd Place 30-49 Male (0:25.190)
- One-footed Race 3rd Place Expert Male (0:11.377)
- One-footed Race 2nd Place 30-49 Male (0:11.097)
- Criterium Unlimited 2nd Place 35-49 Male (13:18)
- Time Trial 2nd Place 35-49 Male (51:29)
- 10k 2nd Place 35-49 Male (25:42)
- Marathon 2nd Place 35-49 Male (2:17:29)

2023 Bloomington, Minnesota - North American Unicycling Convention and Championships

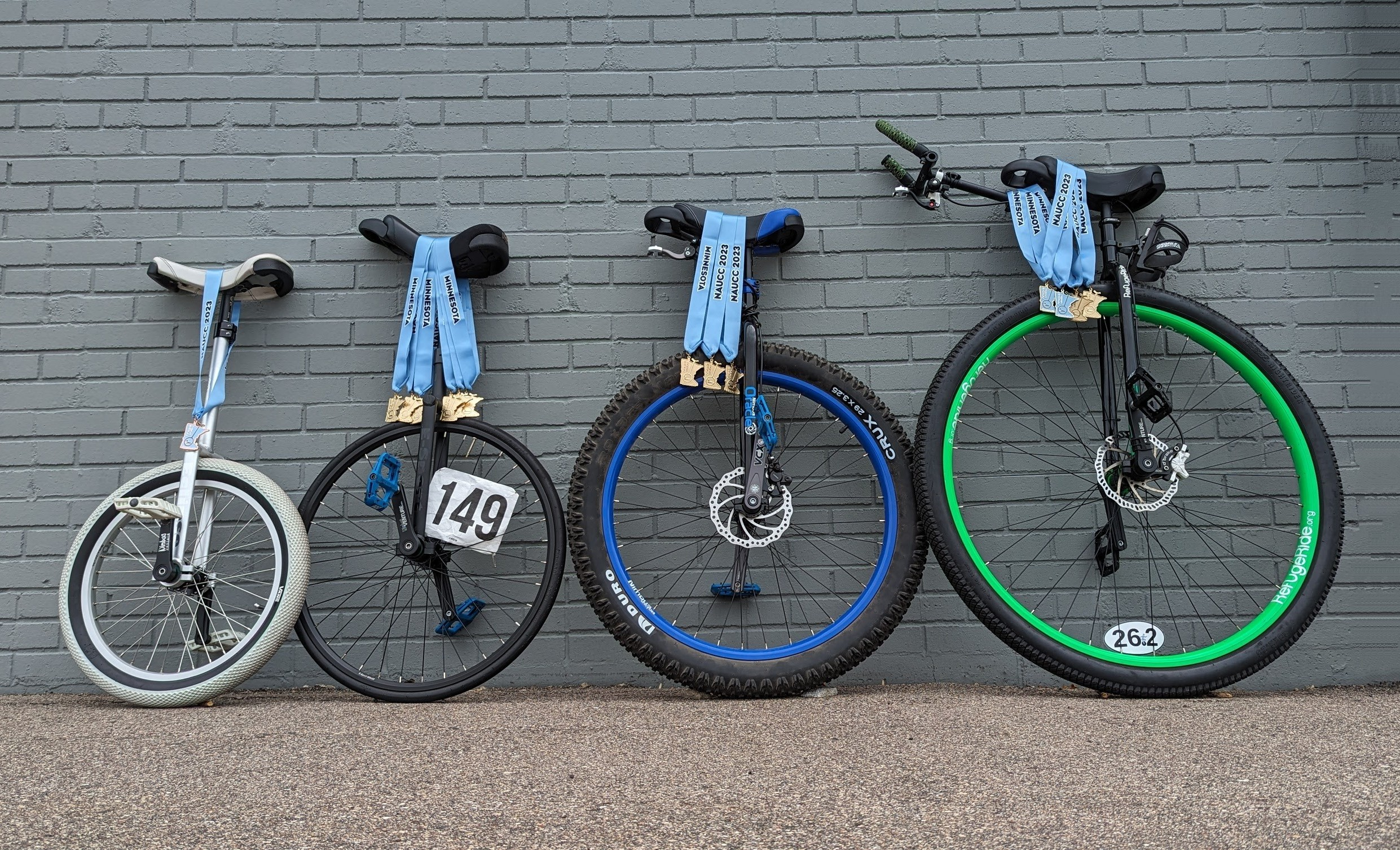
Dustin Kelm's NAUCC 2023 National Championship unicycles thanks to unicycle.com and Nimbus unicycles

- 100m 1st Place 50+ Male (0:18.313)
- 400m 1st Place 50+ Male (1:11.756)
- 800m 1st Place 50+ Male (2:28.864)
- Wheel Walk 30m 1st Place 30+ Male (0:15.888)
- IUF Slalom 1st Place 50+ Male (0:25.431)
- One-footed 50m 1st Place 30+ Male (0:12.103)
- Criterium Unlimited 1st Place 50+ Male (9:59)
- Hockey Team Mutts 3rd Place
- Cross Country Advanced 1st Place 50+ Male (44:18.043)
- Downhill Advanced 1st Place 50+ Male (1:28.135)
- Uphill Advanced 1st Place 50+ Male (1:39.509)
- 10k Unlimited Ungeared 2nd Place Expert Male (25:30)
- 10k Unlimited 1st Place 50+ Male (25:30)
- Marathon 1st Place 50+ Male (1:59:40)
- Marathon 2nd Place Expert Male (1:59:40)

2025 Rochester Hills, Michigan - North American Unicycling Convention and Championships

- 100m 2nd Place 30+ Male (00:18.089)
- 400m 3rd Place 30+ Male (01:12.819)
- 800m Wheel 2nd Place 30+ Male (02:36.601)
- IUF Slalom 1st Place 30+ Male (00:24.239)
- One-footed 50m 1st Place 50+ Male (00:12.745)
- Criterium Unlimited 3rd Place Expert Male (19:52.325)
- Criterium Unlimited 1st Place 50+ Male (19:52.325)
- 10k Unlimited Ungeared 2nd Place 50+ Male (24:25)
- Marathon Unlimited 3rd Place Expert Male (1:47:37)
- Marathon Unlimited 1st Place 30+ Male (1:47:37)
- Marathon Unlimited Ungeared 2nd Place Expert Male (1:47:37)
- Marathon Unlimited Ungeared 1st Place 50+ Male (1:47:37)

2026 San Luis Obispo, California - North American Unicycling Convention and Championships

- Marathon Unlimited National Champion Expert Male (1:56:06)

== Other competitions ==
- 2004 - First place in Collins Cycles Extreme Freeride competition in Eugene, Oregon
- 2008 - Competed in the 800 kilometer Ride the Lobster unicycle race across Nova Scotia, Canada

== RefugeRide ==
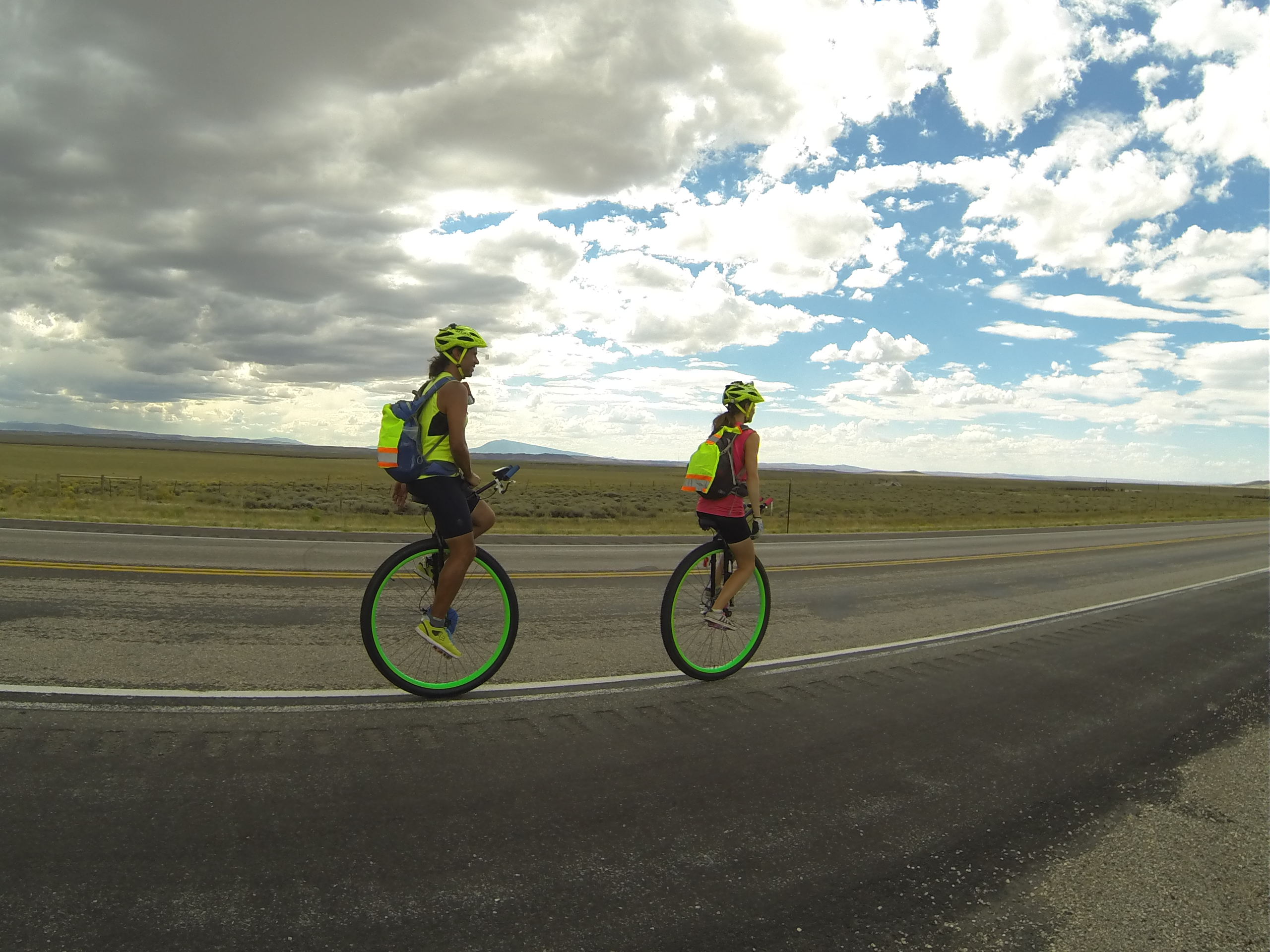
Dustin and Katie Kelm travel through Wyoming on their cross country Refuge Ride to raise support and awareness for Syrian refugees in 2013.

Dustin and his wife Katie accomplished the Refuge Ride from June 21 to October 9, 2013, riding big wheel unicycles coast to coast across the United States from Tybee Island, Georgia to Yachats, Oregon to raise funds for Syrian refugees. In 97 days they rode 3,511 miles (5,650 kilometers) through 14 states, raising over $37,500.

== Media appearances ==
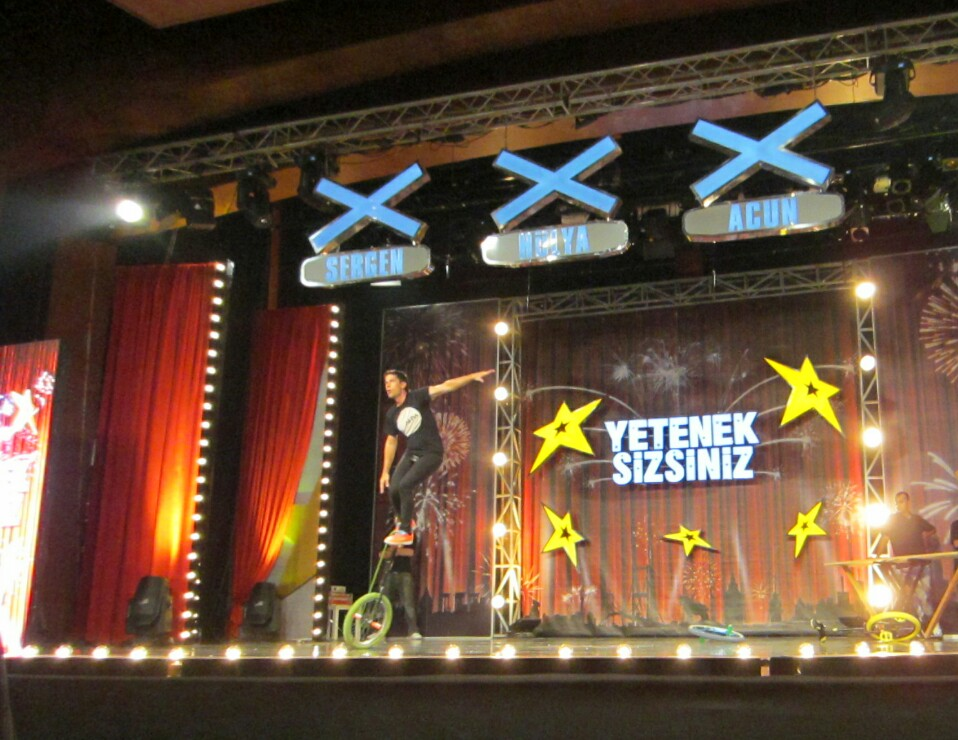
Dustin Kelm rehearses before his first appearance on Yetenek Sizsiniz in Istanbul Turkey.

- ESPN Amazing Games
- Guest appearance in "Defect" extreme unicycling video by Syko Productions
- "Lifeline" Pacific Broadcast Association Asian network feature
- "Introduction to Unicycling" video guest instructor produced by Unicycle.com
- Sat7 broadcast throughout the Middle East of performances/interviews in Egypt and Iraq
- Semi-finalist competitor on Yetenek Sizsiniz Türkiye, Turkey's highest rated TV show and a Got Talent franchise
- The Beyaz Show in Turkey
- Mavi Shaker (Blue Candy) in Turkey
- Berdan Show Channel TRT6 in Turkey
- TV7 Familja 7 Show in Albania
- Lakeland PBS "Unicycling: More Than a Wheel" Documentary
- Numerous other radio, newspaper, magazine and television appearances in the US, Canada, England, Japan, Peru, Paraguay, Kyrgyzstan, Albania and Turkey
