= Wheelman =

Wheelman, wheel-men, or variation, may refer to:

== People ==
- Wheelman (driver), a person who drives an automobile, especially for a getaway
- Cyclist (bicyclist), referred to as wheelmen in the 19th century
- Wiilman, an indigenous Australian tribe of Western Australia, sometimes referred to as "Wheelman"

=== Fictional characters ===
- "Wheelman", the player character in the Driver (series) videogame series
- Wheelmen, a character class in the TV show Machine Robo: Battle Hackers
- Wheelmen, a character class from the TV show Machine Robo: Revenge of Cronos
- Wheelman, a fictional character from the E.E. "Doc" Smith novel Galactic Patrol (novel)

== Arts, entertainment, and media ==
- Wheelman (film), a 2017 action thriller film
- Wheelman (video game), a 2009 driving video game
- "Wheelman" (TV episode), a 1985 episode of Dempsey and Makepeace
- "Wheel Man" (TV episode), a 1993 episode of Renegade
- The Wheel Man (album), 2007 album by Watermelon Slim

=== Literature ===
- Outing (magazine) (1882-1923), formerly called Wheelman in the 19th century
- Wheelmen, a 2013 a book about American cycling
- "The Wheel Man", a story by James Benson Nablo; the basis of the 1954 film Drive a Crooked Road

== Other uses ==
- Wheelman, a penny-farthing bicycle manufactured by Coker Tire

== See also ==
- Cycling, the use of bicycles for transport, recreation, exercise or sport
- Helmsman, a person who steers a ship, sailboat, submarine, other type of maritime vessel, or spacecraft
