= Schlumpf Drive =

Two-speed planetary gear system for bicycles

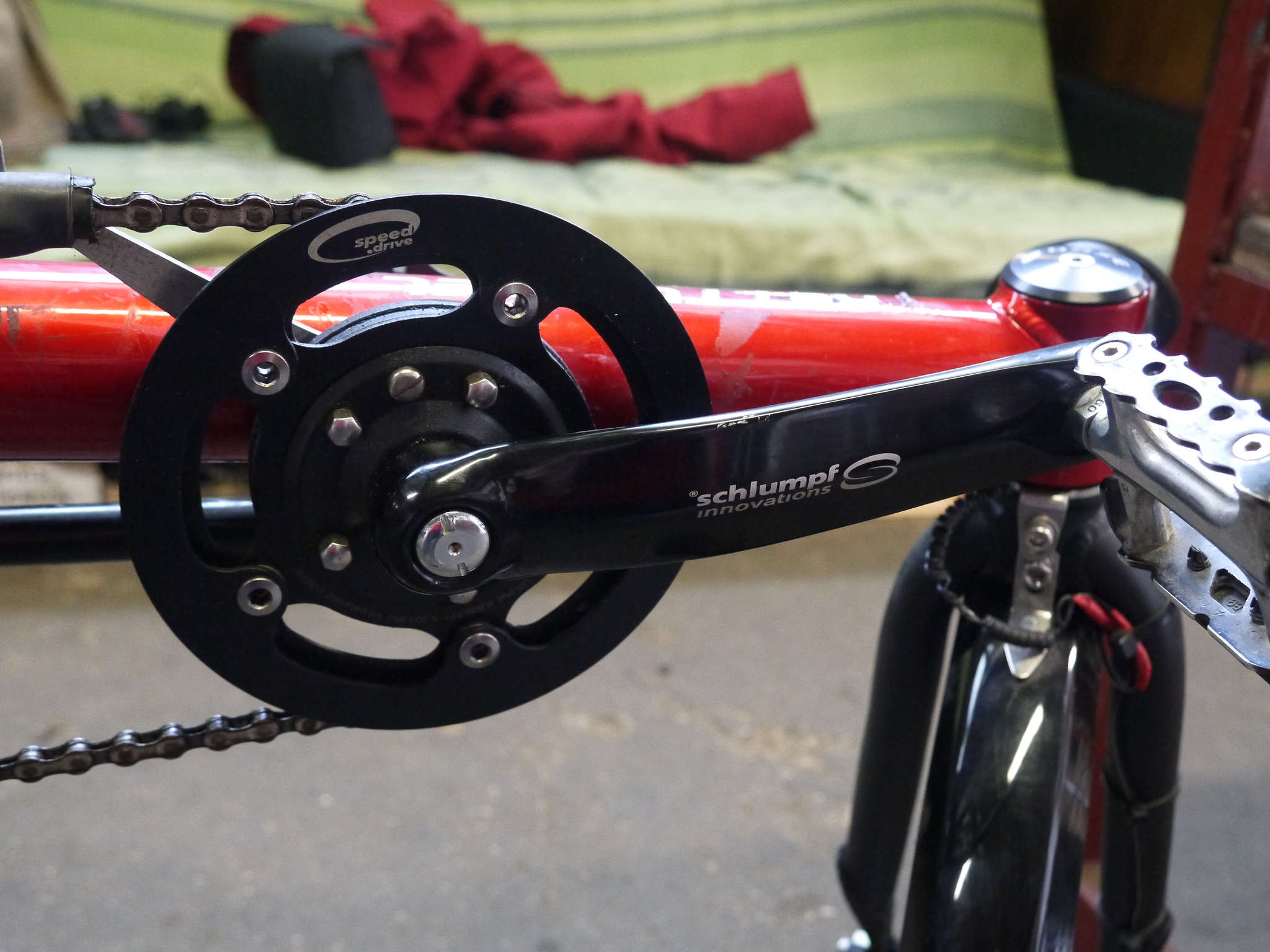
Schlumpf Speed Drive

A Schlumpf Drive is a two-speed planetary gear assembly for use on bicycles and unicycles. It is distinct from other bicycle planetary gear assemblies in that it is located behind the chainring rather than in the rear hub. A push-button on each side of the axle allows the rider to switch between high and low ratios. These are operated by the rider's heel.

Schlumpf Drives are primarily used as an alternative to multiple chainrings. Four models are currently produced, with differing ratios from pedal revolutions to chainwheel revolutions.

- Speed Drive, this allows a 65% increase in the final drive (ratio 1.65).
- High Speed Drive, this allows a 150% increase in the final drive (ratio 2.5).
- Mountain Drive, this allows a 60% reduction in the final drive (ratio 0.4).
- Reha Drive, this also allows a 60% reduction in the final drive (ratio 0.4). However, it is specifically designed for hand-cranked disability vehicles and requires less pressure for shifting.

Schlumpf drives are currently used in some Pashley and Moulton bicycles, and in multiple brands of unicycle, primarily mountain unicycles and unicycles for distance riding.

== History ==
The first Schlumpf prototype planetary gear drive was developed by Florian Schlumpf in 1988 in Switzerland. Production and development were soon established there.

In 2004, the first Schlumpf hub designed specifically for unicycles went into production. Shortly afterward, a collaboration with Kris Holm led to a co-branded mountain unicycle version that bore higher loads and no longer required an external torque lever.

Since 2012, the entire range has been manufactured in Germany by Haberstock Mobility, following an agreed buy-out in late 2011.

== See also ==
- Bicycle drivetrain systems
- Gearbox bicycle
