= Monic =

Monic may refer to:

== Mathematics ==
- Monic morphism, a special kind of morphism in category theory
- Monic polynomial, a polynomial whose leading coefficient is one
- A synonym for monogenic, which has multiple uses in mathematics

== People ==
- Monic Cecconi-Botella (1936–2025), French pianist, music educator and composer
- Monic Hendrickx (born 1966), Dutch actress
- Monic Pérez (born 1990), Puerto Rican model and Miss Universe contestant
- Joseph de Monic (c.1650–1707), military officer and acting Governor of Newfoundland

== Other uses ==
- Monic languages, a branch of the Austroasiatic language family
- Macao Network Information Centre (MONIC), see .mo

== See also ==
- Monica (given name)
