= CYCL =

CYCL or Cycl may refer to:

- Charlo Airport (ICAO airport code: CYCL), Canada
- CycL, an ontological knowledge-based programming language

== See also ==
- Cycle (disambiguation)
- SYCL, a programming model for hardware accelerators
