= Cycle decomposition =

In mathematics, the term cycle decomposition can mean:

- Cycle decomposition (graph theory), a partitioning of the vertices of a graph into subsets, such that the vertices in each subset lie on a cycle
- Cycle decomposition (group theory), a useful convention for expressing a permutation in terms of its constituent cycles

In commutative algebra and linear algebra, cyclic decomposition refers to writing a finitely generated module over a principal ideal domain as the direct sum of cyclic modules and one free module.
