= Monogenous =

Monogenous in mathematics may refer to:

- A synonym for cyclic in
  - monogenous group, a synonym for cyclic group
  - monogenous module, a synonym for cyclic module

== See also ==
- Monogenic (disambiguation)
- Monogenetic (disambiguation)
