= The Cycle =

The Cycle may refer to:

- The Cycle (1975 film), an Iranian film
- The Cycle (2009 film), a Canadian/Czech horror film
- The Cycle (2026 film), a 2026 horror film from Shudder
- "The Cycle" (The Amazing World of Gumball), a television episode
- The Cycle (talk show), a 2012–2015 American political talk show and television program that aired on MSNBC
- The Cycle (video game), by Yager Development

== See also ==
- Cycle (disambiguation)
