= Puerto Rico All Star Unicycling Basketball Team =

Unicycling basketball team

Puerto Rico All Star Unicycling Basketball Team is an American unicycling basketball team based in Puerto Rico. They have represented their country many times internationally. They are 10 times world champions and two times silver medalists.
