= Monogenetic =

Monogenetic may refer to:

- Monogenetic in biology, of or pertaining to monogenesis (Mendelian inheritance)
- Monogenetic volcanic field in geology, a cluster of volcanoes that only erupted once
- Monogenetic theory of pidgins in linguistics, a theory about the origin of creole languages

== See also ==
- Monogenous (disambiguation)
- Monogenic (disambiguation)
- Monogenism (disambiguation)
