= Amy Shields =

American unicyclist (born 1990)

Personal information
- Full name: Amy Shields
- Born: March 7, 1990 (age 36) Ann Arbor, Michigan, United States of America

Cycling career
- Sport: Cycling
- Discipline: Unicycle
- Role: Rider

Amy Shields (born March 7, 1990) is an American freestyle unicyclists. She holds five world unicycling titles and in her home continent she holds over 15 North American titles since 2001.

In 2002 Shieldz defied all odds at the 13th MONDO Jugglefest in St. Paul, Minnesota, where she attained the Guinness World Record for jump roping on a unicycle with an unprecedented 209 skips in one minute. In 2004, in the 12th unicycling world championship, she became world champion in pairs freestyle (with Ryan Woessner) and in female individual freestyle. In 2006, she again became world champion pairs freestyle with Woessner, and she finished in third place individual freestyle.

Shields was the eighth person in the world to pass all ten levels of the International Unicycling Federation.

Besides known as a unicyclist, Shields also is a member of the St. Paul Figure Skating Club, where she has passed both her Senior Moves and Freeskate portions of the United States Figure Skating Association testing program.
