= Cyclic (mathematics) =

There are many terms in mathematics that begin with cyclic:

- Cyclic chain rule, for derivatives, used in thermodynamics
- Cyclic code, linear codes closed under cyclic permutations
- Cyclic convolution, a method of combining periodic functions
- Cycle decomposition (graph theory)
- Cycle decomposition (group theory)
- Cyclic extension, a field extension with cyclic Galois group
- Graph theory:
- Cyclic function, a periodic function
  - Cycle graph, a connected, 2-regular graph
  - Cycle graph (algebra), a diagram representing the cycles determined by taking powers of group elements
  - Circulant graph, a graph with cyclic symmetry
  - Cycle (graph theory), a nontrivial path in some graph from a node to itself
  - Cyclic graph, a graph containing at least one graph cycle
- Cyclic group, a group generated by a single element
- Cyclic homology, an approximation of K-theory used in non-commutative differential geometry
- Cyclic module, a module generated by a single element
- Cyclic notation, a way of writing permutations
- Cyclic number, a number such that cyclic permutations of the digits are successive multiples of the number
- Cyclic order, a ternary relation defining a way to arrange a set of objects in a circle
- Cyclic permutation, a permutation with one nontrivial orbit
- Cyclic polygon, a polygon which can be given a circumscribed circle
- Cyclic shift, also known as circular shift
- Cyclic symmetry, n-fold rotational symmetry of 3-dimensional space

== See also ==
- Cycle (disambiguation)
