= King Charles Troupe =

Unicycle circus act

Logo

The King Charles Troupe (also known as KCT or the KCs; founded as Charles Unicycle Riders) is an American group of unicycling and basketball playing circus performers. In 1969, they became the first known major African-American circus act in modern American circus.

== Early history ==
The King Charles Troupe was created by Jerry King in the Bronx, New York in 1958, "as a community unicycle club that instilled the ideas of Christian principals [sic], character building and discipline to give neighborhood youth an opportunity to become productive citizens." King was inspired by a performance he saw in 1918 of Ringling Brothers Circus, where he witnessed a man ride a unicycle on a highwire. He taught his 6-year-old son, Charles, how to ride a unicycle in the hallway of their apartment building. King started a club, and his students would refer to him as "the Old Man" or "Mr. Jerry." One of King's students, Albert Owens, was on a unicycle when a basketball rolled near him. While still on the unicycle, Owens shot the basketball into a hoop. From there, the first iteration of the King Charles Troupe was formed. Originally called the "Charles Unicycle Riders" after King's son, de facto business manager Bill Minson, a reverend, rebranded the group as the "King Charles Troupe...because it had a showbiz flair to it." They would train by riding on cobblestones.

A talent scout for Ringling Bros. and Barnum & Bailey Circus, Trolle Rhodin, attempted in vain to convince the circus to hire them. Irvin Feld, at the time the producer for the circus, saw the Troupe perform on The Tonight Show with Johnny Carson. He was impressed, and had them audition for him on the sidewalk of Madison Square Garden, subsequently hiring them for the 1969 show as the circus' first all-Black circus act, the same year the circus had hired its first Black clown, Reggie Montgomery. Feld fired several managers who were intolerant of the Troupe on account of the Troupe's race.

== Later history ==
In 1981, the Troupe performed with the magicians Siegfried and Roy in their show "Beyond Belief" at The Frontier hotel in Las Vegas. Siegfried and Roy included the Troupe in a number where they escorted a white showgirl down a large staircase, an act that faced "extreme disapproval" from hotel bosses. It was unheard of to mix black and white people that way. Siegfried and Roy said

For us the King Charles Troupe was more than just a transitional act; we felt they gave our show more body and created an interesting contrast with what we were doing. We had music written especially for the troupe and gave them special lightning. The audience was crazy for the King Charles Troupe and would rock out of their chairs to the rhythm of the music.

In 1996, they performed with the UniverSoul Circus.

In 2006, they performed in the first season of America's Got Talent. They were eliminated in the semi-finals.

In 2015, they joined the Martin Luther King, Jr. Parade in Savannah, GA.

In 2020, the King Charles Troupe was inducted into the Circus Ring of Fame, an award that recognizes people who have made a significant contribution to the art and culture of circus.

In 2021, the Bronx honored The King Charles Troupe with a co-name street ceremony. The street name sign is called "King Charles Unicycle Troupe Way" and sits on the corner of E. 170th St. and Clinton Ave in the Bronx, NY. 1400 Clinton Ave is where Jerry King, wife Alma King, and son, Charles King all lived.

As of 2023, the group is based in Las Vegas, NV.

== See also ==
- Skeeter Reece, member
