= Denis Frisoli =

American unicyclist (1959-2009)

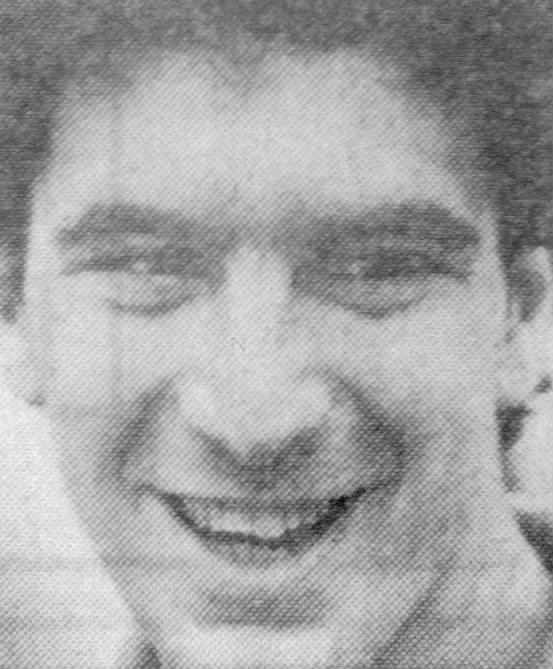
- Frisoli in 1982

Personal information
- Born: Denis M. Frisoli; February 25, 1959 Edison, New Jersey, U.S.
- Died: January 1, 2009 (aged 49)

Sport
- Country: United States
- Sport: Unicycling

Denis M. Frisoli (February 25, 1959 – January 1, 2009) was an American unicyclist. He gained national attention to the American public for holding the world record for riding a unicycle at a height of 35 ft (11 m) in 1981. His world record unicycle ride was referred as the "Tower of Death" by multiple sources.

== Life and career ==
Frisoli was born in Edison, New Jersey, the son of Pasquale and Louise Frisoli. He had four brothers. At the age of thirteen, he began riding a unicycle. He was an 8th degree black belt in kickboxing and taekwondo. In 1978, he graduated from J. P. Stevens High School in his hometown. According to The Star-Ledger, he worked in his brother's bicycle store.

At the age of 21, Frisoli gained national attention in 1981, by holding the world record for riding a unicycle at a height of 35 ft (11 m). According to the Courier News, his world record was verified as the "highest unassisted unicycle ride" by Rea Anders, but was not recognized by the Guinness World Records. His world record unicycle ride was referred as the "Tower of Death" by multiple sources. He previously attempted to break the world record in 1980.

In 1982, Frisoli rode the "Tower of Death" during a half-time show in front of 27,000 spectators at the New York Cosmos-Edmonton Drillers soccer match at Giants Stadium. He received multiple injuries after he fell from a height of 35 feet (11 m), including fracturing his right arm, though afterwards he expressed more concern about how his unicycle survived the incident.

== Death ==
Frisoli was found dead in his family's basement on January 1, 2009. He was 49 years old.
