= Polygenesis =

Polygenesis can refer to:

- Polygenesis (linguistics), a theory of language origin
- Polygenism, an obsolete theory of human origin
- Gene duplication, a form of genetic disorder resulting in the overexpression of a particular gene
- Polygenetic landforms, landforms formed the accumulative action of various processes

== See also ==
- Polygene, member of a group of interacting genes
- Monogenism (disambiguation)
