= Monogenism (disambiguation) =

Monogenism or the monogenesis theory of human origins posits a common descent for all humans, debated in the 19th-century, it gave way to the now widely accepted theory of the recent African origin of modern humans.

Monogenism or monogenesis may also refer to:

- Asexual reproduction, which involves only one parent
- Monogenesis (linguistics)
  - Monogenetic theory of pidgins

== See also ==
- Monogenetic (disambiguation)
- Monogenic (disambiguation)
- Polygenesis (disambiguation)
