= Kris Holm =

Canadian off-road unicyclist (born 1973)

Kris Holm (born July 15, 1973) is a Canadian best known for riding a unicycle in off-road conditions. He has ridden since 1985 and is considered one of the pioneers of off-road unicycling, and is the world's best-known unicyclist. He is the founder of competitive unicycle trials (unicycle obstacle riding) and was the 1999 North American, 2002 World, and 2005 European unicycle trials champion. He also held the unicycle sidehop world record from 1998-2004 (since broken), and performed trials demonstrations with the Norco Factory Trials Team from 1998-2006.

== Career ==
Holm first received a unicycle for his twelfth birthday, in 1985. Since then he has ridden off-road in many countries, including the summit of the highest mountain in Central America, the summit of the 3rd highest mountain in North America, trade-routes across the Himalayan Kingdom of Bhutan, and on the Great Wall of China. In 2006, he climbed and attempted a unicycle descent of Licancabur, a 5,950 metres (19,520 ft) volcano in Bolivia. In 2010, he competed against bikes in the 7-day BC Bike Race, becoming the first unicyclist to reach the podium in a major mountain bike race, with a 3rd-place finish (Men's Solo, Challenge Category) on Stage 5. He retired from semi-professional riding in 2013 at the age of 40, but still rides actively.

Holm was the first rider to bring mountain unicycling to a mainstream audience through film, television, and magazine features, and has been an advocate for public awareness of his sport. He has appeared in over 200 media features since 1998, including 13 films screened at mountain film festivals and festival tours. This exposure caused a major increase in the worldwide popularity of unicycling. His film, Into the Thunder Dragon, was named "One of the Top Twenty Adventure DVD's of All Time" in the December 2005 issue of Men's Journal. He has also been featured in many mainstream print publications, including Sports Illustrated Adventure, Men's Fitness, ESPN Magazine, and National Geographic Adventure.

In 1999 he founded Kris Holm Unicycles (KHU). Early models were prone to failure and breakages were common. KHU is now distributed around the world. KHU also sponsors a Factory Team, and offers the Evolution of Balance Award, a grant awarded annually to a team proposing a creative mountain unicycling adventure. KHU was the first Canadian company and first cycling brand to join One Percent for the Planet, an alliances of businesses donating 1% of gross revenue towards environmental causes. Holm has acted as an ambassador for the 1% brand since 2011.

His books include The Essential Guide to Mountain and Trials Unicycling, and chapters in Einradfahren: Moves & Tricks für Fortgeschrittene (Meyer&Meyer, 2010) and Adventurers of the 21st Century.

== Personal life ==
Kris Holm graduated with a M.Sc. from the University of British Columbia in 2002, and works as a professional geoscientist while also managing his unicycling brand. He lives with his wife and daughter in Vancouver, Canada.

== Video appearances ==
- One Tired Guy (film short compilation)
  - One Tired Guy (film festival edit)
- Skilletto (film short)
- Whitetrax (film short)
- Unizaba (film short)
  - Unizaba (adapted for National Geographic television)
- Fat Tire Fury (film short)
- Drunk in Public
- Into The Thunder Dragon (film and TV episode)
- Universe (action video segment)
- Universe 2 (action video segment)
- Defect (action video segment)
- Revolution One (film short)
  - Revolution One (feature film)
- New World Disorder (I and II)
- North Shore Extreme (II, III, and IV)
- The video clip of the single J.D Davis Life in the Extreme (edited from previous footage)
- Focal Point (film short, also featured on the film compilation Bicycle Dreams)

== Notable media appearances ==
- TV features (Ripley's Believe It Or Not!, You Gotta See This, Rekord Fieber, More than Human, World Fantastic Heros, National Geographic, various news broadcasts, various)
- Magazines (Bike, Mountain Bike, Mountain Bike Downhill, Dirt Rag, Outside, ESPN, Men's Fitness, GQ, Stuff, FHM, Outdoor Photographer, National Geographic Adventure, Sports Illustrated Adventure, various)

== Film festival appearances ==
- Banff Mountain Film Festival and World Tour (USA, International) (2000 - Skilletto; 2001 - Unizaba, Fat Tire Fury; 2002 - Whitetrax; 2009 - Revolution One)
- Vancouver International Mountain Film Festival and Tour (Canada) (2000 - Skilletto; 2001 - Unizaba; 2002 - Into the Thunder Dragon; 2009 - Revolution One, 2011 - Multimedia, 2012 - Focal Point)
- Telluride Mountain Film Festival and Tour (USA) (2000 - Skilletto; 2001 - Unizaba, Fat Tire Fury; 2002 - Whitetrax; 2009 - Revolution One)
- Tube (X-Games) Film Festival (USA) (2000 - Universe)
- Grand Rapids Film Festival (USA) - (2010 - Into the Thunder Dragon)
- Budapest Mountain Film Festival (Hungary) (2003 - Into the Thunder Dragon)
- Victoria Mountain Bike Film Festival (Canada) (2001 - Unizaba)
- Outside Magazine Film Festival Tour (USA) (2001 - Into the Thunder Dragon)
- Kathmandu Film Festival (Nepal) (2002 - Into the Thunder Dragon)
- X-Dance Film Festival (USA) (2001 - New World Disorder)
- 5-Point Film Festival (USA) (2009 - Revolution One)
- Kendall Film Festival (UK) (2002 - Into The Thunder Dragon, 2010 - Revolution One)
- Moscow International Film Festival (Russia) (2003 - Unizaba, Into The Thunder Dragon)
- Hory a Mesto Film Festival (Slovakia) (2003 - Whitetrax, Into the Thunder Dragon)
- Climb for Yosemite Film Festival (USA) (2003 - Into the Thunder Dragon)
- Taos Mountain Film Festival (USA) (2001 - New World Disorder, 2003 - Into the Thunder Dragon; 2009 - Revolution One)
- Bike in Film Film Festival (USA) (2005 - One Tired Guy)
- Harmony Arts Festival (Canada) (2006 - Into the Thunder Dragon)
- Williamstown Mountain Film Festival (USA) (2009 - Revolution One)
- AdventureFilm Film Festival (USA) (2009 - Revolution One)
- Schaff Mountain Film Festival (UK) (2009 - Revolution One; 2014 - Focal Point)
- Kalamazoo Film Festival (USA) (2010 - Revolution One)
- Moving Adventures Film Festival Tour (European Union) (2003, 2010 - One Tired Guy)
- Durango Film Festival (USA)(2013 - Focal Point)
- New Zealand Mountain Film Festival (NZ)(2013 - Focal Point)
- Adventure Movie Awards (Italy)(2013 - Focal Point)
