= Coker Tire =

American tire company

- Type: Private
- Industry: Tires; Whitewall tires Muscle Car tires Hot Rod tires Classic Car tires
- Founded: Tennessee (January 30, 1958; 68 years ago)
- Founder: Harold Coker
- Headquarters: Chattanooga, Tennessee, United States
- Key people: Bruce Ronning, CEO
- Products: Tires and wheels for collector vehicles
- Website: cokertire.com

Coker Tire Company is a Chattanooga, Tennessee-based company that manufactures and sells vintage-style Michelin, Firestone, BF Goodrich and U.S. Royal bias-ply and radial whitewall tires for collector automobiles.

== History ==
The company was originally a tire and service center founded in 1958 by Harold Coker. He would later give his son Corky Coker the opportunity to manage the antique division, which was a small percentage of the company's earnings. Corky devoted 40 years to growing the antique division of the business, eventually making it the company's primary focus. In November 2018, Corky sold Coker Tire and its parent company, Coker Group, to Irving Place Capital.

Though Coker's products retain the appearance of the old tires by using the original, refurbished molds, or new molds built from original drawings, the tires are made with modern materials. Coker Tire was given manufacturing rights by the original tire brands, and also has acquired many different tire molds of the original obsolete tires they manufacture. Coker Tire also offers wheels for collector vehicles.

== Tires ==
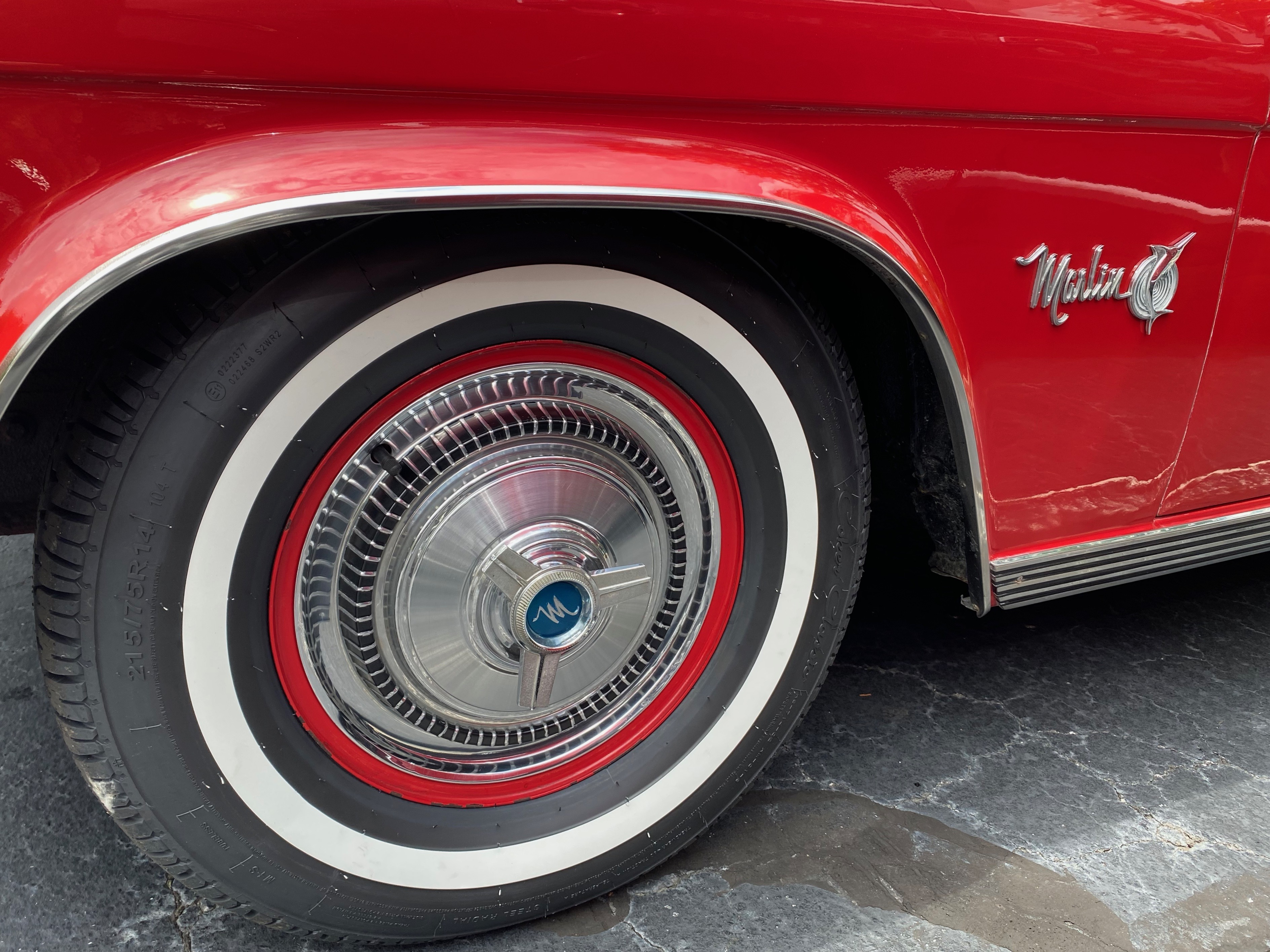
Cocker Classic radial whitewall tire on a 1965 Rambler Marlin

Coker Tire sells its own brand of bias ply and radial tires, called the Coker Classic, but it also offers several popular brands, such as B.F. Goodrich, Firestone, U.S. Royal, Michelin, Excelsior, and American Classic in bias ply and radial construction. Coker Tire is the source for Firestone Deluxe Champion tires and B.F. Goodrich Silvertown tires. Many are exact OEM replacements for various vintage makes and models. Coker also sells modern radial tires made with whitewalls, redlines, and other sidewall treatments, built for many applications. Using refurbished original molds, the tires are authentic to the originals, while the modern manufacturing procedures and materials offer safe and reliable driving characteristics. The tires with custom sidewalls, such as whitewall or redline, are manufactured with the special sidewall built in from day one, instead of adding the sidewall to an existing tire.

In 1994, Coker Tire released a radial tire with a wide whitewall, a first of its kind. Coker now sells many brands that offer whitewall radial tires, and distributes a modern radial tire that has the narrow tread profile and distinct shoulders of a vintage bias ply tire. They have a vintage look with the increased driving comfort of a radial tire. Coker Tire also has a Performance Division, which sells mostly drag racing tires. Coker sells M&H Racemaster, Pro-Trac, and select Firestone vintage tires through its performance division. Coker has also developed a line of Firestone Indy tires, built for a variety of vintage Indy cars.

Other unique offerings are its tires for Vintage Trucks and Military Vehicles, as well as its Vintage Motorcycle tires. Coker Tire also sells inner tubes and other tire accessories for vintage vehicles.

== Wheels ==
Coker Tire sells wheels and wheel accessories for a wide range of applications under the Wheel Vintiques brand. Most of its offerings are steel wheels, designed to replace worn out OEM wheels, on makes such as Chevrolet, Ford, Pontiac, Oldsmobile, Mercury, Chrysler, Buick and many others. Coker also offers OEM wire wheels for Buick, Cadillac, Chrysler, Packard, Ford Model A and Ford Thunderbird but also offers custom wire wheels for hot rods. Hubcaps, trim rings valve stems and other tire and wheel accessories are offered by Coker. Coker proudly advertises that it will provide free mounting and balancing if customers buy tires and wheels together.

== Memorabilia ==
With official licensing for Michelin vintage products, as well as Firestone vintage products, Coker Tire sells automotive memorabilia, in addition to its tires, wheels and accessories. Metal signs, neon clocks, and poly-resin figurines are available items. Coker also sells die cast vehicles, and other collectible merchandise.

== Bicycles and unicycles ==
Coker previously marketed the following specialty bicycles, which have since been discontinued:

- "Wheelman", a penny-farthing, with a 36-inch (910 mm) wheel in front and a 12-inch (300 mm) wheel behind;
- Cruiser-style bicycle with 36 inch wheels called the "Monster Cruiser";
- Two touring-style unicycles called "The Big One" and the "V2", each with a 36-inch tire and wheel combination.
