= Monogenic =

Monogenic may refer to:

- Monogenic disorder, disease, inheritance, or trait, a single gene disorder resulting from a single mutated gene
  - Monogenic diabetes, or maturity-onset diabetes of the young (MODY), forms of diabetes caused by mutations in an autosomal dominant gene
  - Monogenic obesity
- Monogenic field, in mathematics, an algebraic number field K
- Monogenic function, a function in an algebra over a field
- Monogenic polynomial, an alternate name for monic polynomial
- Monogenic semigroup, in mathematics, a semigroup generated by a set containing only a single element
- Monogenic signal, in the theory of analytic signals
- Monogenic system, in classical mechanics, a physical system

== See also ==
- Monogenous (disambiguation)
- Monogenetic (disambiguation)
- Monogenism (disambiguation)
