= Ride the Lobster =

2008 world's longest unicycle race

Ride the Lobster was the world's longest unicycle race, held in June 2008. This 800-kilometre international relay race around the roads of Nova Scotia, Canada, was conceived by Edward Wedler. He gave the race its unusual name because he thought the roadways around Nova Scotia resembled a lobster.

The five-day race had five stages, composed of four legs winding around the province of approximately 200 km each and one day of time trials. The first stage was from Yarmouth to Annapolis Royal. The second stage went to St. Margarets. The third stage was composed of two time trials, Hubbards in the morning and Truro in the early evening. The fourth stage was from Truro to Antigonish. The final stage went from Port Hawkesbury to Baddeck. The event coordinator, Heather LeBlanc, intentionally made early stages easier for the contestants and the final stretch difficult.

It was originally proposed to hold the race annually but there have been no subsequent events.

== Rules ==
Each team was composed of four people—three riders and one in support. The support person was not allowed to ride. The three riders took turns completing the distance of the race. The rider was not to be switched over the first 10 kilometres of each race day. After that, the team had full discretion as to how often they wanted to switch riders.

All riders completed the 21 km time trial.

== The race ==
The 2008 Ride the Lobster logo

In 2008, the inaugural race began on 16 June, with 104 riders (124 had qualified) in 35 teams from fourteen countries.

The race concluded in Cape Breton with contestants reaching the finish line between 5–7 pm on June 20. The winning team was awarded $5,000 in cash and prizes.

The pre-race hypothesis that geared unicycles would offer a significant advantage over non-'gunis' was seemingly born out, as the winning team rode gunis.

=== Results ===
Rank	Team	Country	Time HH:MM:SS
1	German Speeders (Jan Logemann, Johannes Helck, Arne Tilgen, Holger Summer)	Germany	36:17:47
2	NZUNI (William Sklenars, Ken Looi, Tony Melton and Véronique Grégoire)	New Zealand	36:35:46
3	Texacali (Kevin Chang, Corbin Dunn, A.J. Greig and Sondra Grisham)	United States of America	37:17:18
4	Personal Rollercoaster (Roland Kays, Vincent Lemay, Steve Relles and David Kays)	United States of America and Canada	37:29:38
5	Smile (Geoffrey Huntley, Chuck Edwall, Sam Wakeling and Jonathan Marshall)	Australia, United States of America and United Kingdom	37:52:05
