= Cycle, North Carolina =

Unincorporated community in North Carolina, US

Coordinates: 36°08′03″N 80°50′31″W

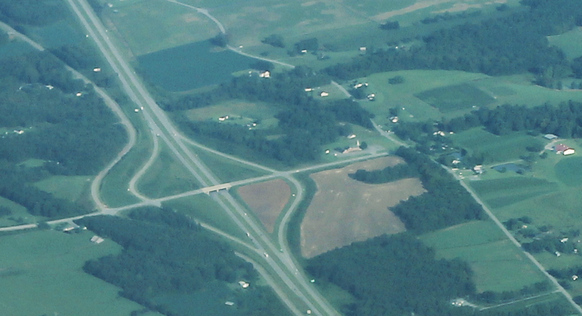
Aerial view of Cycle next to the US 421 exit

Cycle is an unincorporated community in Yadkin County, North Carolina, United States.

== History ==
A post office called Cycle was established in 1904, and remained in operation until 1972. The origin of the name "Cycle" is obscure.
