= Unicycle =

One-wheeled mode of transportation

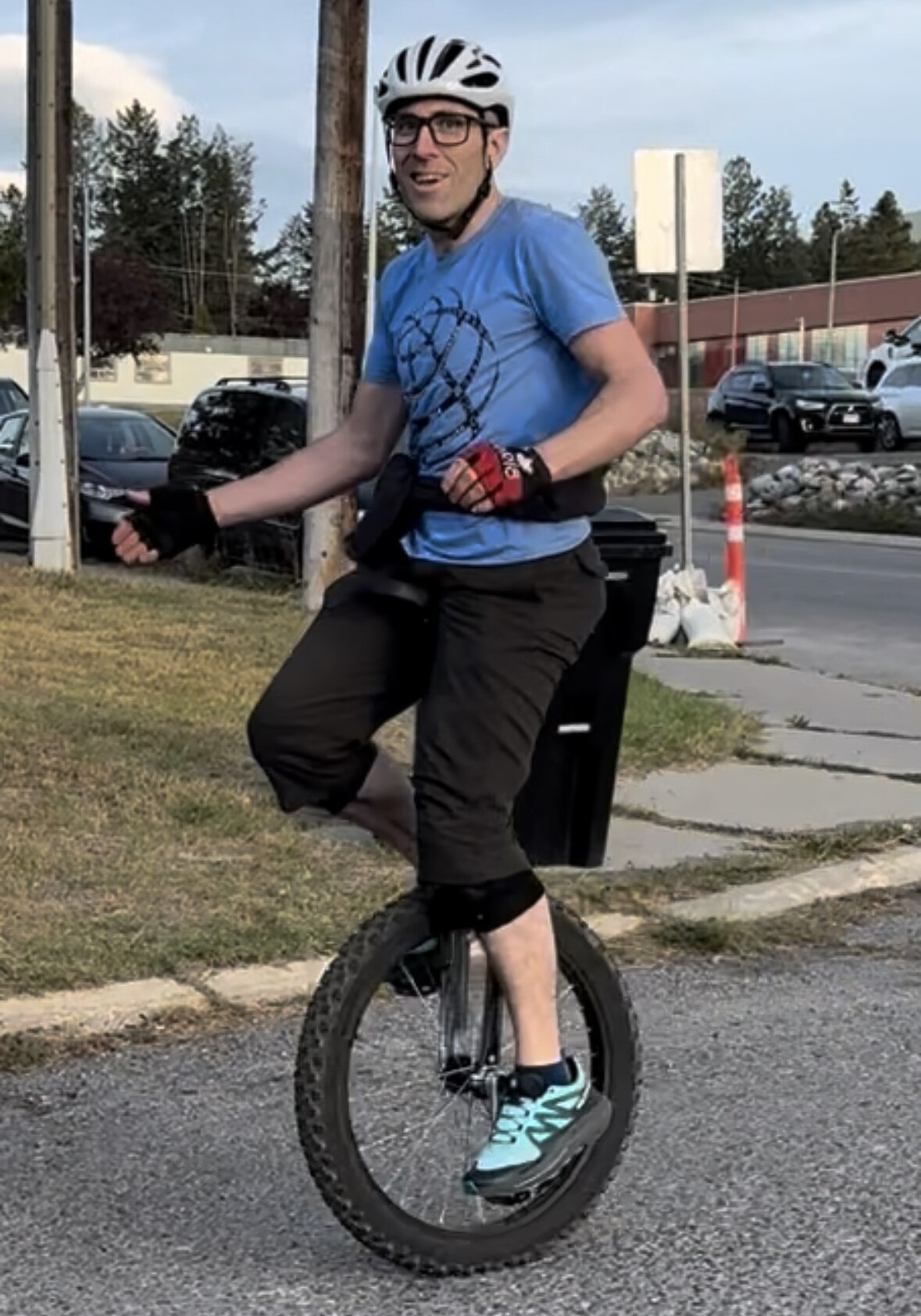
A unicycle

A unicycle (also monocycle) is a vehicle that touches the ground with only one wheel. The most common variation has a frame with a saddle, and has a pedal-driven direct-drive. A two speed hub is commercially available for faster unicycling. Unicycling is practiced professionally in circuses, by street performers, in festivals, and as a hobby. Unicycles have also been used to create new sports such as unicycle basketball and unicycle hockey. In recent years, unicycles have also been used in mountain unicycling, an activity similar to mountain biking or trials.

== History ==
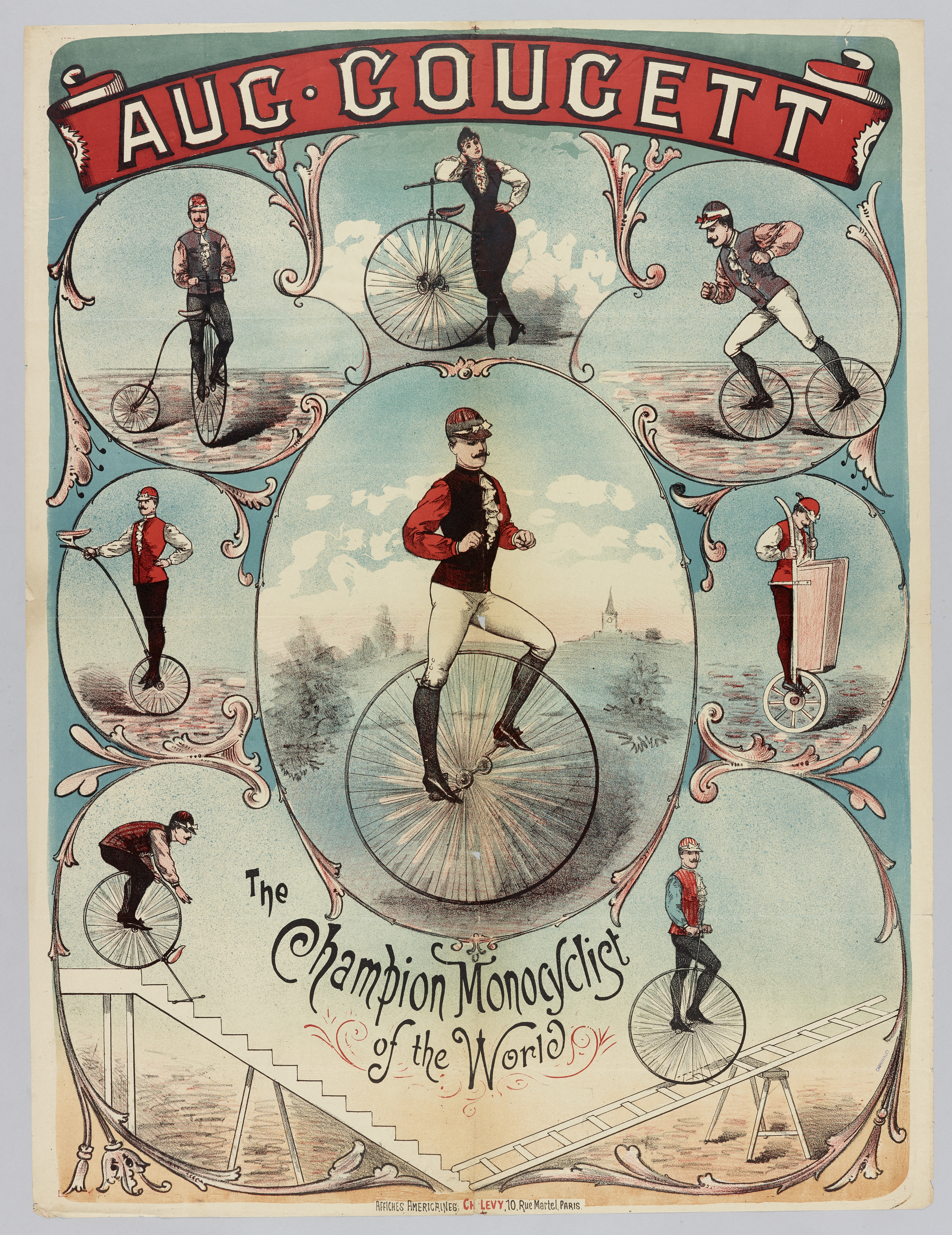
Advertisement for Auguste Gougett, a French unicycle performer, circa 1890.

US patents for single-wheeled 'velocipedes' were published in 1869 by Frederick Myers and in 1881 by Battista Scuri.

Unicycle design has developed since the penny-farthing and later the advent of the first unicycle into many variations including: the seatless unicycle ("ultimate wheel") the tall ("giraffe") unicycle and "2-wheelers" or "3-wheelers" (multiple wheels stacked directly on top of each other). During the late 1980s some extreme sportsmen took an interest in the unicycle and modified unicycles to enable them to engage in off-road or mountain unicycling, trials unicycling and street unicycling.

== Unicycles compared to other pedal powered vehicles ==
Bicycles, tricycles and quadracycles share (with minor variations) several basic parts including wheels, pedals, cranks, forks, and the saddle with unicycles. Without a rider, unicycles lack stability – however, a proficient unicyclist is usually more stable than a similarly proficient rider on a bicycle as the wheel is not constrained by the linear axis of a frame. Unicycles usually, but not always, lack brakes, gears, and the ability to freewheel. Given these differences, the injuries that can occur from unicycle use tend to be different from that of bicycle use. In particular, head injuries are significantly less likely among unicycle use compared to bicycle use.

== Construction ==
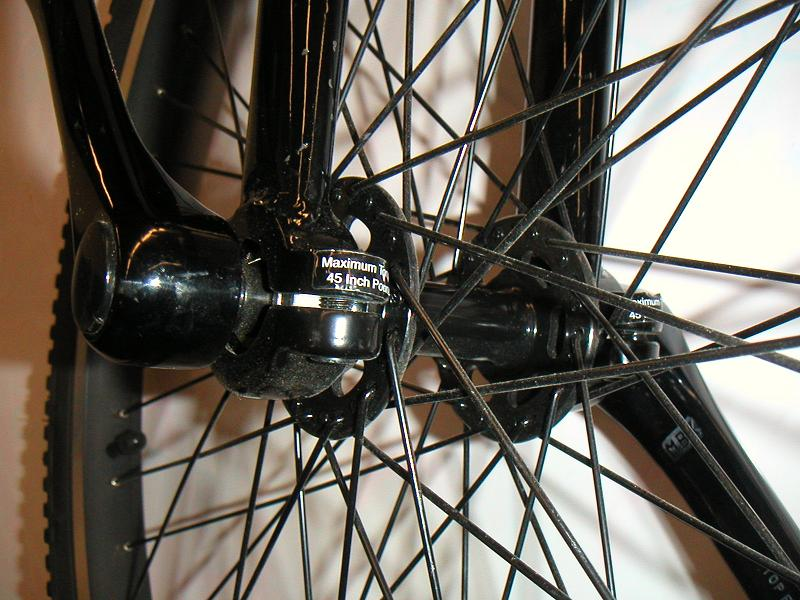
A unicycle hub

Unicycles have a few key parts:

- The wheel (which includes the tire, tube, rim, spokes, hub and axle)
- The cranks (which attach the pedals to the wheel hub)
- The hub (connects the spokes to a central point and also transfers pedaling power to the wheel)
- Pedals
- Fork-style frame
- Seatpost
- Saddle (the seat of the unicycle)

The wheel is usually similar to a bicycle wheel with a special hub designed so the axle is a fixed part of the hub. This means the rotation of the cranks directly controls the rotation of the wheel (called direct-drive). The frame sits on top of the axle bearings, while the cranks attach to the ends of the axle, and the seatpost slides into the frame to allow the saddle to be height adjusted.

== Types of unicycles ==
Types of unicycle include:

- Freestyle unicycles
- Trials unicycles
- Mountain unicycles (also called Munis)
- Giraffe unicycles
- Commuter unicycles
- Street unicycles
- Cruiser unicycles
- Road unicycles

Each type has many combinations of frame strength, wheel diameter, and crank length.

=== Freestyle unicycles ===
Generally used for flatland skills and freestyle routines, freestyle unicycles typically have a relatively high seatpost, a narrow saddle, and a squared fork (used for one-footed tricks). These unicycles are used similarly to flatland bicycles. Wheel size is usually 20 inches (510 mm), but smaller riders may use 16-or-12-inch (410 or 300 mm) unicycles. Some people prefer 24-inch (610 mm) wheels. Many freestyle unicyclists will use white tires to avoid tire marks when riding indoors.

=== Trials unicycles ===
Designed for unicycle trials, these unicycles are stronger than standard unicycles in order to withstand the stresses caused by jumping, dropping, and supporting the weight of the unicycle and rider on components such as the pedals and cranks. Many trials unicycles also have wide, 19-or-20-inch (480-or-510-millimetre) knobby tires to absorb some of the impact on drops.

=== Mountain unicycles ("MUnis") ===
Mountain unicycling (abbreviated to muni or MUni) consists of riding specialized unicycles on mountain bike trails or otherwise off-roading. Mountain unicycles have thicker, wider tires for better traction. Riders may occasionally lower air pressure for increased shock absorption. Many riders choose to use long cranks to increase power when riding up hills and over rough terrain. A disc brake is sometimes used for descents; the brake handle is attached to the underside of the handle on the front of the saddle.

=== Touring/commuter unicycles ===
Used for long distances, these unicycles are specially made to cover distances. They have a large wheel diameter, between 26 and 36 in (660 and 910 mm), so more distance is covered in less pedal rotation. A 36-inch (910 mm) unicycle made by the Coker Tire company started the big wheel trend. Some variations on the traditional touring unicycle include the Schlumpf "GUni" (geared unicycle), which uses a two-speed internal fixed-geared hub. Larger direct-drive wheels tend to have shorter cranks to allow for easier cadence and more speed. Geared wheels, with an effective diameter larger than the wheel itself, tend to use longer cranks to increase torque as they are not required to achieve such high cadences as direct-drive wheels, but demand greater force per pedal stroke.

=== Other variations ===
- Giraffe, a chain-driven unicycle. Use of a chain or multiple wheels in a gear-like configuration can make the unicycle much taller than standard unicycles (note that multi-wheel unicycles can be described as giraffes). Standard unicycles don't have a chain, which limits the seat height based on how long the rider's legs are, because there the crank is attached directly to the wheel axle. Giraffe unicycles can range in heights from 0.91 to 3.05 m (3 to 10 feet).
- Geared unicycle, or GUni, a unicycle whose wheel rotates faster than the pedal cadence. They are used for distance riding and racing.
- Multi-wheeled unicycle, a unicycle with more than one wheel, stacked on top of each other so that only one wheel touches the ground (nicknamed stacks). The wheels are linked together by chains or direct contact with each other. These unicycles can also be called giraffes.
- Kangaroo unicycle, a unicycle that has both the cranks facing in the same direction. They are so named due to the hopping motion of the rider's legs, supposedly resembling the jumping of a kangaroo.
- Eccentric unicycle, a unicycle that has the hub off-center in the wheel. Putting an eccentric wheel on a kangaroo unicycle can make riding easier, and the rider's motion appear more kangaroo-like.
- Ultimate wheel, a unicycle with no frame or seat, just a wheel and pedals.
- Impossible wheel, or BC wheel, a wheel with pegs or metal plates connected to the axle for the rider to stand on. These wheels are for coasting and jumping. A purist form of unicycle, without cranks.
- Monocycle, or monowheel, a large wheel inside which the rider sits (as in a hamster wheel), either motorized or pedal-powered. The greater gyroscopic properties and lower center of mass make it easier to balance than a normal unicycle but less maneuverable.
- Self-balancing unicycle or electric unicycle, a computer-controlled, motor-driven, self-balancing unicycle.
- Freewheeling unicycle, a unicycle in which the hub has a freewheel mechanism, allowing the rider, to coast or move forward without pedaling, as a common bicycle does. These unicycles almost always have brakes because they cannot stop the way traditional unicycles do. The brake lever is generally mounted in the bottom of the saddle. These unicycles also cannot go backwards.
- Tandem
- Recumbent
- Hydraulic giraffe that can change in height while being ridden
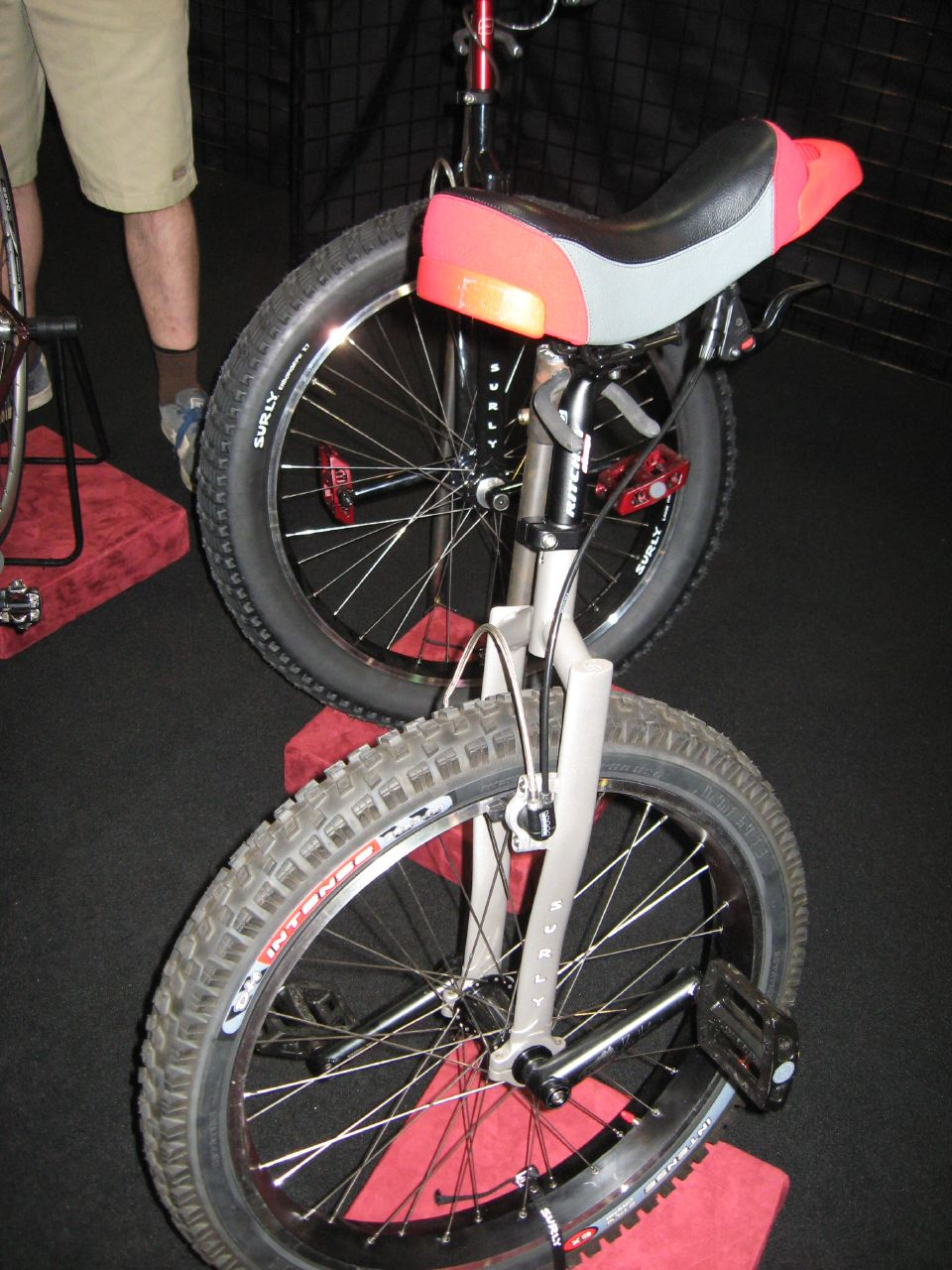
Off-road unicycles

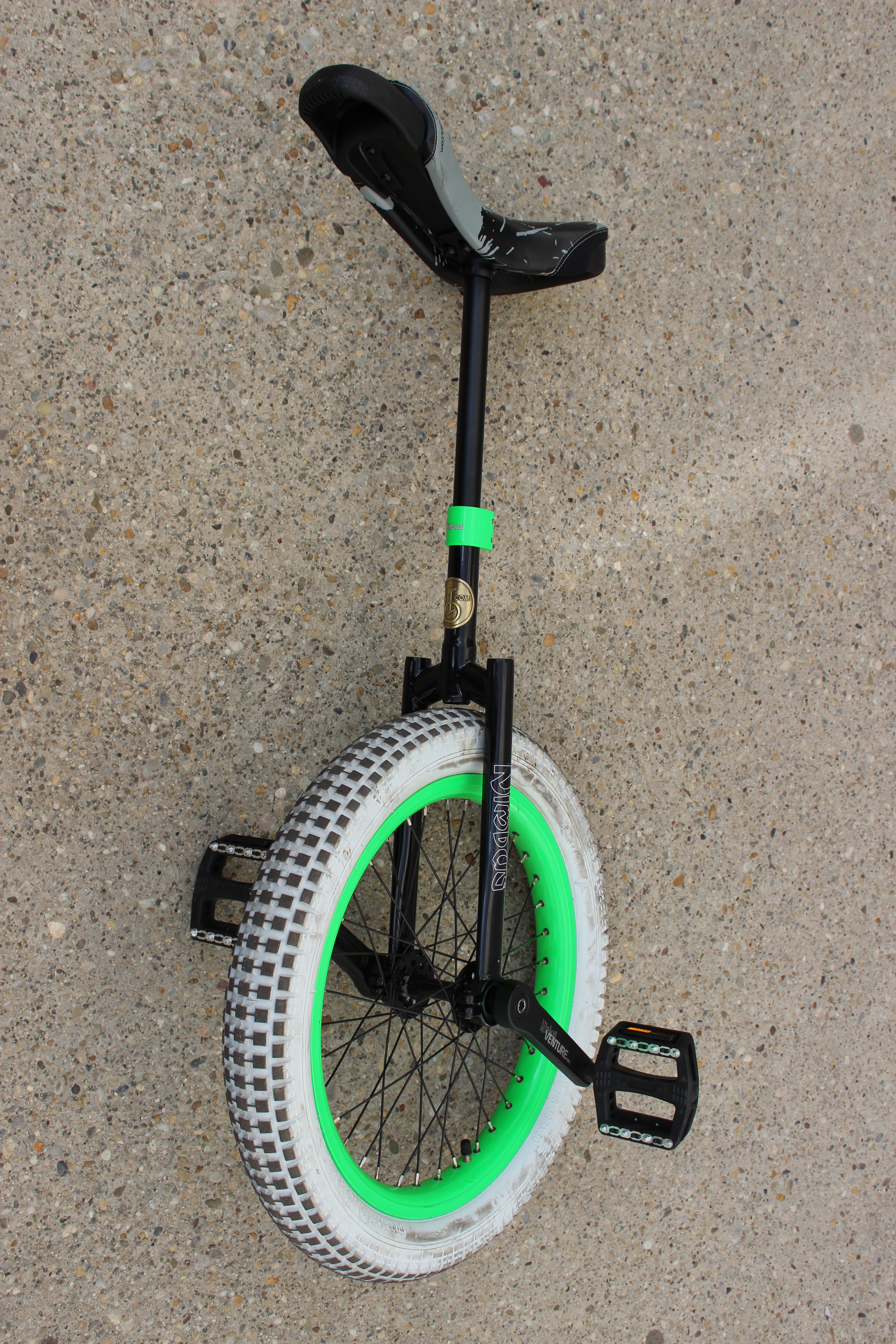
Trial unicycle

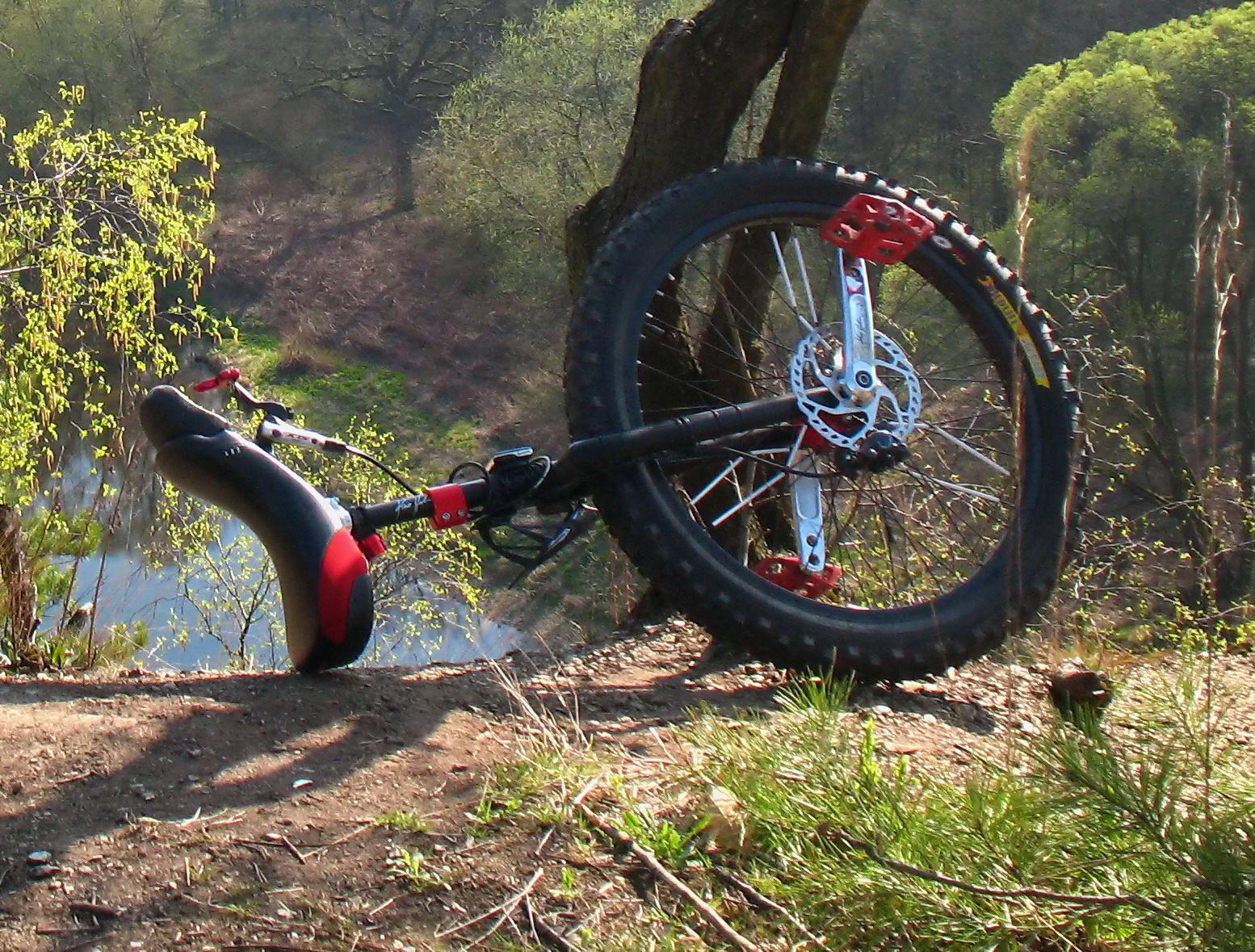
Muni with disc brake

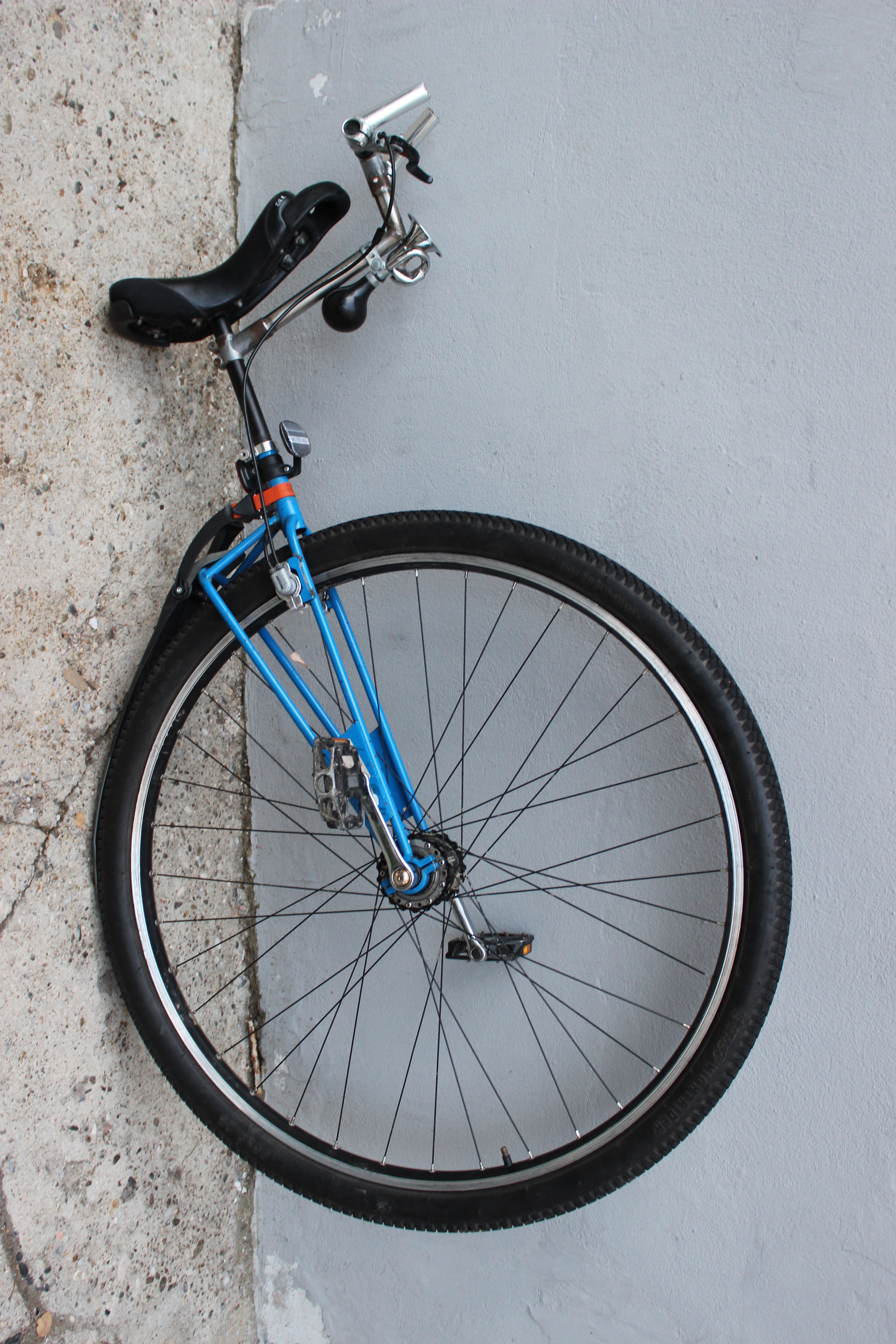
36-inch (910 mm) unicycle with Schlumpf gear

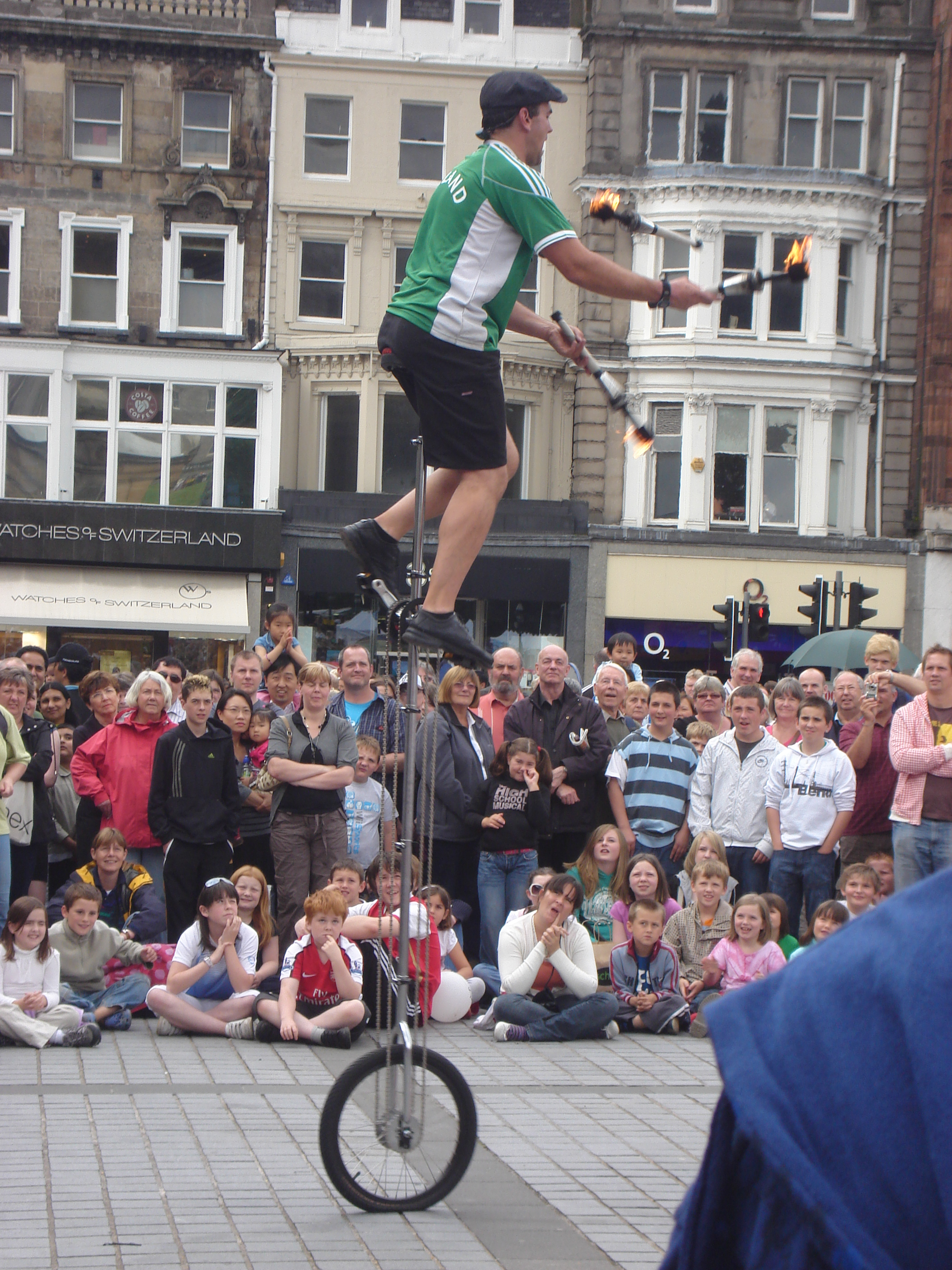
Giraffe unicycle

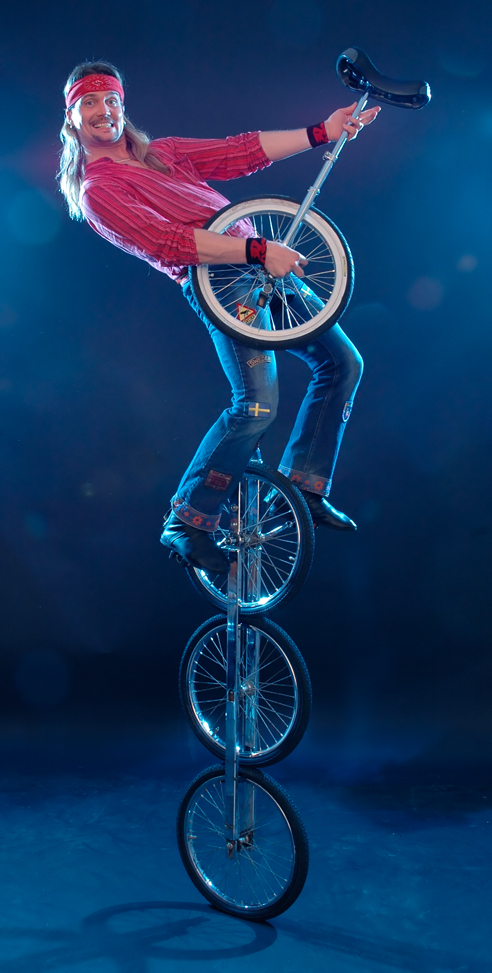
Multi-wheeled unicycle performed by Swedish stunt artist Malte Knapp at Circus Circus Las Vegas in 2007

== Training aids ==
Training aids are sometimes used to make it easier to become comfortable with riding a unicycle. One method for training is using a spotter to make riding easier. Another method is finding a narrow hallway that can be used to help alleviate left and right balancing while allowing a beginner to focus on forward and backward balance. Equally, riding back and forth between two chairs, faced back to back, while holding on to the chair backs allows the user to gauge how to appropriately position oneself before setting off. Using props such as sticks or ski poles is generally discouraged as they hinder balance and create dependence. A fall onto props could also cause serious injury.

== Riding styles ==
Traditionally, unicycling has been seen as a circus skill which has been performed at events to entertain the public in the circus or during parades, carnivals or street festivals. Recent developments in the strength and durability of bicycle (and consequently unicycle) parts have given rise to many new activities including trials of unicycling and mountain unicycling. Unicycling is arguably now as much a competitive sport and recreational pursuit as an entertainment activity.

The principal types of unicycling are:

Freestyle
Perhaps the oldest form of unicycling, traditional freestyle riding is based on performance. Freestyle tricks and moves are derived from different ways of riding the unicycle, and linking these moves together into one long flowing line that is aesthetically pleasing. Competitions look very similar to figure skating, with riders performing routines to music.

Comedy
Along with freestyle it is a performance style of unicycling. Often employed by clowns and other circus skills performers. Comedy unicycling exaggerates the perceived difficulty of riding a unicycle to create a comedic performance.

Trials unicycling
Trials unicycling is specifically aimed at negotiating obstacles. Analogous to trials bike riding.

Street unicycling
Street unicycling as a style involves riders using a combination of objects found in urbanized settings (such as ledges, handrails, and stairs) to perform a wide variety of tricks. Many tricks are similar to those performed in other extreme sports, such as BMX and skateboarding.

Off-road or mountain unicycling (abbreviated to 'MUni')
MUni is riding on rough terrain and has developed as a form of unicycling in recent years.

Touring or commuting
This style concentrates on distance riding. With a 29-or-36-inch (740-or-910-millimetre) wheel cruising speeds of 16 to 24 km/h (10 to 15 mph) or more can easily be reached.

Flatland unicycling
This style of unicycling is similar to freestyle in that various tricks and movements are performed on flat ground. Flatland, however, does not have the performance element of freestyle, but instead has tricks that are similar to those in BMX and skateboarding.

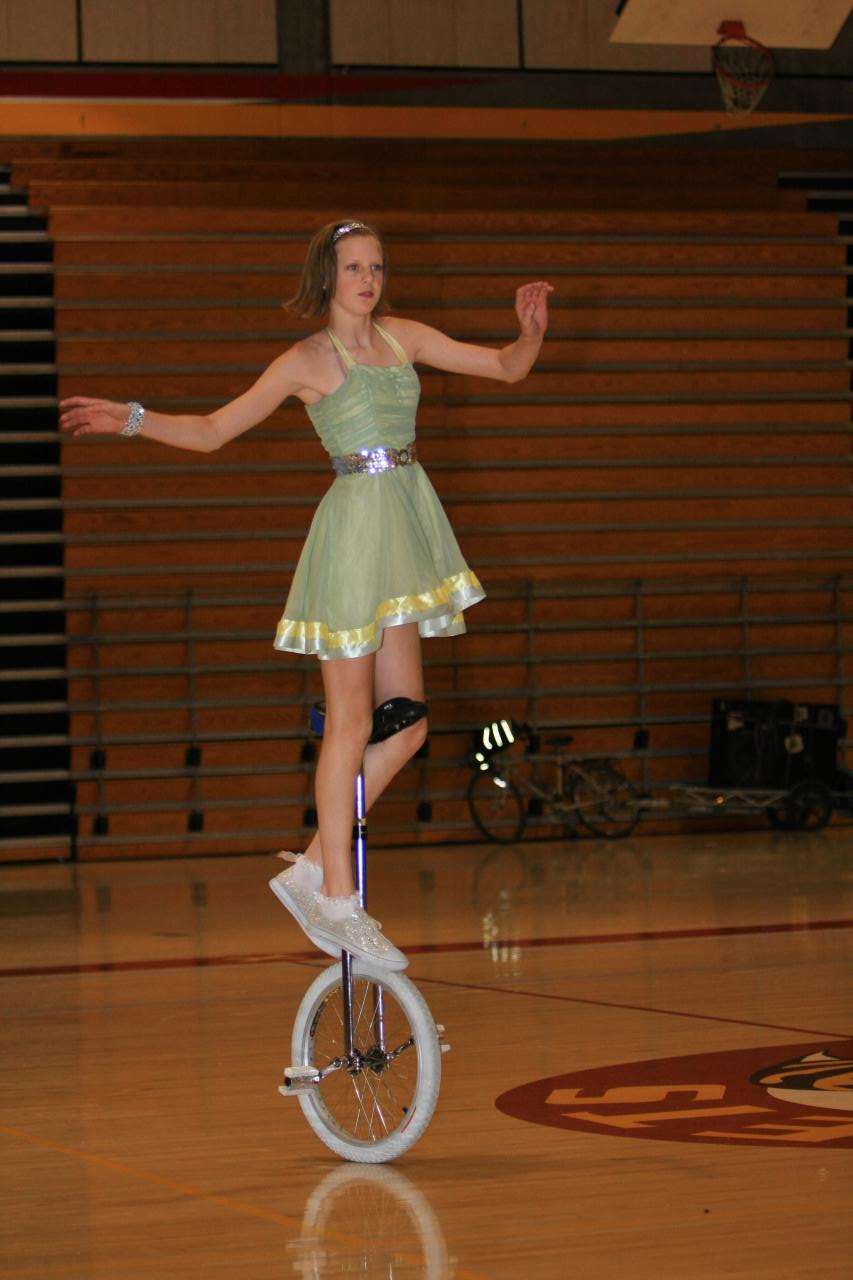
Freestyle

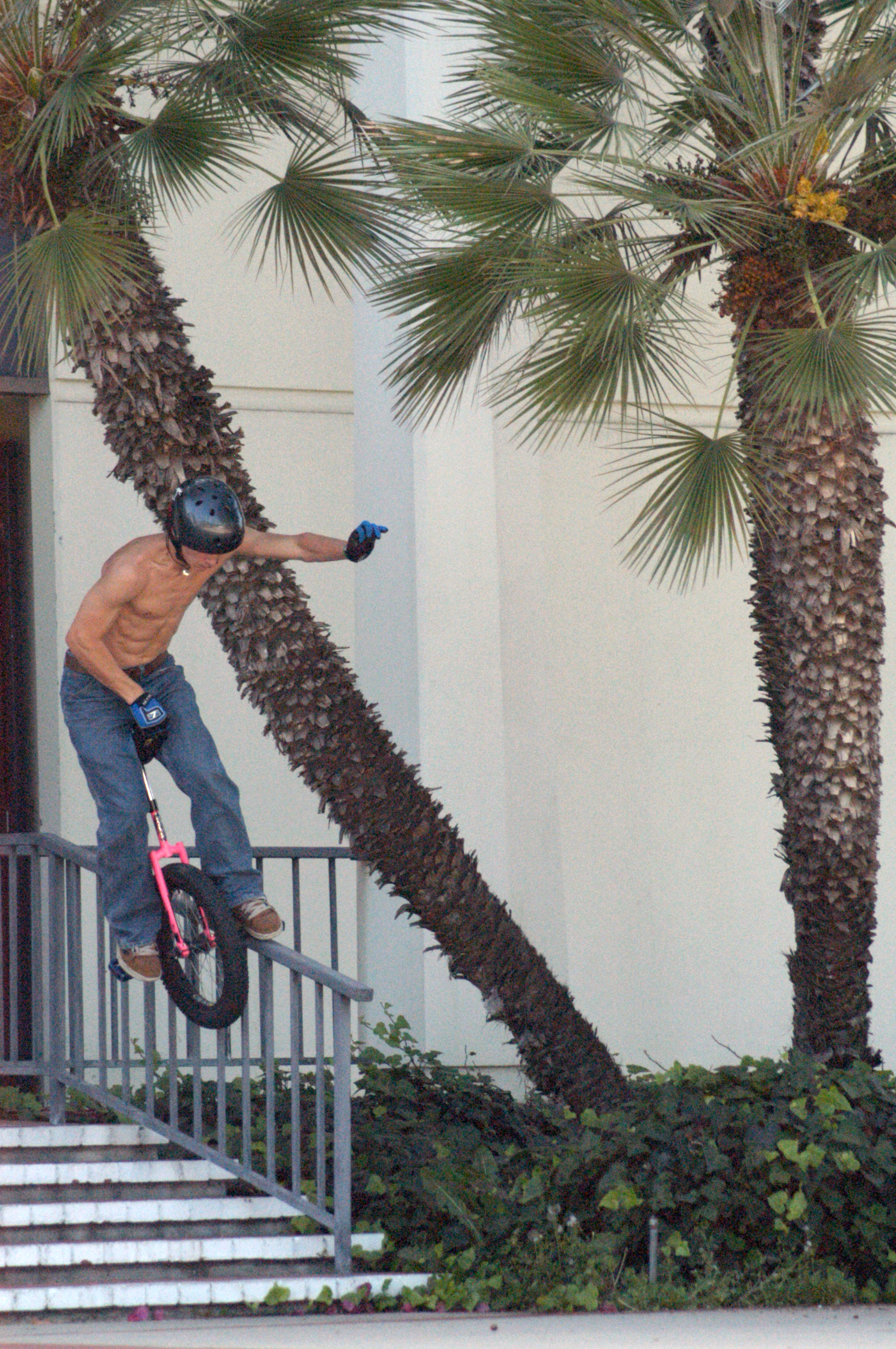
Jess Riegel grinds a rail, a street unicycling skill

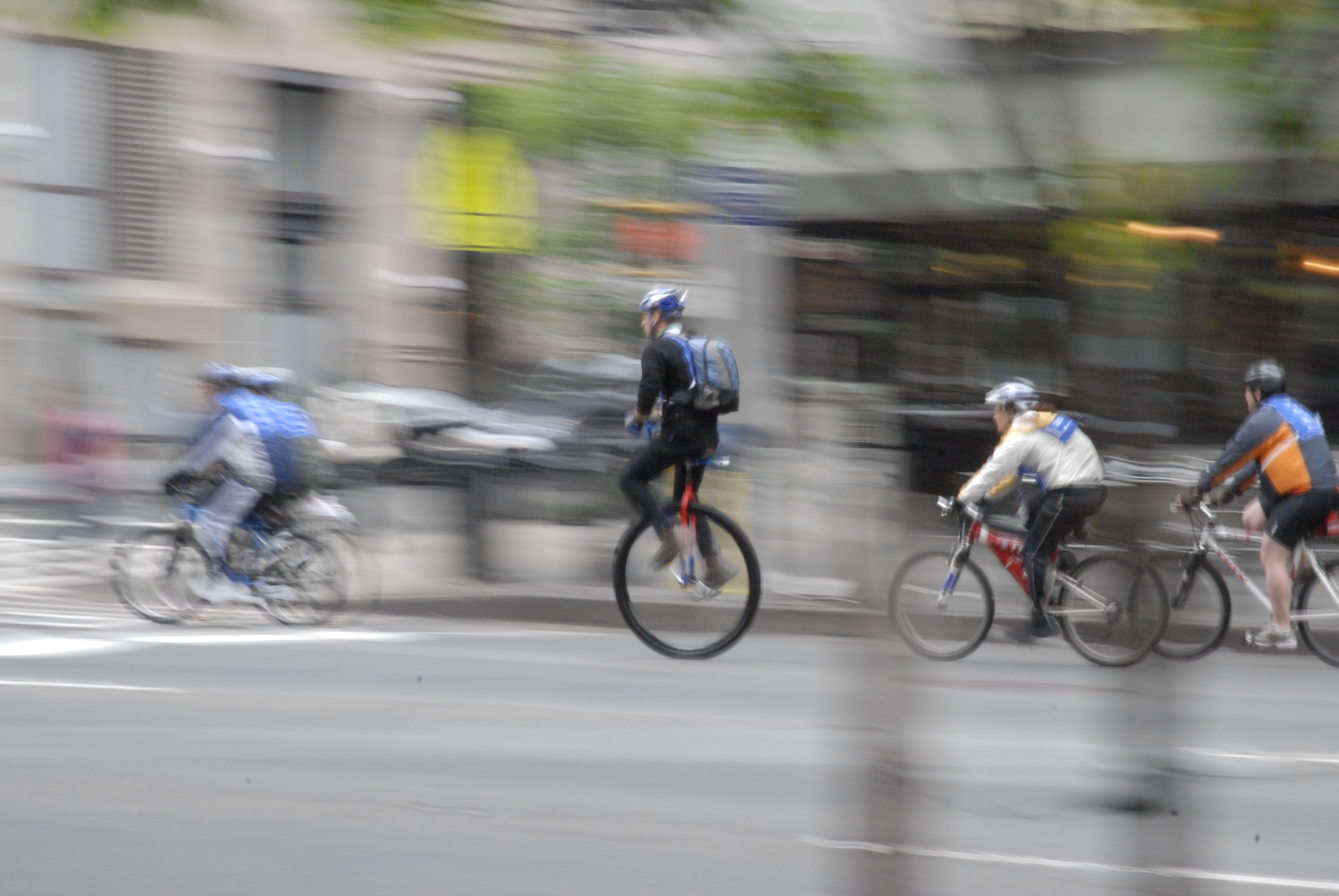
Commuting-style riding on a 36er at the Five Boro Bike Tour

== Unicycle team sports ==
Unicycling is also performed as a team sport.

=== Unicycle basketball ===
Unicycle basketball uses a regulation basketball on a regular basketball court with almost the same rules, e.g., one must dribble the ball while riding. There are a number of rules that are particular to unicycle basketball as well, e.g., a player must be mounted on the unicycle when in-bounding the ball. Unicycle basketball is usually played using 24-inch (up to 640mm) or smaller unicycles, and using plastic pedals, both to preserve the court and the players' shins. In North America, regular unicycle basketball games are organized in Berkeley, San Luis Obispo, Newbury (OH). Switzerland, France and Puerto Rico have competitive teams. The Puerto Rico All Star Unicycling Basketball Team has been one of the dominant teams and has won several world championships.

=== Unicycle hockey ===
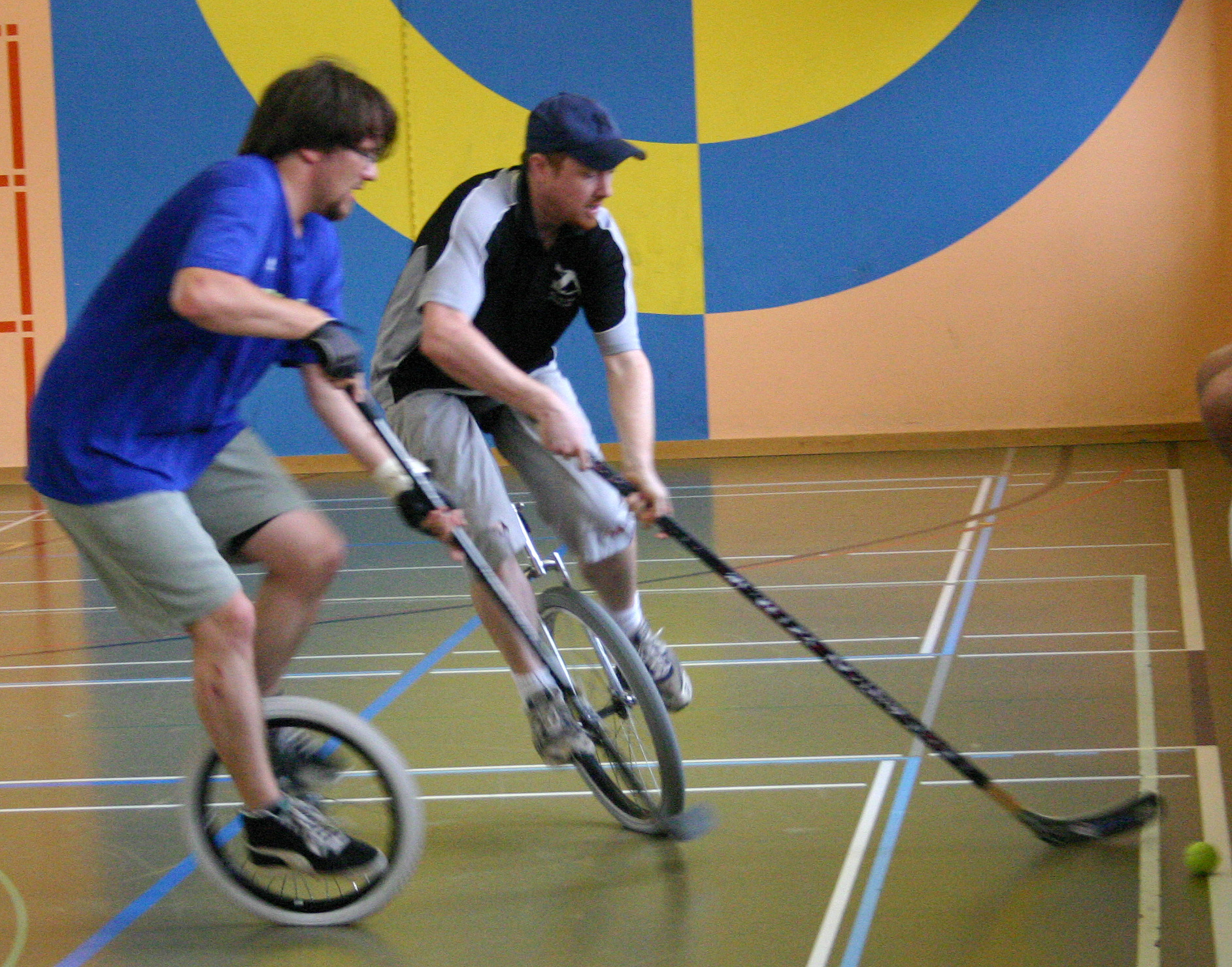
Unicycle Hockey

Unicycle hockey follows rules similar to rink hockey, using a tennis ball and ice-hockey sticks. Play is mostly non-contact. The sport has active leagues in Germany, Switzerland, Australia and the UK and international tournaments held at least bi-annually. Tournaments in the UK are held by various teams across the country usually in sports halls, but occasionally outside. Each tournament lasts a day and around 8 teams normally compete in a round-robin league with the winner being whoever has the most points. If two teams have the same number of points the winner can be decided by goal difference or a penalty shoot-out.

== Notable unicyclists ==
=== Known as unicyclists ===
==== Individuals ====
- Kris Holm and George Peck, pioneers in mountain unicycling
- Rudy Horn, a German juggler
- Ernest Montego, a German juggler
- Jiang Yan Jing, Chinese acrobat
- Ted Jorgensen, circus unicyclist, president of the Albuquerque Unicycle Club
- Michael Goudeau, an American juggler
- Denis Frisoli, an American unicyclist who held the world record for riding a unicycle at a height of 35ft
- Skeeter Reece, an American clown
- Amy Shields, an American freestyle unicyclist
- Dustin Kelm, worldwide variety unicycle performer
- "Wobbling" Wally Watts, round the world unicyclist, April 1976 to October 1978
- Ed Pratt, round the world unicyclist, March 2015 to July 2018
- Mike Taylor, World Champion in Unicycle High Jump in 2014, 2016 & 2018

==== Groups ====
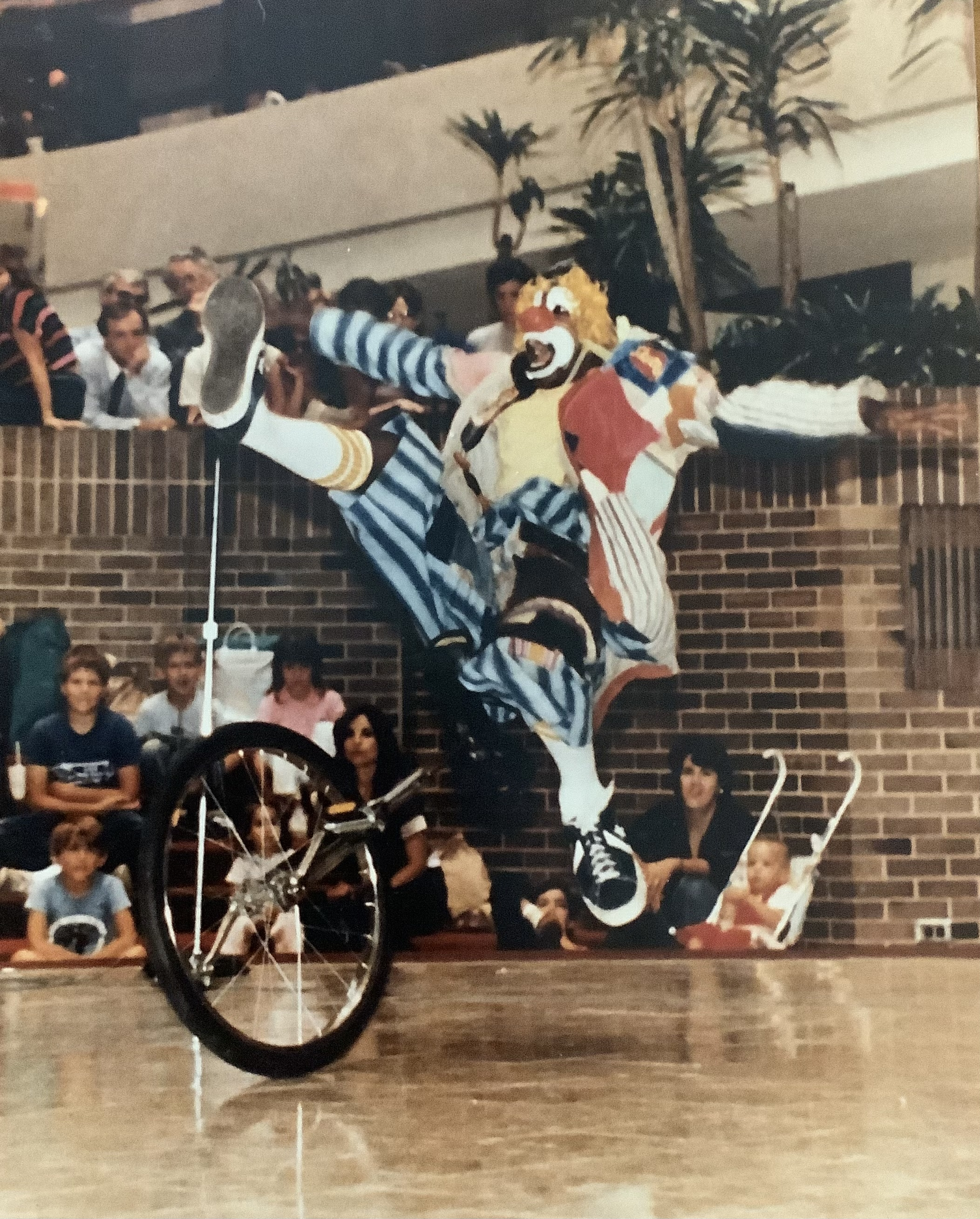
Skeeter Reece, former member of the King Charles Troupe, performs in 1983

- Albuquerque Unicycle Club world's first unicycle hockey club
- The King Charles Troupe, the first African American circus troupe, and one of the longest running acts in Ringling Bros history

=== Known in other fields ===
- Adam Carolla, American comedian and actor
- Rupert Grint, actor who played Ronald Weasley in the Harry Potter films
- Mark Ruffalo, actor
- Mika Häkkinen, Formula One racing driver
- Lewis Hamilton, Formula One racing driver
- Eddie Izzard, comedian and actor
- Leslie Mann, American actress who performed on The Ellen DeGeneres Show
- Chris Martin, lead singer of Coldplay
- Demetri Martin, American comedian and actor
- Ulrich Mühe, late German actor, best known for his role in The Lives of Others
- Michael Nesmith, former guitarist of The Monkees
- Miles Plumlee, American professional basketball player
- Nico Rosberg, Formula One racing driver
- Donald Rumsfeld, former United States Secretary of Defense
- Claude Shannon, founder of information theory
- Take That members Mark Owen, Jason Orange, and Howard Donald unicycled for the circus-based video for their song "Said It All"
- Andrew Tosh, son of Peter and also a Jamaican reggae musician
- Peter Tosh: Jamaican reggae musician from The Wailers
- Steve Young, former National Football League quarterback
- Ilya Zhitomirskiy: Russian-American software developer and entrepreneur

== UNICON and regional championships ==
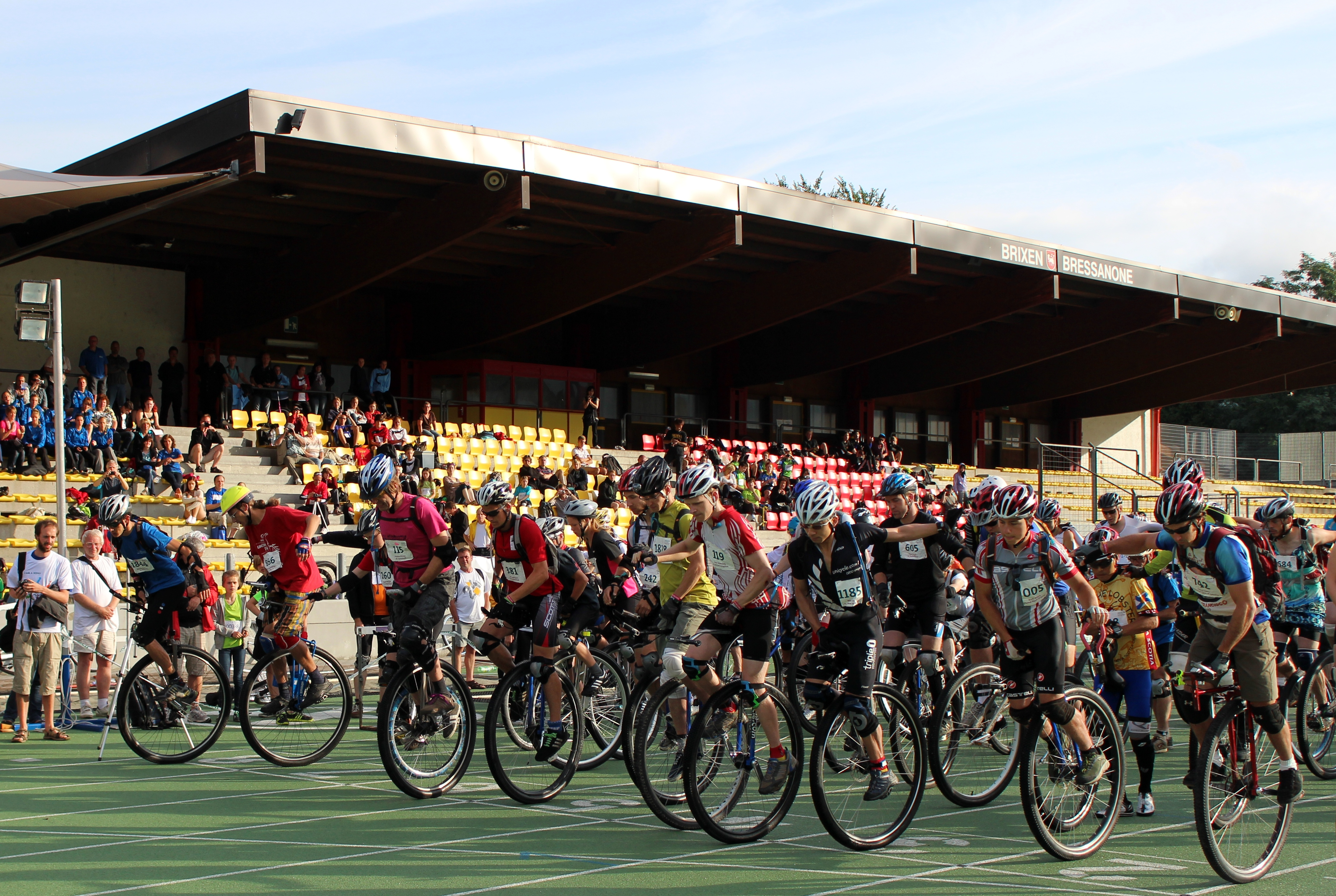
Start of the 100-kilometer (62-mile) race at the UNICON 16 in Brixen in 2012

UNICON, Eurocycle and APUC are regular international unicycling conventions.

The biennial UNICON (International Unicycling Convention), sanctioned by the International Unicycling Federation, comprises all major unicycling disciplines and is a major event on the international unicycling calendar. Events include: artistic (group, pairs, individual, standard skill, open-X), track racing (100 m [110 yd], 400 m [440 yd], 800 m [870 yd], 30 m [33 yd] walk the wheel, 50 m [55 yd] one-foot), IUF slalom, 10 km (6 1/4 miles), marathon (42.195 km or 26 1/4 miles), muni (cross-country, uphill, downhill, North Shore downhill), trials, basketball and hockey.

The Eurocycle (EUROpean uniCYCLE meeting) is a similar convention but based in Europe.

APUC, the Asia Pacific Unicycle Championships, are held biannually, alternately with Unicon. The first APUC, in 2007, was in Singapore. Subsequently, the event has been held in Hong Kong (2009), Seoul (2011), Canberra (2013), and Singapore (2015).

EUC, the Extreme Unicycle Championship, is the convention for urban unicycling (Street, Trials and Flatland). The event is held in two editions: summer and winter. Winter EUC is usually held at Cologne, Germany, while locations of the summer edition vary.

NAUCC, The North American Unicycle Competition and Convention is the annual gathering of North American unicyclists. Unicyclists of all ages join together for competitions in a variety of disciplines, including freestyle, muni (mountain unicycling), road racing, team events, track, and urban. Topping off the week are convention events, including workshops and the Unicycling Society of America annual meeting.

== Races ==
Unicycle Race 2013

The world's first multi-stage unicycle race, Ride the Lobster, took place in Nova Scotia in June 2008. Some 35 teams from 14 countries competed over a total distance of 800 km (500 miles). Each team consisted of a maximum of 3 riders and 1 support person.

Unicross, or unicycle cyclocross is an emerging race format in which unicycles race over a cyclocross course.

== Manufacturers ==
Unicycle makers include:

- Coker
- Impact Unicycles
- Kris Holm Unicycles
- Mad4One
- Miyata
- Nimbus Unicycles
- Torker (formerly)
- Unicycle.com
- Schwinn
- Qu-Ax

== See also ==
- List of land vehicles types by number of wheels
- Bicycle and motorcycle dynamics
- Monowheel
- Self-balancing unicycle
- Uniracers
- Wheel Gym
