= Family of Jeff Bezos =

Family of American businessman Jeff Bezos

- Current region: Florida, Houston, Texas and San Francisco, United States of America
- Members: Miguel Bezos; Jackie Bezos; Jeff Bezos; Ted Jorgensen; Mark Bezos; Lauren Sánchez; MacKenzie Scott

The family of Jeff Bezos, who is an American billionaire businessman, is active in e-commerce, space exploration, and philanthropy. Bezos and his former wife MacKenzie Scott co-founded Amazon.

Jeff's mother and stepfather are the co-founders of the Bezos Family Foundation.

The family members have Danish-American and broader European-American ancestry, while having Mexican American and Cuban heritage through marriage and adoption.

== Notable family members ==
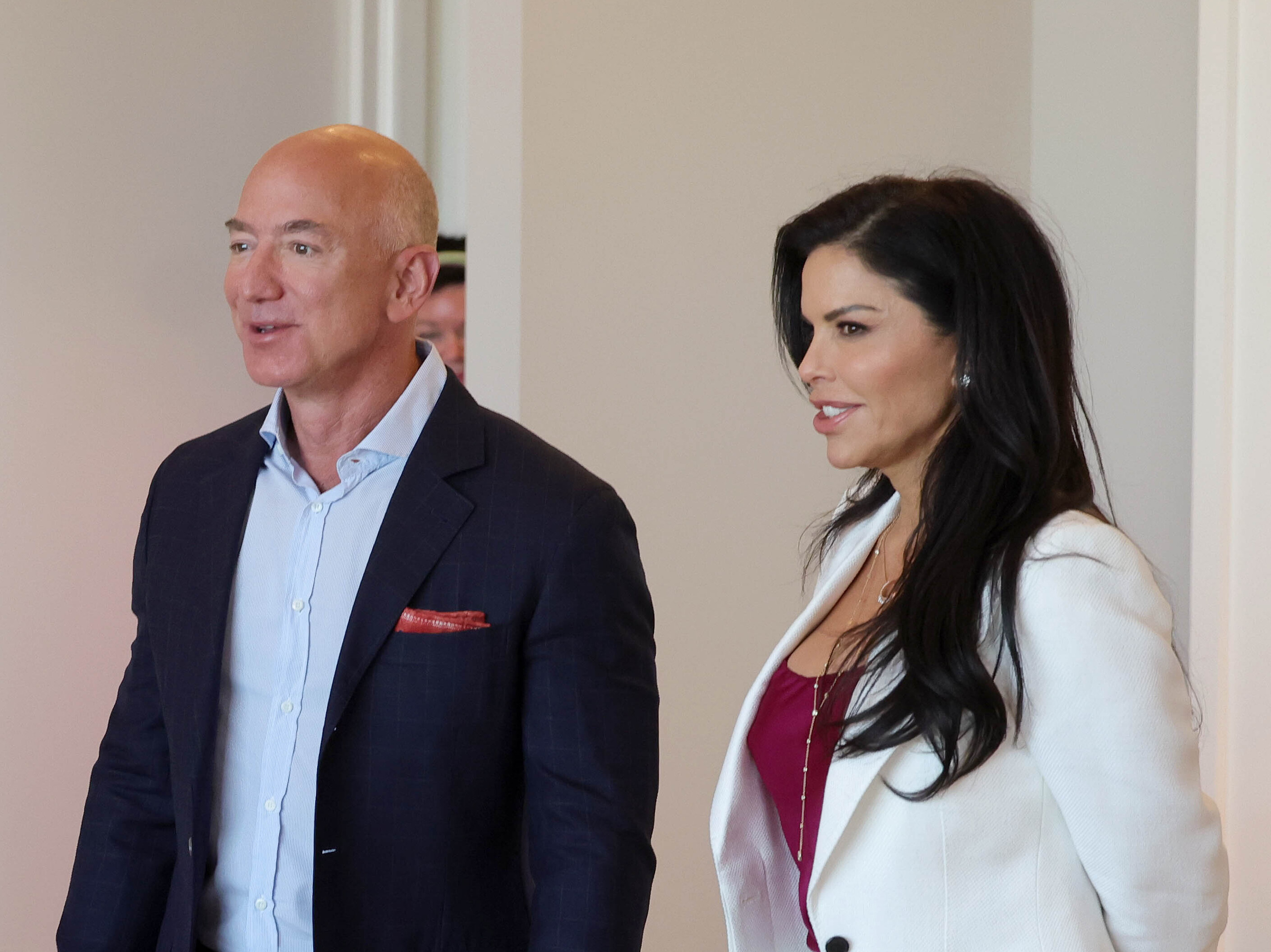
Bezos and his wife Lauren Sánchez Bezos together in September 2025

- Ted Jorgensen (1944–2015) is the Danish-American biological father of Bezos. Jorgensen was a unicycle hockey player as a youth, and a bicycle shop owner as an adult. He left Bezos and his mother when Bezos was an infant.
- Miguel Bezos (born 1945) is the step-father of Jeff Bezos. He was born in Cuba and moved to the United States in 1962. He is the vice-president and the co-founder of the Bezos Family Foundation.
- Jackie Bezos (1946-2025) is the mother of Jeff Bezos. She was married to Jorgensen from 1963 to 1965. She later married Miguel Bezos.
- Mark Bezos (born 1967) is the half brother of Jeff Bezos. He is a space tourist, a volunteer fire fighter, and former advertising executive.
- Lauren Sánchez (born 1969) is Bezos's second and current wife, marrying him in 2025. She is a former journalist and current philanthropist. Sánchez is Mexican-American.
- MacKenzie Scott (born 1970) is the former wife of Bezos, marrying him in 1993 and divorcing him in 2019. Scott is a writer, philanthropist, and co-founder of Amazon.com.

== Other immediate family members ==
Jeff Bezos and MacKenzie are the parents of four children: three sons, and one daughter adopted from China.

Jackie and Miguel are also the parents of Jeff's half sister Christina.

== In popular culture ==
The family features in Brad Stone's 2013 book The Everything Store and in the 2022 biographical film Bezos: The Beginning, directed by Khoa Le. The film was based on the 2021 book Zero to Hero, Bezos: The Beginning (ISBN 979-8709873797).
