= Eurocycle =

Eurocycle is a European unicycle meeting.

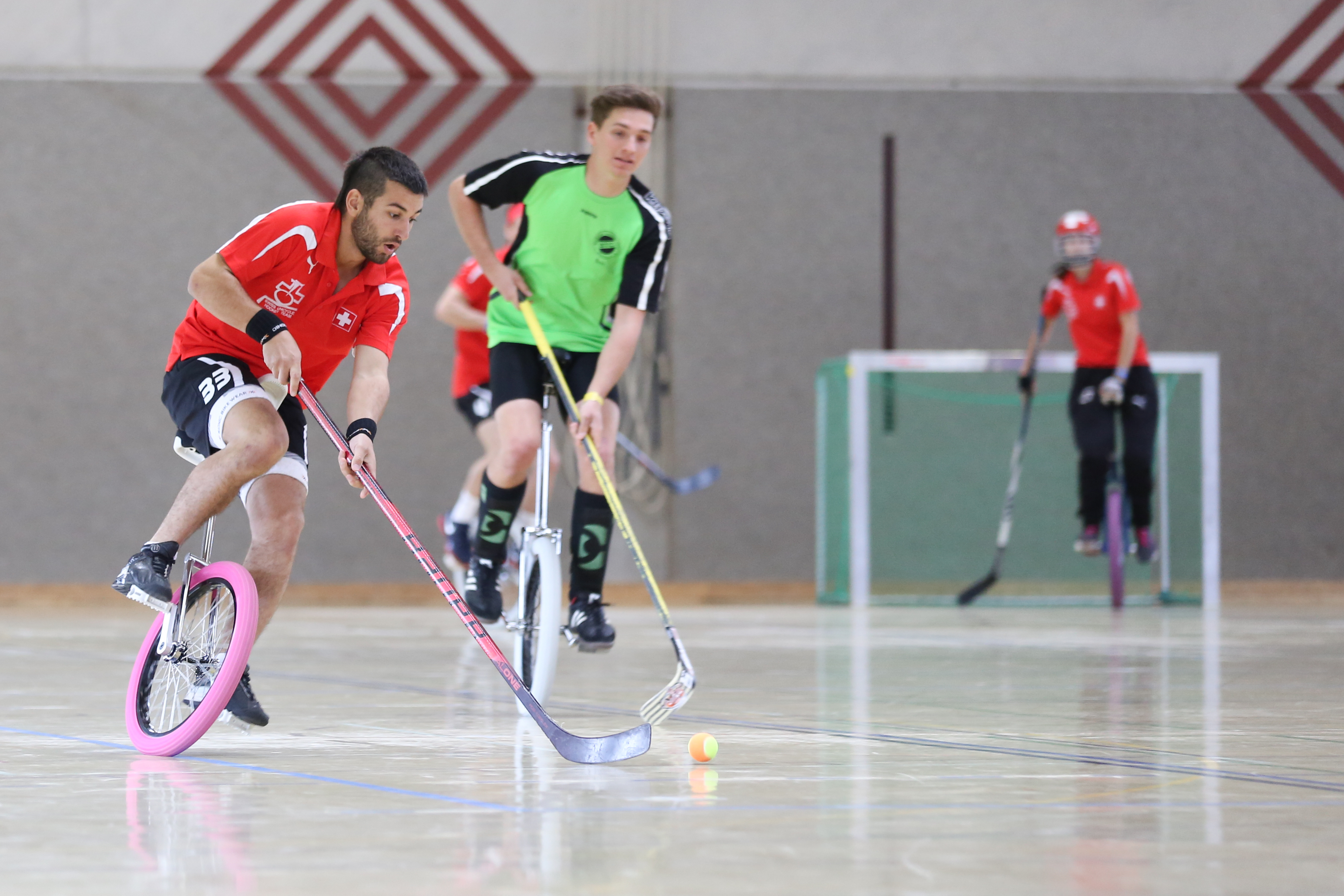
Unicycle hockey final at the Eurocycle 2013

The events offered vary between Eurocycles, they usually include hockey, basketball, races, muni, and artistic.

== Eurocycles to date ==
Eurocycle 2017	30 July to 06 August 2017	Sittard, Netherlands
Eurocycle 2015	1 to 12 August 2015	Mondovì, Italy
Eurocycle 2013	9 to 12 May 2013	Langenthal, Switzerland
Eurocycle 2008	27 to 30 March 2008	Vodice, Croatia
Eurocycle 2006	14 to 18 June 2006	Altenstadt, Swabia/Bellenberg, Germany
Eurocycle 2003	22 to 24 August 2003	Langenfeld, Germany
Eurocycle 2002	31 May - 2 June 2002	Bremen, Germany
Eurocycle 2001	20 to 22 July 2001	Plymouth, United Kingdom
Eurocycle 2000	9 to 12 June 2000	Mörfelden, Germany
Eurocycle 1999	8 to 11 July 1999	Haslev, Denmark
Eurocycle 1997	11 to 13 July 1997	Nyon, Switzerland
Eurocycle 1995	8 to 9 July 1995	Nice, France
Eurocycle 1994	17 to 19 June 1994	Königstein, Germany
Eurocycle 1993	2 to 4 July 1993	Langenfeld, Germany

== See also ==
- International Unicycling Federation
- Unicon world championships
- APUC (Asia Pacific Unicycle Championships)
