= Asia-Pacific Unicycle Competition =

Asia Pacific Unicycle Competition

The Asia-Pacific Unicycle Competition (or APUC for short) is a regional unicycling games event that is held biennially, in alternative years from the Unicycling World Championships Unicon. The event has typically been held over a weekend where competitors from around Asia-Pacific gather in various unicycle games.

== Origins ==
APUC was started as a progression of the somewhat-impromptu unicycle hockey matches that were set up between a travelling Asian/Australasia team and a host team. In 2007, a unicycle hockey competition was formalized and with location support and help from the (now defunct) Ngee Ann Polytechnic Unicycle Club, the first Asia-Pacific Unicycle Competition was held in Singapore.

The Competition lasted a weekend and consisted of a day of Unicycle Hockey with social events and a Taekwondo showcase by the Korean Unicycling Association. The countries that participated included Hong Kong, Australia, South Korea and Singapore.

== Current ==
APUC draws guidance from the unicycle sports offered at the largest international unicycle event, the Unicycling World Championships Unicon. While there is no fixed guidelines as yet to what events are compulsory at each APUC, Unicycle Hockey, Track and Freestyle have been the most-organized competitions. At past APUCs, other competitions have included track and field, muni, a 10 km race, and trials.

A large goal of APUC is in promoting friendship and exchange and social activities form a good portion of the games too. Activities like performance showcases, unicycle sumo and street rides play a large role in shaping the event. Events are conducted based on the rules of the International Unicycling Federation.

== Countries That Have Participated in APUC ==
Countries that have participated in APUC include:

- Australia
- Hong Kong
- Japan
- Philippines
- Singapore
- South Korea
- Taiwan
- Macau

== Competition History ==
Year	Dates	Location
2007	3 November - 4 November	Singapore
2009	21 August - 23 August	Hong Kong
2011	29 July - 1 August	Seoul
2013	12 December - 14 December	Canberra
2015	17 July - 19 July	Singapore
2017	22 July - 24 July	Hong Kong

== See also ==
- Eurocycle (European unicycling championships)
- International Unicycling Federation
