= Brian Halligan =

American businessman

- Education: University of Vermont; MIT Sloan School of Management
- Occupations: Executive, author
- Website: HubSpot Propeller

Brian Halligan is an American executive and author. He is the co-founder and executive chairman of software company HubSpot based in Cambridge, Massachusetts, and is also a senior lecturer at Massachusetts Institute of Technology. Halligan coined the term "inbound marketing" to describe the type of marketing he advocates.

He has co-authored two books on marketing: Inbound Marketing: Get Found Using Google, Social Media, and Blogs with HubSpot co-founder Dharmesh Shah and Marketing Lessons from the Grateful Dead: What Every Business Can Learn from the Most Iconic Band in History with David Meerman Scott.

== Early life and education ==
Halligan was born in Westwood, Massachusetts, and grew up and attended public schools in Westwood, Massachusetts. He received a Bachelor of Science degree in Electrical Engineering from the University of Vermont in 1990 and an MBA from MIT Sloan School of Management in 2005.

== Career ==
His career began at Parametric Technology Corporation in several roles leading up to senior vice president of the Pacific Rim. Wanting to work in a smaller company, he joined Groove Networks as vice president of sales, where he worked from 2000 to 2004 before it was acquired by Microsoft and rebranded as Microsoft SharePoint Workspace.

After a period as a venture partner at Longworth Ventures, he co-founded HubSpot in June 2006. In HubSpot's 2022 Year In Review, the company reported $1.731 billion in total revenue and 5,895 employees with headquarters in Cambridge, Massachusetts, and offices in Dublin, Ireland (EMEA HQ), Berlin, Singapore, Sydney, Tokyo, Japan, Portsmouth, New Hampshire, and San Francisco. He credits the company's success, in part, to innovations like the "Alpha, Beta, Version One" policy, in which employees begin proving their ideas might profit the company "nights and weekends" (the alpha phase) before receiving additional resources (the beta and version one phases). He stepped down as CEO of HubSpot after being injured in a snowmobile accident in 2021.

He is a senior lecturer at MIT teaching "Designing, Developing, and Launching Successful Products in an Entrepreneurial Environment". He previously taught "Scaling Entrepreneurial Ventures" at MIT.

Halligan is a corporation member of the Woods Hole Oceanographic Institution. From 2014 to 2016, Halligan served on the board of directors of Fleetmatics until it was acquired by Verizon.

In 2022 Halligan also founded Propeller Ventures and directs a $100 million climate tech venture fund specializing in ocean innovation investments. Brian is also a senior advisor at Sequoia Capital where he coaches startup founders.

== Publications, speeches, and awards ==
Halligan's first book, Inbound Marketing, was co-authored with HubSpot co-founder Dharmesh Shah. They coined the term “inbound marketing” and built a movement around the concept which included organizing the INBOUND conference. The thesis of the book is that because people block marketing that interrupts them, such as advertisements and spam, companies need to instead provide information that is useful to prospects, who will then self-identify. Reviewing the book, Meryl Evans said that it contains "elementary stuff..." but it "does a good job for those who don’t have a clue about how to use social media for business". As of July 2011, the book was in its seventh printing, had sold 40,000 copies, and had been translated into nine languages.

With co-author David Meerman Scott, Halligan (right) on the Marketing Lessons... book tour. The background photo montage includes Jerry Garcia, co-founder of The Grateful Dead.

His second book, Marketing Lessons from the Grateful Dead, was co-authored with David Meerman Scott. It uses the marketing activities of the rock band The Grateful Dead as an example of this. Scott Kirsner, reviewing this book in The Boston Globe, mentions that the authors say that they were inspired, in part, by an article in The Atlantic by Joshua Green. In 2017, Halligan purchased the "Wolf" guitar once owned by lead guitarist/vocalist Jerry Garcia for $1.9M at a charity auction. An anonymous donor made an additional donation of $1.6M and so the total benefit the Southern Poverty Law Center was $3.5M. He is also co-authoring a Harvard Business Review case study on the group.

Halligan speaks on marketing and business topics, including at TEDx.

He is also an occasional lecturer at Sloan on the science of selling and marketing. MIT Sloan honored Halligan in 2023 with the Monosson Prize.

== Daniel Lyons incidents ==
In his book Disrupted: My Misadventure in the Start Up Bubble, which is sharply critical of HubSpot's management and culture, former HubSpot employee Daniel Lyons accused Halligan of age discrimination.

Materials obtained under the Freedom of Information Act showed that certain HubSpot executives working under Halligan considered the book "a financial threat to HubSpot, its share price, and the company’s future potential". The FBI report discussed "tactics such as email hacking and extortion" in an attempt to prevent the book from being published.

Halligan was forced to pay financial penalties by the HubSpot board of directors because he failed to promptly alert the board after he discovered that staff members at HubSpot behaved inappropriately. "There was definitely some fishiness. But I didn’t report it. That was my bad," Halligan said about the incident.
