= Bezos (surname) =

Bezos is a Spanish and Greek surname. It most commonly refers to Jeff Bezos (born 1964), an American entrepreneur, industrialist, media proprietor, investor, and the former chief executive officer of Amazon.

Other notable people with the surname include:

- Giannis Bezos (born 1956), Greek actor, director and comedian
- Jackie Bezos (1946–2025), American philanthropist; mother of Jeff Bezos
- Lauren Sánchez Bezos (born 1969), American philanthropist and former journalist; wife of Jeff Bezos
- MacKenzie Scott (formerly MacKenzie Scott Bezos; born 1970), American novelist, philanthropist, and ex-wife of Jeff Bezos
- Mark Bezos (born 1968), American businessman, investor and commercial astronaut; brother of Jeff Bezos
- Miguel Bezos (born 1945), Cuban-born American businessman and philanthropist
