= Upstart =

Upstart or upstarts may refer to:

- HMS Upstart, a Royal Navy U-class submarine
- Upstart (company), an online lending marketplace
- Upstart (software), a process management daemon used in several operating systems.
- Upstart (sculpture), a public art work at the Lynden Sculpture Garden near Milwaukee
- Upstart (horse), winner of the Dicken Medal
- Angelic Upstarts, British punk band
- Upstarts (comics), a group of comic book characters
- Upstarts (film), a 2019 Indian film
- The Upstarts, a 2017 book by Brad Stone
- The Upstart, a 1998 novel by Catherine Cookson
- Upstart Associates, an artists' studio formed by four well-known comics artists

== See also ==
- Startup (disambiguation)
