= Shel Kaphan =

First employee of Amazon

- Born: 1952 or 1953 (age 72–73)
- Education: University of California, Santa Cruz (BS)
- Occupation: Computer programmer
- Employer: Amazon (1994–1999)
- Organization: Kaphan Foundation

Shel Kaphan is an American computer programmer who was the first employee of technology company Amazon. Working there from 1994 to 1999, he co-wrote the first Amazon website, wrote the product review system, and contributed to 1-Click. Amazon founder Jeff Bezos described Kaphan as "the most important person ever in the history of Amazon.com," and Brad Stone wrote in his book about Amazon, The Everything Store, that "Kaphan was an introverted hacker with an idealistic streak and little intuitive leadership ability."

== Personal life ==
Kaphan grew up in the San Francisco Bay Area. As a teenager he was interested in computers and would use the ARPANET. He met the writer Stewart Brand as a teenager and started working for his Whole Earth Catalog, a counterculture publication. There he worked in the lending library and education service Whole Earth Truck Store in Menlo Park. As of 2011 he lives with his long-term girlfriend, and acts as an advisor to the Grameen tech center in Seattle.

== Career ==
In 1975, Kaphan began his career as a progammer at Information International, Inc., where he worked until he decided to finish his education at UC Santa Cruz in 1978. After graduating with a bachelor's degree in mathematics, he worked at several companies in the Bay Area, including Xerox and Kaleida Labs. In Spring 1994, he resigned from Kaleida Labs and began talking with a friend about starting a business venture together. Through his friend's professional connections, Kaphan met Jeff Bezos, who was preparing to create Amazon.

After meeting with Bezos, Kaphan was interested in working with him because they shared an interest in creating new web technologies. In a 2011 interview, Kaphan said that Bezos made a good first impression and came across as a "really intelligent and focused person [...] who was going to be able to make whatever he got involved with into a success." He also stated that he liked the idea of using an online book store to provide information to remote locations which otherwise might have difficulty obtaining information. He was initially skeptical about Amazon's ability to succeed and reluctant to leave his long-time residence of Santa Cruz, but Bezos convinced him to move to Seattle and hired him as Vice President of Research and Development. He wrote the company's first website with another employee, wrote the website's product review system, and helped create 1-Click. In 1997 he became Chief Technology Officer, which did not act as a promotion as he had no direct responsibilities and acted as an advisor. According to Kaphan, Bezos asked him if he wanted the job, to which he said he did not, and Bezos gave him the job without choice. Kaphan described Bezos moving him away from hands on work as "a betrayal of a sacred trust" and "one of the biggest disappointments of my entire life". After his stock payments ended in 1999, he stopped coming to the office and resigned later that year.

In 2005, Kaphan founded the Kaphan Foundation, a non-profit organization which primarily funds grants for left-of-center leaning causes, and serves as its president.

== Views of Amazon ==
Towards the end of Kaphan's time at Amazon, his opinion of the company grew more negative and his relationship with Bezos deteriorated, having gone from initially living with Bezos and his wife for a short time upon first moving to Seattle, to feeling a "bitter resentment" about his years at Amazon. As a celebration of Kaphan's four-year anniversary with the company, Bezos surprised him by planning a weekend vacation in Hawaii for him and his family. He felt uncomfortable that weekend, "like the guy getting the gold watch who has not retired yet." According to Kaphan, Bezos seemed largely indifferent when he officially tendered his resignation. Bezos said he was sorry Kaphan felt the need to quit, but otherwise made no attempt to convince him to stay. Since then, he and Bezos do not speak and are not on good terms with each other.

After leaving Amazon, Kaphan mostly stayed out of the public eye, only occasionally agreeing to be interviewed, and preferred not to talk much about his career at Amazon or his opinions of Bezos and the company as a whole. However, he changed his mind in 2019 upon reading Roger McNamee's exposé Zucked, and decided he had a responsibility to speak up and publicly air his grievances. In February 2020, Kaphan was interviewed as part of an episode of the PBS program Frontline, in which he stated, "I am proud of what [Amazon] became, but it also scares me." He characterized the company as both a monopoly and a monopsony — in his words, "If you want to buy something, you go to Amazon because that's where all the products are; if you want to sell something, you go to Amazon because that's where all the customers are" — and stated he believes it is taking advantage of the system and has no plans to stop. When asked about proposals for federal intervention to break up Amazon, he replied that they "could potentially make sense" and compared Amazon to Standard Oil and Bell Telephone Company in terms of scale. Relating to these concerns, he suggested that individuals might be deterred from starting up a business due to a "justifiable fear that they might not be able to hold onto their businesses" because they cannot compete with Amazon's size and scale. He also expressed concerns that Amazon is not interested in adding necessary oversight to its services, specifically criticizing their Ring doorbell cameras for sharing video with police.
