= Ted Jorgensen =

American unicyclist (1944–2015)

- Jorgensen c. 1962
- Born: Theodore John Jorgensen Jr. October 10, 1944; Chicago, Illinois, U.S.
- Died: March 16, 2015 (aged 70); Phoenix, Arizona, U.S.
- Education: University of New Mexico
- Occupations: Unicycle hockey player; entrepreneur
- Employers: Ringling Bros. and Barnum & Bailey Circus; Globe Store
- Organization(s): Albuquerque Unicycle Club (president, 1962)
- Spouses: Jacklyn Gise (m. 1963; div. 1965) Linda Fischer (m. 1988)
- Children: 5, (Note: 1 biological with Jackie Gise (Jeff Bezos) and 4 stepsons with Linda Jorgensen) including Jeff Bezos

Theodore John Jorgensen Jr. (October 10, 1944 – March 16, 2015) was an American unicycle hockey player, the president of the world's first unicycle hockey club, and a bicycle shop owner-operator. He was the biological father of e‑commerce magnate Jeff Bezos.

Jorgensen was born in Chicago to a Danish-American family that moved to Albuquerque when he was a teenager. Jorgensen was a unicyclist who performed at the Ringling Bros. and Barnum & Bailey Circus, and in 1962 became the president of Albuquerque Unicycle Club, the world's first unicycle hockey club. He married Jackie Gise in 1963 and fathered Jeff with her in 1964, before divorcing when Jeff was seventeen months old. After the separation, Jorgensen agreed to not contact either of them.

Jorgensen owned a bicycle shop in Glendale, Arizona, and was married to his second wife, Linda. In 2012, journalist Brad Stone informed Jorgensen that his biological son was an e-commerce billionaire, something Stone had discovered while doing research for his book, The Everything Store. Jorgensen died in 2015.

== Early life and circus career ==
Theodore John Jorgensen Jr. was born into a Baptist family in 1943 or 1944 in Chicago and grew up with his younger brother Gordon. His paternal grandfather was a Danish veteran of the Spanish-American War. After his father took a purchasing job at Sandia National Laboratories, the family moved to Bernalillo, New Mexico, while the boys were in elementary school.

As a teenager and young adult, Jorgensen was both a hobby and professional unicyclist, competing in unicycle hockey as part of the Albuquerque Unicycle Club, the world's first unicycle hockey club.

He became vice president of the club in 1959, won the club's award for "most versatile rider" in 1961 and took over as club president in 1962.

On 16 and 17 February 1963, he was part of the Unicycle Wranglers circus troupe that performed at the Greater New Mexico Sports Show at the Tingley Coliseum. He also performed for the Ringling Bros. and Barnum & Bailey Circus and, in 1965, for the Rude Brothers Circus. The same year, he unsuccessfully auditioned for The Ed Sullivan Show.

== Family life and education ==
In high school, Jorgensen dated Jackie Gise. She became pregnant in 1963 when Jorgensen was 18 and she was 16, shortly before they got married in Ciudad Juárez, Mexico. They had a second ceremony in the United States on July 19 the same year. Gise gave birth to Jeff Bezos on January 12, 1964, two weeks after Gise's 17th birthday. They named the child Jeffrey Preston Jorgensen at birth.

Jorgensen was an alcoholic and struggled financially. He supplemented his circus income by working at the Globe department store while studying at the University of New Mexico. His academic fees were paid by Gise's father, who also worked with Jorgensen's father at Sandia. Gise left Jorgensen to live with her parents, filing for divorce in June 1965 when Jeff was seventeen months old. Gise's new husband Miguel Bezos, with Jorgensen's support, adopted Jeff. Gise and her husband and son left that area and asked Jorgensen to discontinue contact, to which he agreed, relinquishing custody.

== Later life and death ==
In his twenties, Jorgensen moved to Hollywood, Los Angeles, to open a bicycle shop, before moving to Tucson, Arizona. In 1972, he was struck in the face with a stick while being robbed, breaking his jaw. After moving to Phoenix in 1974, Jorgensen opened a bicycle retail establishment. He later relocated the Roadrunner Bike Center to Glendale, Arizona. Around 1988, Jorgensen married his second wife, Linda, who had four sons with a previous partner. Jorgensen's stepsons Darin and Todd Fala both worked at his bicycle repair shop.

In 2012, journalist and author Brad Stone contacted Jorgensen after identifying him as billionaire Jeff Bezos's biological father while researching for his upcoming book The Everything Store, which was published in 2013. Jorgensen had forgotten Jeff's adopted surname and had been unaware how his son grew up until then. "I wasn't a good father or husband," Jorgensen told Stone during their meeting. One year after learning who his son was, Jorgensen had not reconnected with Bezos. In 2014, he spoke on Inside Edition about his desire to apologize to Bezos.

As a lifelong smoker, Jorgensen had heart problems and emphysema. He died in Phoenix, Arizona, on March 16, 2015, aged 70.

== See also ==
- Bezos family
