= Unicycle time trial records =

Performances not set in unicycle competitions

Unicycle time trial records are performances that are not set in unicycle competitions. They require a separate organization. The unicycles used for these records generally belong to the "unlimited" category. In other words, there are no limits on wheel size, crank length or frame shape. The only rule is that they must have a single wheel and no motorized assistance (This article does not cover electric unicycles).

These records are partly due to technological innovations: 36" wheels (the first brand was Coker), geared hubs (the best known being the Schlumpf), the use of handlebars and clipless pedals...

== Certification ==
Several organisations can recognise unicycle world records. This article is limited to records recognised by the International Unicycle Federation (IUF) and the Guinness World Records (GWR).

=== Guinness world records ===
The GWR has only recognised male records: hour record, 100-mile record and 24-hour record. New records can be added on request. The criteria for Guinness World Records may differ from those of the IUF. For example: the hour record should be set on an athletics track, the 100-mile record on an ungeared unicycle.

=== International Unicycling Federation ===
The IUF recognizes four types of time trial records: hour record, 100 km record, 100-mile record and 24 h record. Since 2011 these records have been approved by the International Unicycle Federation. Previously, the records were usually entered in the Guinness Book of Records.

== Hour record ==
The hour record is an event that consists of covering the greatest possible distance in one hour. Unlike the cycling hour record, it does not have to be achieved in a velodrome, in fact, it is almost impossible to ride a unicycle in a velodrome.

=== The first hour records ===
The first unicycle hour record dates back to the origins of unicycling: in 1888, Bert Myers, in Peoria (Illinois), is said to have covered 13 miles and 5098 feet (22.475 km) on the front wheel of his Penny-farthing "Light Champion" (a 48–60" wheel).

The first men's hour record to be approved by the Guinness World Records dates back to 1997, with a performance of 9 miles (just under 15 km) on a 24" unicycle. A few years later, Stephan Gauler improved the mark with a 26" unicycle (a first series of 26" unicycles was first produced in the 1990s), but due to a lack of documentation, the record could not be certify by GWR.

=== 36" unicycles with pneumatic tires ===
In 1998, the Coker brand, named after its founder David Coker, produced the first 36" tubeless tire and the first mass-produced unicycle equipped with this 36" tire.

This technological innovation revitalized long-distance unicycling. Previously, there had been very few enthusiasts, despite the existence of large wheels with solid tires. However, it was not until several years later that the one-hour record was beaten with a 36" unicycle. From 2005 onwards, record after record was set on unicycles with 36" wheels.

On February 5, 2005, Ken Looi set a new 24h record with a first hour achieved at over 25 km/h. Three weeks later, Pete Perron completed his hour record attempt with a customized geared unicycle (Purple Phaze), unaware that Guinness would subsequently certify the distance covered by Ken Looi in the first hour of his 24h record. From 2005 onwards, all records have been set on unicycles with 36" wheels.

=== The domination of the Schlumpf hub ===
The first unicycle speed hub for mass production was prototyped in 2004. The first unicyclists were able to test it in 2005. This hub is equipped with 2 gears: a normal gear (1 wheel revolution for 1 pedal revolution) and a geared gear with a ratio of 17/11 (i.e. approximately 1.55 wheel revolutions per pedal revolution). Shifting gears is generally done by tapping a button protruding from the wheel axle, one on each side.

On October 10, 2008, Jan Logemann was the first to break the record with a Schlumpf geared 36" unicycle. Since then, all records have been broken with a 36" unicycle geared with a Schlumpf hub.

On September 18, 2009, Ken Looi improved the record by over 2.4 km, just 7 meters short of the 30 km mark. This was the last Guinness-approved one-hour record achieved on an athletics track.

On August 8, 2014 (almost 5 years later), during UNICON 17 in Montreal, Christoph Hartmann rode 32.230 km, beating the previous record by plus 2.2 km on Circuit Gilles Villeneuve (the circuit on which the UNICON marathon was held and where he finished 2nd behind Scott Wilton). He became the first rider to take the hour record beyond 30 km.

On May 1, 2020, on the Rodgau-Dudenhofen speed ring, Jana Tenambergen became the first woman to hold the hour record for any gender.

It took another 7 years for the men's record to be improved. On October 10, 2021, Simon Jan took the hour record to 33.365 km, beating by less than 200 m the record set by Jana Tenambergen a year earlier.

The last 4 records have all been achieved on unicycles with 36" wheels and Schlumpf hubs. The evolution of the record can be explained by the optimization of peripherals (lighter tires and rims, use of automatic pedals), position (more comfortable and aerodynamic) and the choice of course to avoid sharp turns.

=== Record evolution ===
==== Male ====
Date	Rider	Distance	Wheel	Gear	Cranks	Location	Circuit	Certification
1997	???	~ 9 miles	24″	no				GWR
2000	(Switzerland) Stefan Gauler	21.29 km	26″	no	125 mm			none
February 5, 2005	(New Zealand) Ken Looi	25.6 km	36"	no	102mm	Wellington, New Zealand	465 m	GWR
February 26, 2005	(United States) Pete Perron	22.978 km	36"	geared (1:1.89) Purple Phaze			385 m	none
July 9, 2006	(Netherlands) Dustin Schaap	25.9 km	36"	no		Alkmaar, Netherlands		
July 26, 2006	(Switzerland) Patrick Schmid	27.18 km	36"	no	114 mm	Langenthal, Switzerland	400 m	
October 10, 2008	(Germany) Jan Logemann	27.564 km	36"	Schlumpf		Bergneustadt, Germany	400 m track ?	
September 18, 2009	(New Zealand) Ken Looi	29.993 km	36"	Schlumpf		Dubbo, Australia	406.55 m track (74 laps)	GWR
September 8, 2014	(Germany) Christoph Hartmann	32.23 km	36"	Schlumpf		Circuit Gilles Villeneuve	4361 m	IUF
October 10, 2021	(France) Simon Jan	33.365 km	36″	Schlumpf	145 mm	Dol-de-Bretagne, France	8152.20 m road loop (5 laps)	IUF

==== Female ====
Date	Rider	Distance (km)	Wheel	Gear	Cranks	Location	Circuit	Certification
October 10, 2008	(Germany) Nadine Wegner	23.659 km	28"	geared (1:2,5)		Bergneustadt, Germany	400 m track ?	ODM 2008
July 29, 2016	(Switzerland) Mirjam Lips	27.027 km	29"	Schlumpf		San Sebastian, Spain	400 m track	IUF
May 1, 2020	(Germany) Jana Tenambergen	33.186 km	36″	Schlumpf		Rodgau-Dudenhofen, Germany	Opel speed ring	IUF

== 24-hour record ==
The 24-hour record is an event that consists in covering the greatest possible distance in 24 hours. This event is generally run on an athletics track (about 400 m).

=== Record evolution ===
==== Male ====
Date	Rider	Distance	Wheel	Gear	Cranks	Location	Circuit	Certification
September 26–27, 1991	(Switzerland) Stefan Gauler	279.3 km	26″	no	130 mm	Kreuzlingen, Switzerland		
2002	(United States) Lars Clausen	326.2 km	36"	no				GWR
February 5-6, 2005	(New Zealand) Ken Looi	378.7 km	36"	no	102mm & 110mm	Wellington, New Zealand	465 m	GWR & IUF
September 29–30, 2007	(United Kingdom) Sam Wakeling	453.8 km	36″	no	90 mm & 102 mm	Aberystwyth, Wales	~400m	GWR & IUF
January 18, 2025	(New Zealand) Ken Looi	455.235km	36"	no	100 mm	Wellington, New Zealand	390.76 m	IUF & GWR
August 29-30, 2025	(Germany) Timo Hirschmann	526.807 km	36"	Schlumpf	127 mm	Wasserburg_am_Inn, Germany	430.0472 m	IUF

==== Female ====
Date	Rider	Distance	Wheel	Gear	Cranks	Location	Circuit	Certification
September 14-15, 2012	(Germany) Ana Schrödinger	247.248 km	36"	no	125mm	Pocking, Germany		IUF
September 15–16, 2016	(Switzerland) Mirjam Lips	312 km	29″	Schlumpf	125 mm	Pocking, Germany		IUF
June 20–21, 2025	(Netherlands) Lisanne Boer	412.147 km	36″	no	100 mm	Lelystad, the Netherlands		IUF
August 29-30, 2025	(Germany) Lena Freimuth	424.414km	29"	Schlumpf	117mm	Wasserburg_am_Inn, Germany	400m	IUF

== 100k record ==
The 100 km record is a race to cover 100 km as quickly as possible.

This record is not the most hotly contested. Among the males, on July 9, 2015, on the occasion of his 100-mile record attempt on the Croft Circuit (3423m) in Darlington, Sam Wakeling set the reference mark in 3h37min45sec. In the female category, on September 19, 2020, Mirjam Lips came close to beating the men's record at Emmen military airport in Switzerland, taking just 8 minutes longer to complete the 100 km.

=== Record evolution ===
==== Male ====
Date	Rider	Time	Wheel	Gear	Cranks	Location	Circuit	Certification
July 9, 2015	(United Kingdom) Sam Wakeling	3h 37' 45"	36″	Schlumpf	145 mm	Darlington, United Kingdom		IUF

==== Female ====
Date	Rider	Time	Wheel	Gear	Cranks	Location	Circuit	Certification
September 19, 2020	(Switzerland) Mirjam Lips	3h 45' 53"	32″	Schlumpf	130 mm	Emmen, Switzerland		IUF

== 100-mile record ==
The 100-mile record is an event that involves covering 100 miles (160.934 km) as quickly as possible.

=== The '80s ===
The 100-mile record was undoubtedly the most contested time trial record in the 80s, during which time it was improved several times. These records were achieved on 40" (or bigger) unicycles with a solid tire.

The first record was set in 1980 by Jack Halpern in 11h26. He was the first president of the Japanese Unicycle Association, which was a turning point for unicycling in Japan. In the same year, Cathy Fox improved all-sex record to 10h37. The following year, John Severin improved the record to 9h20min53. In 1985, Floyd Beattie took the record under 8 hours. In 1987, Takayuki Koike went under 7h (6h44) without setting foot on ground. This is the best performance ever achieved with an ungeared unicycle, and is still the current 100-mile WR in the Guinness Book of Records.

=== The 21st century ===
Interest in the 100-mile record seems to have waned after 1987.

Between 2005 and 2012, there were at least 4 unsuccessful attempts (Ken Looi, Zach Warren, Sam Wakeling and Phil).

It took Sam Wakeling 28 years to improve the male record by 26 minutes. This record, achieved on a geared 36" unicycle with pneumatic tires, was homologated by the IUF. Two years later, Mirjam Lips improved the female record (by over 2h30) on a 29" geared unicycle.

=== Record evolution ===
==== Male ====
Date	Rider	Time	Wheel	Gear	Cranks	Location	Circuit	Certification
1980	(Japan) Jack Halpern	11h 26'	42"	no				GWR
January 10, 1981	(United States) John Severin	9h 20' 53"	???	no				GWR
August 25, 1985	(United States) Floyd Beattie	7h 53' 55"	40"	no		Hocking River bike path		GWR
August 9, 1987	(Japan) Takayuki Koike	6h 44' 21"	42"	no		Japan		GWR
July 9, 2015	(United Kingdom) Sam Wakeling	6h 18' 39"	36″	Schlumpf	145 mm	Croft Circuit	1823 m	IUF

==== Female ====
Date	Rider	Time	Wheel	Gear	Cranks	Location	Circuit	Certification
1980	(United States) Cathy Fox	10h 37'	40"	no				
September 17, 2017	(Switzerland) Mirjam Lips	7h 53' 19"	29″	Schlumpf	125 mm	Pocking, Germany		IUF
June 20, 2025	(Netherlands) Lisanne Boer	7h 35' 4"	36″	no	100 mm	Lelystad, the Netherlands		IUF

== See also ==
- Unicycle
- International Unicycling Federation
