= APUC =

APUC may refer to:

- Advanced Procurement for Universities and Colleges, the Scottish universities' procurement consortium
- Acharya Pre University College, Bengaluru, India
- Asia-Pacific Unicycle Competition
- Association for the Promotion of the Unity of Christendom
