= Bezus =

Bezus is a surname. Notable people with the surname include:

- Dmitri Bezus (born 1989), Ukrainian kickboxer
- Roman Bezus (born 1990), Ukrainian footballer

== See also ==
- Bezos (surname)
