= Twitoaster =

Twitter web application

- Website type: Twitter web application
- Available in: English
- Owner: Arnaud Meunier
- Creator: Arnaud Meunier
- Website: twitoaster.com
- Registration: Required
- Launched: Early 2009
- Current status: Inactive

Twitoaster was a Twitter web application that threaded and archived users' conversations in real time. It was often used by journalists, bloggers or companies who need to collect, organize and keep a track of their Twitter mentions.

== History ==
The service started in early 2009 as an experimental tool to help its creator, Arnaud Meunier, by efficiently handling his Twitter conversations. It was then quickly brought to ReadWriteWeb's attention as a solution for gathering replies to their poll tweets. But the service only became widely known when the New York Times columnist David Pogue used it to compile tweets for his book The World According to Twitter.

In September 2009, Mashable and Microsoft Bizspark showcased Twitoaster as a promising new software company in their Spark of Genius series: "The combination of search, archiving, analytics and visual way of better following conversation threads makes Twitoaster a great tool for any Twitter user’s toolbox."

It was announced that on March 20, 2011, the service would be shut down leaving only read access to the website active.

== Description ==
Twitoaster groups replies and retweets with the tweets that inspired them, displaying Threaded discussions rather than disjointed tweets. All these conversations are archived and indexed in a conversational search engine. The service also provides analytics and statistics, showing for example, how many replies a Twitter member is generating and what day of the week, or time of day, seems to produce the most replies.

Twitoaster also provides an open API that allows third party application (websites, widgets...) to use its data and services. For example, the Twitter Comments wordpress plugin uses the Twitoaster API to give Blog's readers the possibility to send comments via Twitter.
