= Albuquerque Unicycle Club =

U.S. unicycle hockey club

- Formation: March 21, 1958; 68 years ago
- Dissolved: 2001
- Type: Non-profit
- Headquarters: Albuquerque, New Mexico
- Founding chairman: Richard Wright
- Key people: Ted Jorgensen

The Albuquerque Unicycle Club Inc was the world's first unicycle hockey club.

The New Mexico, U.S. club was informally founded in 1957 and officially registered in 1958, before becoming defunct in 2001.

== History ==
The club was informally founded in 1957, and officially registered as a non-profit organization on March 21, 1958, with Richard Wright elected as the club's initial president. Officers of the club were Richard Miller (vice president), Mary Webster (secretary), Percy Pinkerton (treasurer), and Ted Jorgensen (sergeant-at-arms). Jorgensen became vice president of the club in 1959 and took over as the president in 1962. The club operated out of the Schwinn Bicycle retailer Loyd's Bicycle Shop, owned by Loyd W. Smith. Membership grew to 26 by 1960, the club's third year.

The club was the first unicycle hockey club both in the United States, and the world.

At the New Mexico State Fair in 1958, the club won the Most Comical award for the second time.

The club became defunct in 2001.

== Notable members ==
- Robert Williams (artist)
- Ted Jorgensen
