= Mark Bezos =

American space tourist

- Born: Marcus Jim Bezos c. 1967 (age 57–58)
- Education: Texas Christian University
- Occupation: Advertising executive
- Spouse: Lisa Bezos
- Children: 4
- Parents: Miguel Bezos (father); Jackie Bezos (mother)
- Relatives: Jeff Bezos (half-brother)
- Space career

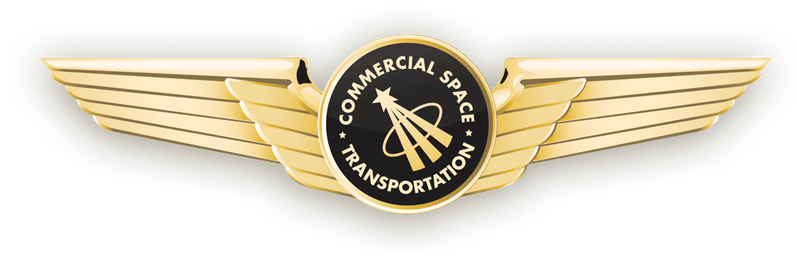
Commercial Astronaut
- Flight time: 10m 18s
- Selection: Blue Origin
- Missions: NS-16

Marcus Jim Bezos (/ˈbeɪzoʊs/ BAY-zohss; born c. 1967) is an American space tourist and former advertising executive. He is the half-brother of Jeff Bezos, the founder of Amazon, with whom he flew to the edge of space as part of the Blue Origin NS-16 mission on July 20, 2021.

== Early life ==
Mark was born to parents Jackie and Miguel Bezos and has an older sister, Christina. He is three years younger than his half-brother Jeff. Mark grew up in Albuquerque, New Mexico; Houston, Texas; and Pensacola, Florida. He finished high school in Norway at the International School of Stavanger. He graduated from Texas Christian University in 1992.

== Career ==
After graduation, he worked in the advertising industry, including positions at Saatchi & Saatchi and DDB. His own agency Bezos–Nathonson, founded in 1999, was bought by EastWest Creative in 2005. From 2006 to 2016, he was head of communications at the Robin Hood Foundation, earning $140,000 to $240,000 per year as Robin Hood's communications director, which is supported by his brother and other members of his family. He founded a private equity firm in 2019.

As of July 2021, he is a director of the Bezos Family Foundation. He owns an unknown stake in his brother's company Amazon; $10,000 worth of shares he bought in 1996 were estimated to be worth $640 million in 2018.

== Personal life ==
He is married with four children and lives in Scarsdale, New York, where he is also a volunteer firefighter.

== Spaceflight ==
On July 20, 2021, he flew to the edge of space alongside his brother Jeff, Wally Funk and Oliver Daemen, aboard the Blue Origin NS-16 flight. The suborbital flight lasted over 10 minutes, reaching a peak altitude of 66.5 miles (107.0 km).

== See also ==
- Family of Jeff Bezos
