= Laura Fitton =

- Born: Laura Fitton; 1972 (age 53–54)
- Education: Cornell University
- Employer: the enough company
- Known for: Founder, Oneforty; co-Author, Twitter for Dummies

Laura Fitton is the founder of Twitter app store, oneforty and the co-Author of Twitter for Dummies.

== Career ==
Fitton is the founder of the Twitter app store oneforty which was acquired by HubSpot in August 2011.

In 2010 she was listed in Fast Company as one of the Most Influential Women in Technology, and by Huffington Post as a Female Founder to Watch in Twitter.

In 2011 she received PepsiCo's Women's Inspiration Network award, MassHighTech designated her a Woman to Watch and she received a Women Entrepreneurs in Science & Technology (WEST) Leadership Award. She also appeared on Mashable's 44 Female Founders Every Entrepreneur Should Know list in 2012.

Fitton is the co-Author of the book Twitter for Dummies.
