= Miguel Bezos =

American billionaire and philanthropist (born 1945)

- Born: Miguel Ángel Bezos Pérez; September 29, 1945 (age 81); Santiago de Cuba, Cuba
- Other name: Mike Bezos
- Employer: ExxonMobil
- Organization(s): Amazon.com, Bezos Family Foundation
- Spouse: Jacklyn Gise (m. 1968; died 2025)
- Children: 3, including Jeff and Mark

Miguel Ángel "Mike" Bezos Pérez (Spanish: [miˈɣel ˈβesos]; born September 29, 1945) is a Cuban-American billionaire and philanthropist who provided the initial investment to launch Amazon.com. He is a co-founder of the Bezos Family Foundation, which he currently serves as chair of the board of directors.

He is the adoptive father of Jeff Bezos, the father of Mark Bezos, and the widower of Jeff Bezos's mother, Jackie Bezos.

== Early life ==
Miguel Ángel Bezos was born in 1945 or 1946 in Santiago de Cuba, Cuba, and was raised with his brother and sister. His father, Salvador Bezos (Spanish: [salβaˈðoɾ ˈbeθos], was originally from Spain, owned a lumber mill and his mother was a part-time shopkeeper, selling fabric and infant clothing. His parents were initial supporters of Fidel Castro during the Cuban Revolution until Castro shifted his political stance towards Marxism–Leninism, seizing the family's lumber business. Bezos' family applied for Miguel to get a refugee visa from the United States. The application was successful and he departed Havana Airport for Miami on July 21, 1962, aged sixteen.

Upon arrival in the United States, Bezos was housed at Camp Matecumbe along with about 400 other Cuban refugee children. Three weeks later, Bezos and his cousin Ángel were relocated to attend a high school at Salesianum School in Wilmington, Delaware, and he lived in housing provided by a Catholic religious order, The Oblates of Saint Francis de Sales.

== Adult life ==
Bezos graduated from high school at the age of 17 and briefly relocated to Washington, D.C. He was awarded a funded scholarship at the University of Albuquerque in New Mexico, he initially majored in mechanical engineering, but he switched his major and graduated with a degree in computer science. While studying, he met Jackie Gise at night school, later marrying her. Gise was the mother of Jeff Bezos whom Miguel later adopted, with the approval of Ted Jorgensen, Jeff's biological father. Miguel Bezos graduated university in the fall of 1968, and took a job at Exxon, in Houston, Texas. In Houston, Jackie and Miguel had two more children, a daughter, Christina, and a son, Mark Bezos. Bezos remained working for Exxon for 32 years.

In 1995, Jacklyn and Miguel gave Jeff a loan of $245,573 (equivalent to $518,900 in 2025) to start Amazon.com, leaving them both with 6% equity. Bezos and his wife Jackie were co-founders of, and major donors to, the Bezos Family Foundation. Through the foundation, they donated $710.5 million to the Fred Hutchinson Cancer Center. They have relocated from Texas to Florida. For over 20 years, Miguel served as vice-president of the foundation, while Jackie served as president, with both then becoming the co-chairs of the foundation after John E. Deasy became its president in 2023. On August 14, 2025, Jackie, his wife of more than 57 years, died of Lewy body dementia. As of August 15, 2025, Bezos serves as the only chair of the foundation's board of directors.

== See also ==
- Family of Jeff Bezos
- Operation Peter Pan
