= Unicycle hockey =

Team sport version of hockey played on unicycles

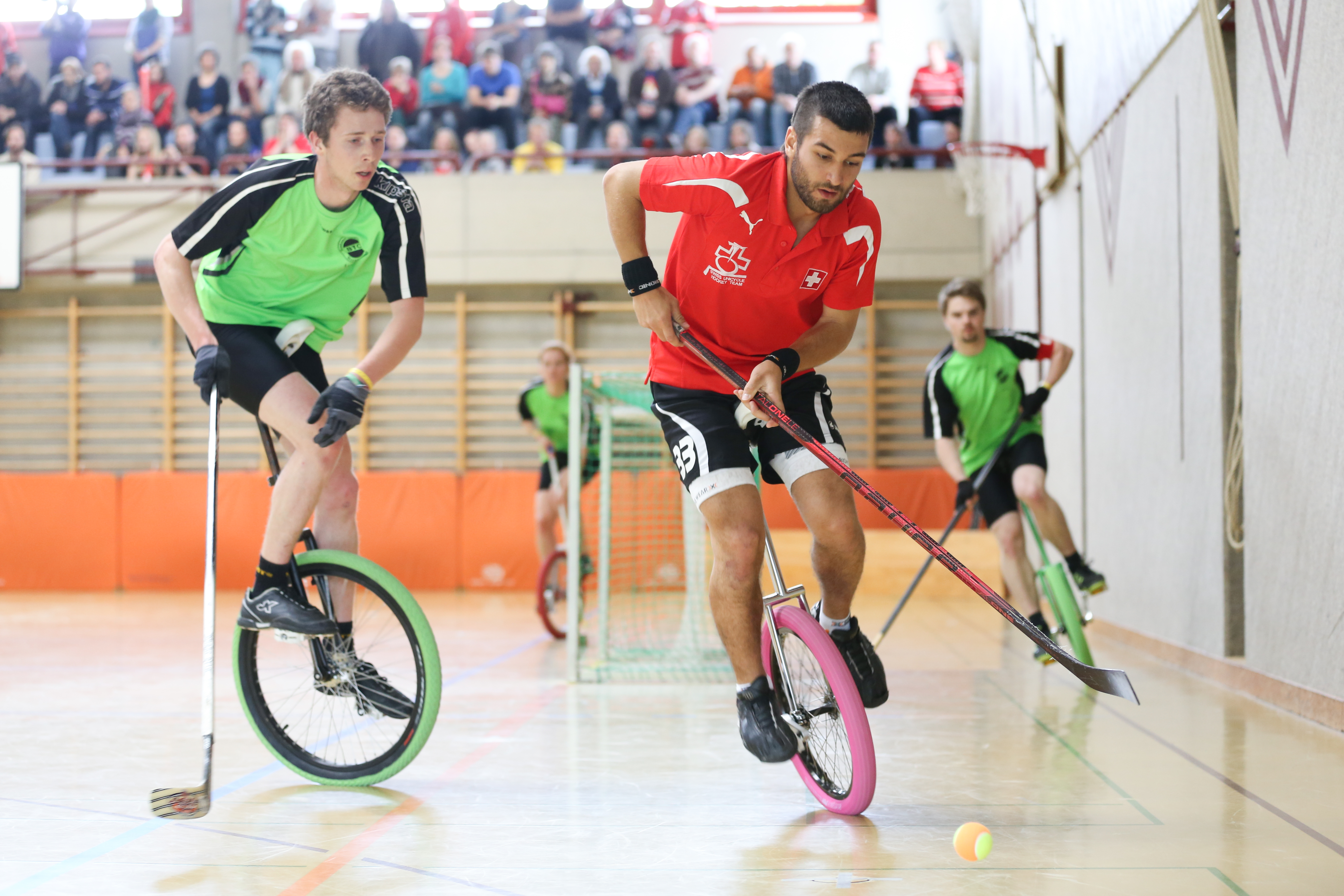
- Highest governing body: International Unicycling Federation
- First played: Unknown (first record: 1925 in the film Varieté)

Characteristics
- Contact: No (mild contact is tolerated)
- Team members: 5 players per side (plus substitutes)
- Mixed-sex: Allowed
- Equipment: Unicycle, Ice hockey stick and a ball

Presence
- Olympic: non-Olympic

Unicycle Hockey, 2012

Unicycle hockey is a team sport, similar to rink hockey where players try to hit the ball with their sticks into the other team's goal, except that each player must be mounted on a unicycle to play the ball. A team is composed of five players (plus substitutes), but there is no dedicated goalkeeper role (although one player usually stays back in that position).

The governing body for unicycle hockey is the International Unicycling Federation which publishes the rules for all unicycle sports. The most recent set of rules for unicycle hockey was published in 2019.

The court used is between 35 and 45 metres in length, and 20 to 25 metres wide. It should have either beveled or rounded corners, and barriers on all sides. The goals are also set back from the end walls so that players can go behind them, similarly to ice hockey.

Any stick which is legal for ice hockey, other than that of a goalkeeper, can be used. The unicycles can have a maximum wheel diameter of 24 inches (61 cm) and a tennis ball is used.

== Competition ==
There are three national unicycle hockey leagues: Australia, with 8 teams in 2016; Germany, with 89 teams; Switzerland, with approximately 20 teams

In addition to these leagues, there are clubs and teams in other countries, including United Kingdom, France, Denmark, Sweden, Hong Kong, Singapore, Taiwan and Korea.

International competition in the sport takes place at the biennial Unicon world championships and regional tournaments including Eurocycle and APUC.

== History ==
The first known instance of hockey on unicycles is a short segment in the 1925 film Variety, which shows two performers on a stage, one using a field hockey stick to push a ball around.

In 1960, unicycle hockey was mentioned as one of the activities of the Albuquerque Unicycle Club, founded in 1957, and then the only known unicycle club in both United States and the world. In 1971, the game was being played in Japan.

In 1976, a unicycle hockey club called 'Wheel People' was founded in California and ran for about ten years. In 1985, LaHiMo became the first German unicycle hockey club, based in Langenfeld. The first British Unicycle Hockey team of the modern era was formed by the apprentices of David Mariner, a manufacturer of DM Unicycles, by the company DM Engineering, in Wimborne, Dorset, U.K. The formation of LUNIS, a north London based team in 1987, meant that competitive Unicycle Hockey matches could be played in the U.K., with a national competition in 1988 at Covent Garden in London, won by LUNIS. In 1990, Jens Stemminger founded the Uniwheelers in Bremen. Radlos was the third German club, in Frankfurt from 1991, and others soon followed, leading to the foundation of the German league, still the world's largest.

In the early 1990s, the sport was introduced to Switzerland by Jojo Mühlmeyer, a Lahimo/Radlos pioneer.

The first European championship was held at the European Juggling Convention in Birmingham in the United Kingdom, in September 1993.

The following year, the first unicycle hockey world championships took place at Unicon VII in Minneapolis, in the United States, won by Germany. Every Unicon since has included a hockey championships. The current world champions, from Unicon XIX in Ansan, Korea, are Swiss Team.

== Notable players ==
- Ted Jorgensen
- Robert Williams (artist)
