= Globe Store =

Defunct store in the United States

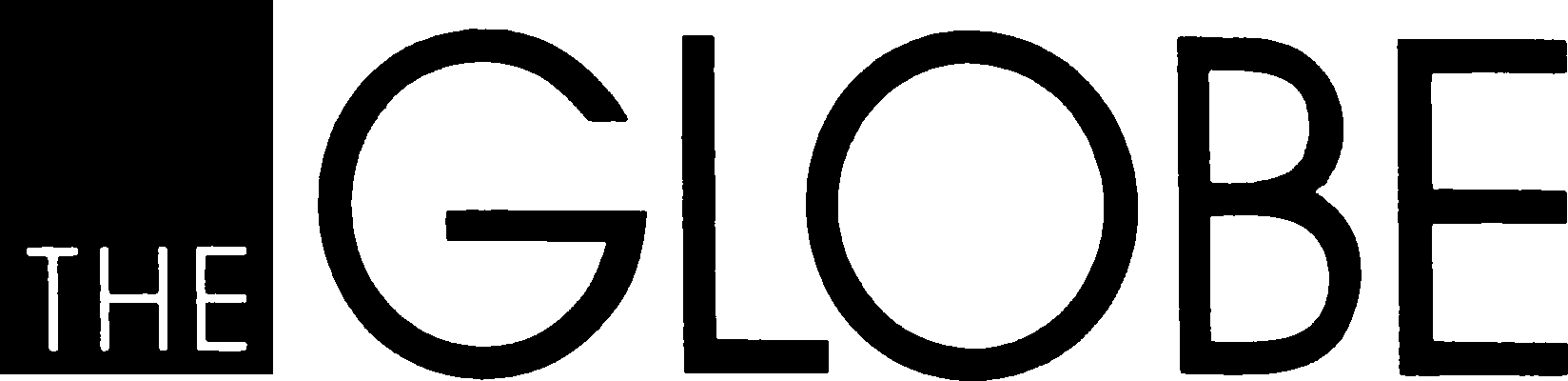

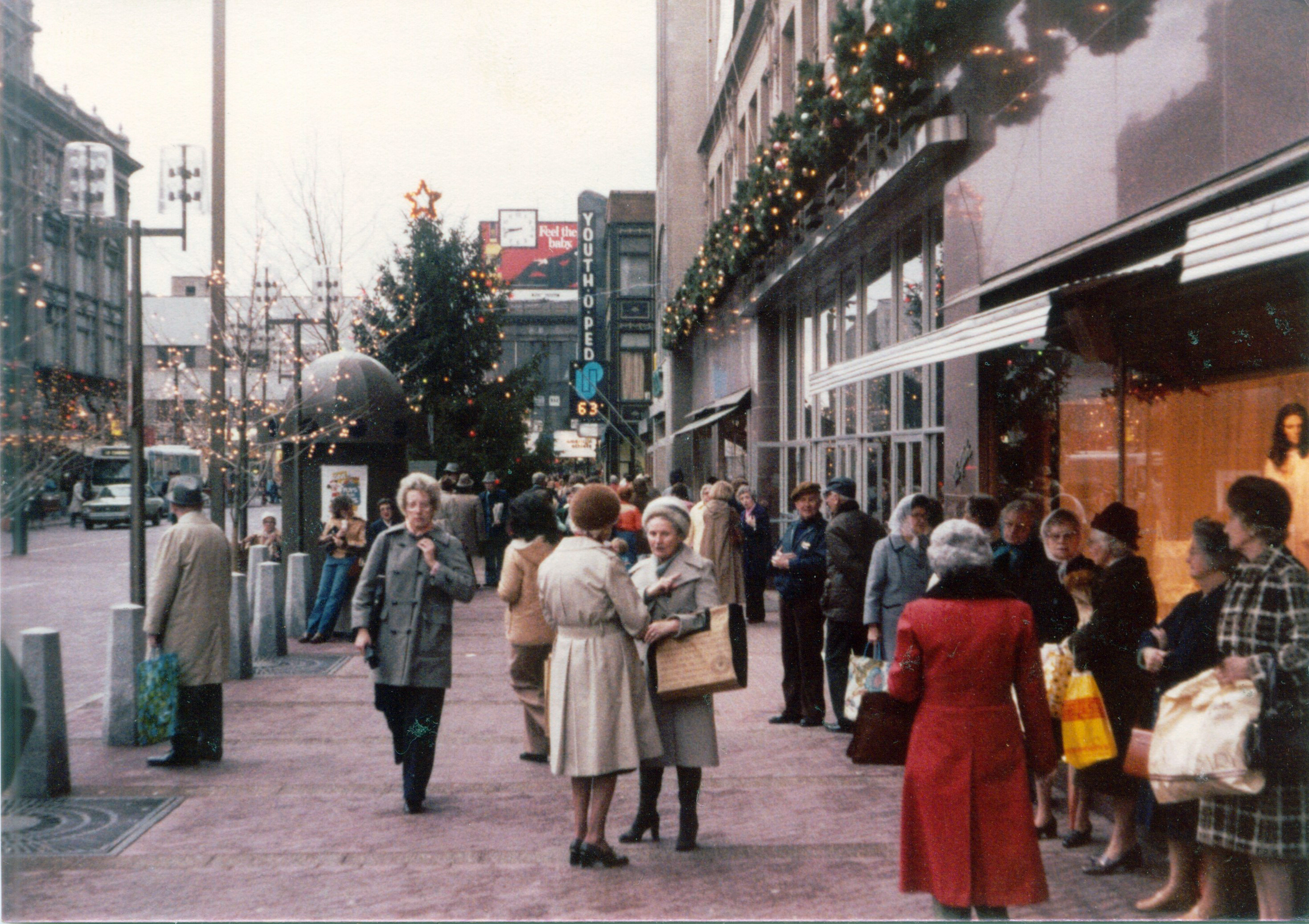
- Industry: Retail
- Founded: Danville, Pennsylvania, U.S.(1883)
- Founder: John Simpson and John Clelland
- Defunct: April 1994
- Headquarters: Scranton, Pennsylvania, U.S.
- Area served: Northeastern Pennsylvania

The Globe Store was a regional department store in Scranton, Pennsylvania, founded in 1883 by John Simpson and John Clelland. It closed in 1994.

== History ==
The original building was a three-story white stone-faced building. It was stocked with "the latest and largest line of dry goods, notions, cloaks, ladies' tailor-made suits, and men's furnishings".

The Globe Store eventually moved to Scranton where it would gain local fame. The Scranton Globe Store was the Cleland, Simpson & Taylor building on Wyoming Avenue. The original building of Cleland was destroyed by fire on March 17, 1889.

== Golden years ==
The new Globe Store in Scranton was one of the only stores of its kind in the city. It had sometimes been compared to the stores of New York City with its large display windows, enormous selection with all of the latest fashions, and its restaurant, the Charl-Mont (later converted to cafeteria style restaurant). The Globe continued to prosper throughout the 1900s, adding a wider selection of goods and other features to the store. It had elaborate outside decorations during the Christmas season.

== Economic downturn and closure ==
The founding families ran the store until 1979, a full decade after it became a division of John Wanamaker; the Globe continued to break sales records into the 1980s. In 1978, at the request of the Wanamaker family, Carter Hawley Hale (CHH) acquired John Wanamaker and its The Globe Store division. CHH invested heavily in Wanamaker's and The Globe intending to expand The Globes’ footprint. Carter Hawley Hale became embroiled in a fight to thwart 2 hostile takeover attempts by DeBartolo/Wexner and was forced to sell John Wanamaker and The Globe to Woodward & Lothrop. Woodies sold The Globe to local investors in 1989. Competition from suburban malls and retail consolidations had a detrimental impact. In 1993, Scranton's Steamtown Mall opened in an effort to draw dollars back downtown. The Globe was connected to the new mall via a pedestrian bridge, intended to lure shoppers across Lackawanna Avenue. Anchor stores in the new downtown mall changed, the Globe Store struggled and encountered innumerable financial and legal troubles. It filed for bankruptcy right after New Year's Day, 1994. Finally closing in April, after laying off 400 workers, when PNC Bank seized the store's assets. The former Globe building was converted to office space and is occupied by Diversified Information Technologies. The pedestrian bridge was closed off from the Globe and turned into the furniture department of Boscov's, one of the other anchors of the mall. That area become a Steve & Barry'ssportswear store until Steve & Barry's bankruptcy and subsequent liquidation. The area is now a Crunch Gym.

== Future ==
In 2016, the Lackawanna County commission announced that most of the county's offices would relocate to The Globe Store building following restoration and necessary renovations. As of 2019 the County Government has moved in and restoration work is ongoing.

== Store directory ==
First Floor Cosmetics, Fragrances, Sportswear, Florist, Candy Shop, Charlmont Restaurant
Second Floor Coats, Better Sportswear, Better Dresses, Shirts, Lingerie, Juniors, Junior Hair Salon
Third Floor House wear, China, Children’s Shoes and Clothes
Fourth Floor Furniture, Credit Department
Fifth Floor Executive Offices
