= ReadWrite =

Technology news website

- Website type: Technology blog
- Available in: English
- Website: readwrite.com
- Registration: None
- Launched: 2003; 23 years ago
- Current status: Active

ReadWrite (originally ReadWriteWeb or RWW) was a Web technology blog launched in 2003, covering Web 2.0 and Web technology in general, and providing industry news, reviews, and analysis. It was founded by Richard MacManus. Around September or October 2008, The New York Times technology section began syndicating RW content online. RW also had many international channels such as France, Spain, Brazil and China.

The website rebranded as a casino expert advice "blog." in 2017 before Brad Anderson, the current editor-in-chief, changed the site into a cryptocurrency, artificial intelligence, and technology based website.

RW was acquired by SAY Media in 2011. On October 22, 2012, RWW redesigned its website, rebranded as ReadWrite and hired Daniel Lyons as the new editor-in-chief. Dan Lyons left ReadWrite on March 20, 2013, replaced by Owen Thomas.

SAY Media sold ReadWrite to Wearable World in February 2015. In June 2015, the company announced a crowd funding campaign.

== Editors-in-Chief ==
Editor-in-Chief	Editor from	Editor to
Richard MacManus	2003	2012
Daniel Lyons	2012	2013
Owen Thomas	2013	2016
Trevor Curwin	2016	2017
Clayton Jacobs	2017	2018
Brad Anderson	2018	-

== See also ==
- Ars Technica
- Techdirt
- Mashable
- TechCrunch
