= Jackie Bezos =

Mother of Jeff Bezos (1946–2025)

- Bezos c. 2015
- Born: Jacklyn Gise; December 29, 1946; Washington, D.C., U.S.
- Died: August 14, 2025 (aged 78); Miami, Florida, U.S.
- Other name: Jacklyn Jorgensen
- Organizations: Amazon.com; Bezos Family Foundation
- Spouses: Ted Jorgensen (m. 1963; div. 1965) Miguel Bezos (m. 1968)
- Children: 3, including Jeff and Mark
- Relatives: George Strait (second cousin)

Jacklyn Bezos (née Gise, formerly Jorgensen; December 29, 1946 – August 14, 2025) was an American businesswoman. She was the mother of Jeff and Mark Bezos. She provided the initial investment to launch Amazon.com and was a philanthropist as co-founder and president of the Bezos Family Foundation.

== Early life ==
Jacklyn Bezos was born as Jacklyn Gise in Washington, D.C., on December 29, 1946, to Lawrence Preston Gise, who worked at Sandia National Laboratories, and Mattie Louise Strait Gise. She grew up in Bernalillo, New Mexico, and attended high school in Albuquerque. Country singer George Strait is a second cousin of hers.

In high school, Jacklyn dated unicyclist Ted Jorgensen. She became pregnant in 1963 when Jorgensen was 18 and she was 16, shortly before they got married in Ciudad Juárez, Mexico. They had a second ceremony in the United States on July 19 the same year. Jacklyn gave birth to Jeff Bezos on January 12, 1964, two weeks after her 17th birthday. They named the child Jeffrey Preston Jorgensen at birth. Her high school sought to block her from graduating, but later relented, after banning her from socializing with other students.

Jacklyn's father paid for Jorgensen's school fees, as Jorgensen struggled financially and drank alcohol to excess. Jacklyn left Jorgensen to live with her parents, filing for divorce in June 1965 when Jeff was seventeen months old.

== Adult life ==
After graduating from high school, Jacklyn worked as a secretary, earning $190 a month, and left her parents' home to rent an apartment, living with Jeff. She worked days and attended night school, taking Jeff to the classes.

Jacklyn met Cuban refugee Miguel Bezos at night school, later marrying him. Miguel Bezos, with Jorgensen's support, adopted Jeff. Jacklyn and Miguel Bezos relocated, bringing Jeff with them. They asked Jorgensen to discontinue contact, to which he agreed, relinquishing custody. The three moved to Houston, Texas. Bezos gave birth to daughter Christina and then son Mark.

Twenty years after starting, Jacklyn graduated from Saint Elizabeth University at the age of 40.

In 1995, Jacklyn and Miguel loaned Jeff $245,573 (equivalent to $518,900 in 2025) to start Amazon.com, giving them both 6% equity. Later they relocated to Florida.

Bezos was, along with her husband, a co-founder of, and a major donor to, the Bezos Family Foundation. Through the foundation, they donated $710.5 million to the Fred Hutchinson Cancer Center. For more than 20 years, Jacklyn Bezos served as president of the foundation, before this position was handed over to John E. Deasy in 2023.

== Later life and death ==
In 2020, Bezos was diagnosed with Lewy body dementia, a progressive neurological disorder. She continued to be involved with philanthropic work through the Bezos Family Foundation, focusing on early learning programs such as Vroom and the Bezos Scholars Program, as well as funding medical research and community healthcare initiatives, including large-scale donations to the Fred Hutchinson Cancer Center in Seattle to advance immunotherapy treatments.

Bezos died at her home in Miami on August 14, 2025, at the age of 78.

== See also ==
- Jacklyn (ship), a Blue Origin ship named after Jacklyn Bezos, a landing platform vessel for rockets
- Jacklyn (barge), a Blue Origin barge named after Jacklyn Bezos, a landing platform vessel for rockets
- Family of Jeff Bezos
