= Startup (disambiguation) =

Startup commonly refers to:

- Startup company, a newly emerged, fast-growing business

Startup or start-up may also refer to:

- Booting, an initialization period that computers and electronics go through when first turned on
- Project commissioning, the act of starting for the first time a technical installation
- Sign-on, when broadcasters start transmissions on a day

== Geography ==
- Startup, Washington, a census-designated place in Snohomish County, Washington

== Film and TV ==
- Start-Ups: Silicon Valley, a reality television series about startup companies that premiered in 2012
- Startup.com, a 2001 documentary film about the dot-com start-up phenomenon
- Start Up (2013 TV series), a 2013 American docuseries that aired on public television
- Antitrust (film), a 2001 American film also known as "Startup"
- StartUp (TV series), an American television drama series from 2016 with Martin Freeman and Ron Perlman that was released on Crackle
- StartUp (podcast), an American podcast from Gimlet Media hosted by Alex Blumberg and Lisa Chow
- Start-Up (film), a 2019 South Korean film written and directed by Choi Jung-yeol
- Startup, a 2014 Russian film about the rise of Yandex
- Start-Up (South Korean TV series), a 2020 South Korean television drama series
- Start-Up PH, a Philippine television drama series based on the South Korean drama of the same name

== Other ==
- Start-Up (video game), a 2000 video game
- Startups.co.uk, a British website
- "Startup!", a 2014 song by South Korean boy band Boyfriend
- "Start Up", a song by Ikara Colt
- "Start Up", a song by Steve Swell
- "Start Up", a song by Scott 4 (band)
