= Disrupted: My Misadventure in the Start Up Bubble =

Book by American journalist Daniel Lyons

- Author: Daniel Lyons
- Subject: HubSpot
- Publisher: Hachette Book Group
- Publication date: 2016
- Pages: 272
- ISBN: 9780316306072

Disrupted: My Misadventure in the Start-Up Bubble is a book written by American author and journalist Daniel Lyons. The book describes the author's experiences working at the software company HubSpot and offers a sharp critique of the company's management and culture.

Shortly after the book was published, Lyons wrote in The New York Times that HubSpot had a "frat house" atmosphere. He also called the company a "digital sweatshop" in which workers had little job security. Later that month, HubSpot's founders gave an official response to the book, in which they addressed several, but not all, of Lyons' claims.

Disrupted was first published on April 5, 2016, by the Hachette Book Group.

== Attempted suppression ==
FBI documents accessed by journalists via a freedom of information request revealed that HubSpot attempted "multiple failed attempts to manipulate and extort people” with the intention of stopping the book's publication. Trade journalist and marketing speaker Samuel Scott has a PDF version of the full, redacted FBI report available for download on his website.

HubSpot executives considered the book "a financial threat to HubSpot, its share price, and the company’s future potential".

== Reception ==
The book was favorably received with the Los Angeles Times saying that it was "the best book on the Silicon Valley". Ashlee Vance, American journalist and author, said that the book was "wildly entertaining" and that it "injected a dose of sanity into a world gone mad".
