= Daniel Lyons =

American writer

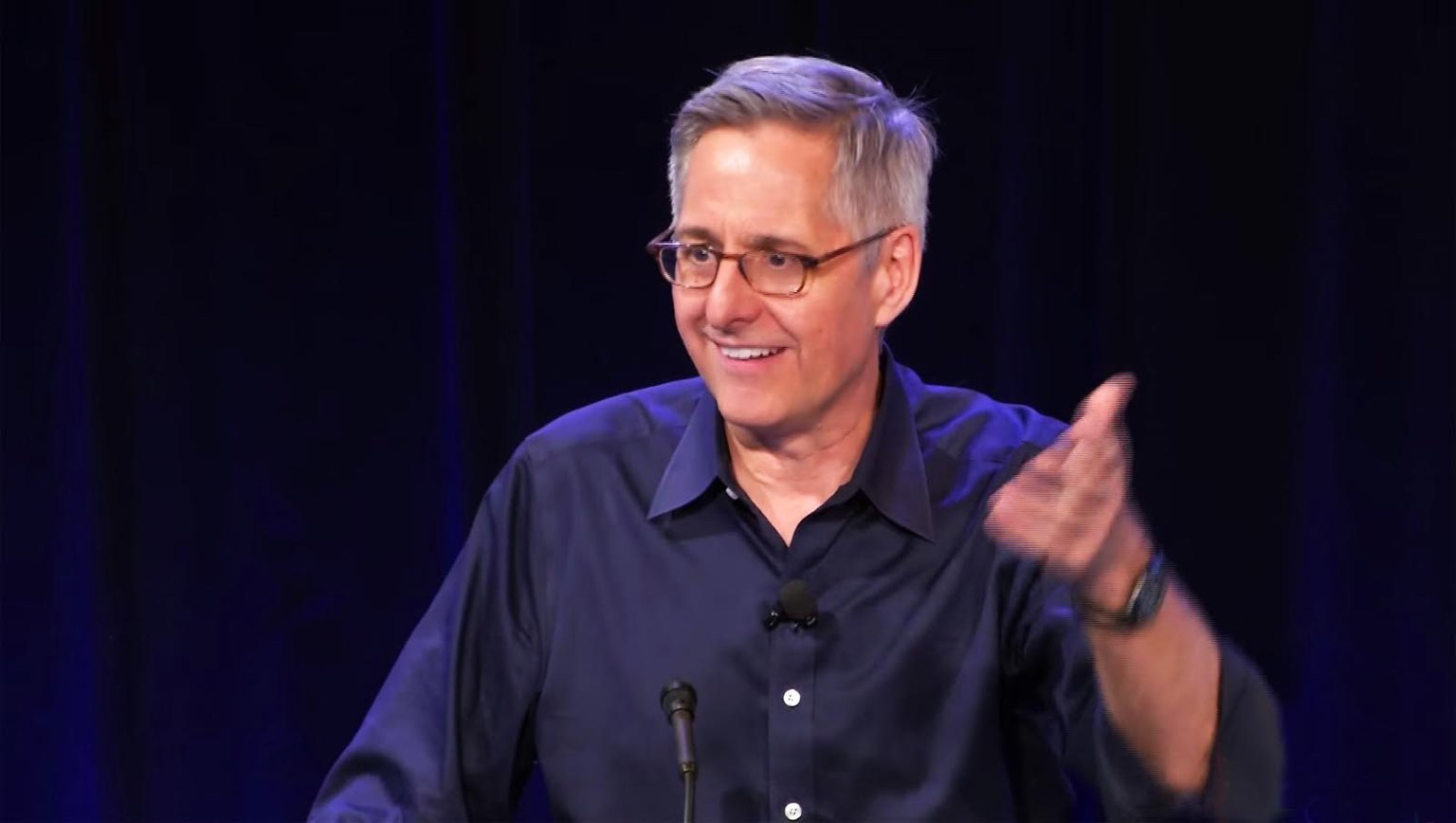
- American author Daniel Lyons
- Born: 1960 (age 65–66); Massachusetts
- Education: University of Michigan (MFA)
- Occupation: Columnist
- Spouse: Alexandra Lyons
- Children: Twins
- Website: https://www.danlyons.io/

Daniel Lyons (born 1960) is an American writer. He was a senior editor at Forbes magazine and a writer at Newsweek before becoming editor of ReadWrite. In March 2013 he left ReadWrite to accept a position at HubSpot.

Lyons began his career with a book of short stories, The Last Good Man (1993), a novel, Dog Days (1998), and a fictional biography, Options: The Secret Life of Steve Jobs (2007). Lyons then began writing non-fiction books: Disrupted: My Misadventure in the Start-Up Bubble (2016), Lab Rats: How Silicon Valley Made Work Miserable for the Rest of Us (2018) and STFU: The Power of Keeping Your Mouth Shut in an Endlessly Noisy World (2023).

Under the pseudonym "Fake Steve Jobs", he also wrote The Secret Diary of Steve Jobs, a popular blog and parody of Apple CEO Steve Jobs. He was a writer and coproducer on HBO's Silicon Valley and wrote the script for the May 2015 episode "White Hat/Black Hat" while on a 14-week break from HubSpot in 2014.

Dan Lyons authored the book Disrupted: My Misadventure in the Start Up Bubble (2016) about his time at the Boston, Massachusetts, startup HubSpot. The book was a New York Times, Wall Street Journal and San Francisco Chronicle bestseller. Readers responded to the book with numerous letters which inspired his next book: Lab Rats (2018). He has won other literary awards including the 1992 AWP Award for Short Fiction (for his story "The First Snow") and the Playboy College Fiction Award (for "The Greyhound").

== Early life and education ==
Lyons was born in Massachusetts. He attended Brooks School in North Andover, Massachusetts, a college preparatory school. He received his MFA from the University of Michigan in 1992.

== Career and blogging ==
=== Work as technology analyst ===
Lyons was a senior editor at Forbes magazine, covering enterprise computing and consumer electronics. He was also the author of the Forbes cover article, "Attack of the Blogs", where he wrote that blogs "are the prized platform of an online lynch mob spouting liberty but spewing lies, libel and invective," claiming that Groklaw was primarily created "to bash software maker SCO Group in its Linux patent lawsuit against IBM, producing laughably biased, pro-IBM coverage."

Between 2003 and 2007 Lyons covered the SCO cases against IBM and against Linux. He published articles such as "What SCO Wants, SCO Gets," where he stated that "like many religious folk, the Linux-loving crunchies in the open-source movement are a) convinced of their own righteousness, and b) sure the whole world, including judges, will agree. They should wake up."

In 2007 Lyons admitted to being "Snowed By SCO": "For four years, I've been covering a lawsuit for Forbes.com, and my early predictions on this case have turned out to be so profoundly wrong that I am writing this mea culpa ... In March 2003, SCO sued IBM claiming that IBM took code from Unix—for which SCO claimed to own copyrights—and put that code into Linux, which is distributed free. Last month a judge ruled that SCO does not, in fact, own the Unix copyrights. That blows SCO's case against IBM out of the water. SCO, of Lindon, Utah, is seeking bankruptcy protection."

=== Fake Steve Jobs ===
Lyons began blogging as "Fake Steve Jobs" in 2006. He was able to maintain anonymity for just under one year, despite speculation. Before the identity of Fake Steve Jobs was revealed by The New York Times' technology correspondent Brad Stone on August 5, 2007, The Secret Diary of Steve Jobs was referenced by numerous online and print media such as Engadget, BusinessWeek, Forbes, Der Spiegel, El Mundo and CNET. Fake Steve Jobs ranked 37th in a Business 2.0 article entitled "50 Who Matter Now."

Previous guesses as to the blog's author included Leander Kahney of Wired (particularly at some of Fake Steve Jobs's Briticisms), Eric Savitz of Barron's Magazine, John Paczkowski of All Things Digital, and Andy Ihnatko of the Chicago Sun-Times. Another suggestion was that Jack Miller, the webmaster/blogger of the "As the Apple Turns" website, which was seemingly abandoned in 2006, but which is still live, could possibly be Fake Steve Jobs.

At The Wall Street Journal's "D: All Things Digital" technology conference, the real Steve Jobs was quoted as saying, "I have read a few of the Fake Steve Jobs things recently and I think they’re pretty funny." During a later joint interview, Bill Gates quipped that he was not Fake Steve Jobs.

In October 2007 Lyons released the book Options: The Secret Life of Steve Jobs, a Parody, under the pseudonym "Fake Steve Jobs". Although based largely upon previous material published on The Secret Diary of Steve Jobs blog, the book creates a more cohesive narrative focusing especially on the stock options backdating scandal looming over Steve Jobs in late 2006 and early 2007.

On July 9, 2008, Lyons announced on the Fake Steve blog that he would be launching a new site under his own name and discontinuing writing in a faux-Jobs style. He later announced his decision to place the Fake Steve blog on indefinite hiatus was out of respect for the real Steve Jobs' health:

"I began hearing a few months ago that Steve Jobs was very sick. I wasn't sure if these rumors were true or not. Then I saw how he looked at [the Worldwide Developers Conference in early June, 2008] and it was like having the wind knocked out of me. I just couldn't carry on."

The blog was continued in 2009 after news broke that Jobs had recovered from a liver transplant, but then suspended again in January 2011 when Jobs took a second leave of absence for health reasons. After Jobs' death in October 2011, Fake Steve Jobs posted a farewell poem, and has not been active since.
