= David Meerman Scott =

American online marketing strategist and author

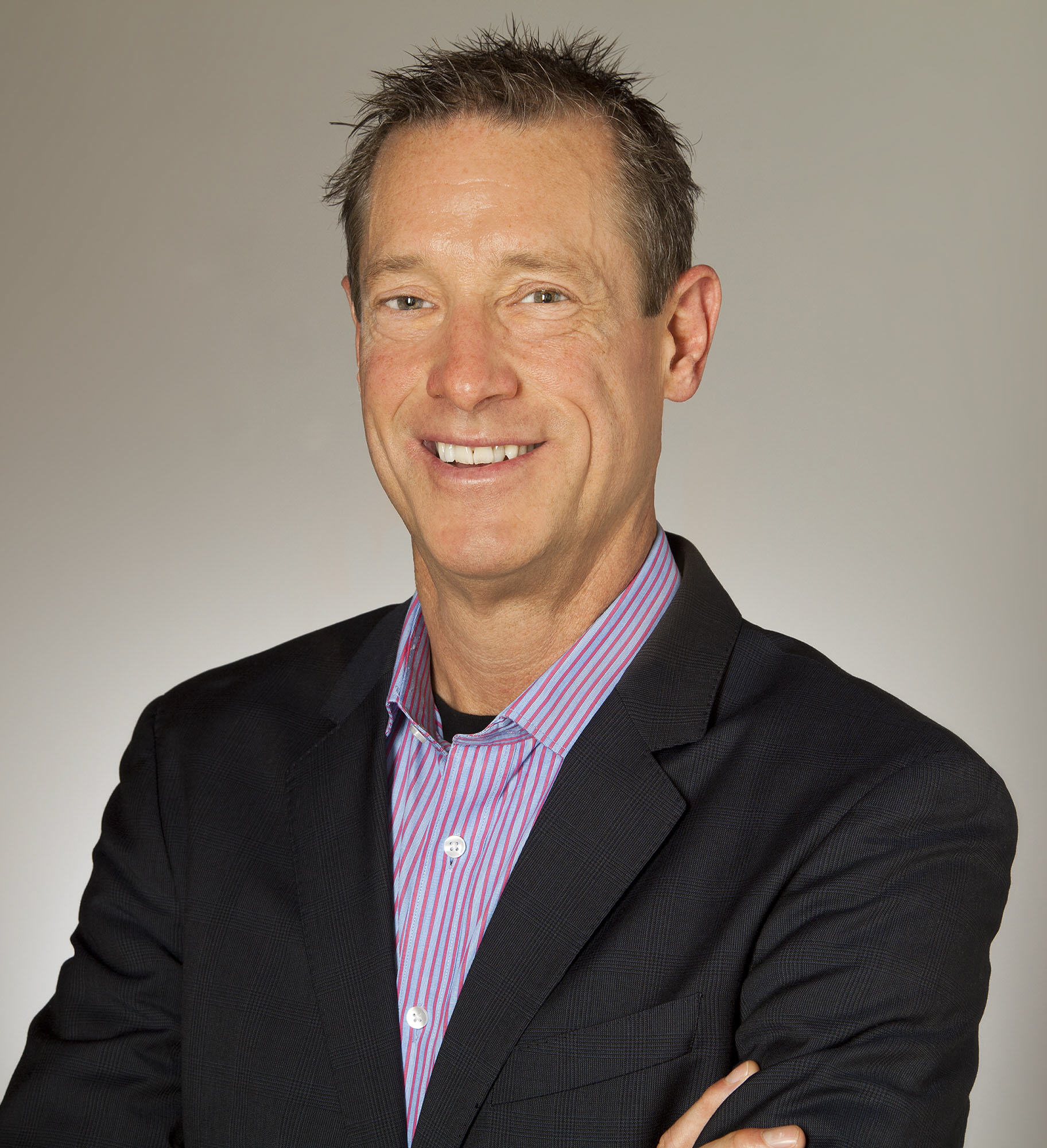
- David Meerman Scott photographed in Boston, Massachusetts on August 11, 2014 by Bruce Rogovin
- Born: 1961 (age 64–65)
- Education: Kenyon College
- Occupations: Marketing strategist, Speaker, Author
- Spouse: Yukari Watanabe Scott
- Children: 1
- Website: Official website

David Meerman Scott is an American online marketing strategist and author of books such as The New Rules of Marketing & PR.

== Early life ==
David Meerman Scott graduated from Kenyon College in 1983 with a Bachelor of Arts in economics. He then worked as a clerk on several Wall Street bond trading desks. From 1985, he worked in online news and information, holding executive positions at Knight-Ridder from 1989. Scott moved to the Boston area in 1995 and joined Desktop Data, which became NewsEdge Corporation, ultimately holding the position of vice president of marketing. The business was sold in 2002 to Thomson Corporation who terminated his employment, so he started his own business as a marketing strategist.

== Marketing career ==
Scott says the rules of marketing and public relations are completely different on the Web to those in mainstream media. The old rules of mainstream media were about getting a message into the public domain by buying advertising or begging the media to write about you. Scott says anybody can instead earn attention by "publishing their way in" using the tools of social media such as blogs, podcasts, video, online news releases and viral marketing. He believes that, with few exceptions, marketers gain the best return on their investment in content creation when they choose "ungated" publication.

Writing for Forbes, Nick Morgan notes that "David is one of those select few people who saw and understood the social media phenomenon as it began..."

In 2017, the word "newsjacking" was shortlisted by the Oxford English Dictionary as a potential Word of the Year and defined as, "The practice of taking advantage of current events or news stories in such a way as to promote or advertise one's product or brand". Scott was credited for popularizing the new meaning of the term.

== Personal life ==
Scott is married to Yukari Watanabe Scott. They have one daughter, Reiko Scott, with whom Scott co-authored Fanocracy.

== Bibliography ==
- The Fandom Playbook: How to Create Passionate Fans in a World of Online Chaos (2026).
- The New Rules of Marketing & PR: How to Use Content Marketing, AI, Social Media, Podcasting, Video, and Newsjacking to Reach Buyers Directly (9th edition, 2024)
- Fanocracy: Turning Fans into Customers and Customers into Fans (2020), co-author
- The New Rules of Sales and Service: How to Use Agile Selling, Real-Time Customer Engagement, Big Data, Content, and Storytelling to Grow Your Business (2016)
- Marketing the Moon: The Selling of the Apollo Lunar Program (2014), co-author
- Newsjacking: How to Inject your Ideas into a Breaking News Story and Generate Tons of Media Coverage (2011)
- Real-Time Marketing and PR: How to Instantly Engage Your Market, Connect with Customers, and Create Products that Grow Your Business Now (2010)
- Marketing Lessons from the Grateful Dead: What Every Business Can Learn from the Most Iconic Band in History (2010), co-author
- World Wide Rave: Creating Triggers that Get Millions of People to Spread Your Ideas and Share Your Stories (2009).
- Tuned In: Uncover the Extraordinary Opportunities That Lead to Business Breakthrough (2008), co-author
- Cashing In With Content: How Innovative Marketers Use Digital Information to Turn Browsers into Buyers (2005)
- Eyeball Wars: A Novel of Dot-com Intrigue (2001)
