= Acharya Pre University College =

Private co-educational pre-university college in Bengaluru, India

Acharya Pre University College, or APUC, is a private co-educational pre-university college in Bengaluru, India. Established in 2005, it offers 4 pre-university courses.

== History ==
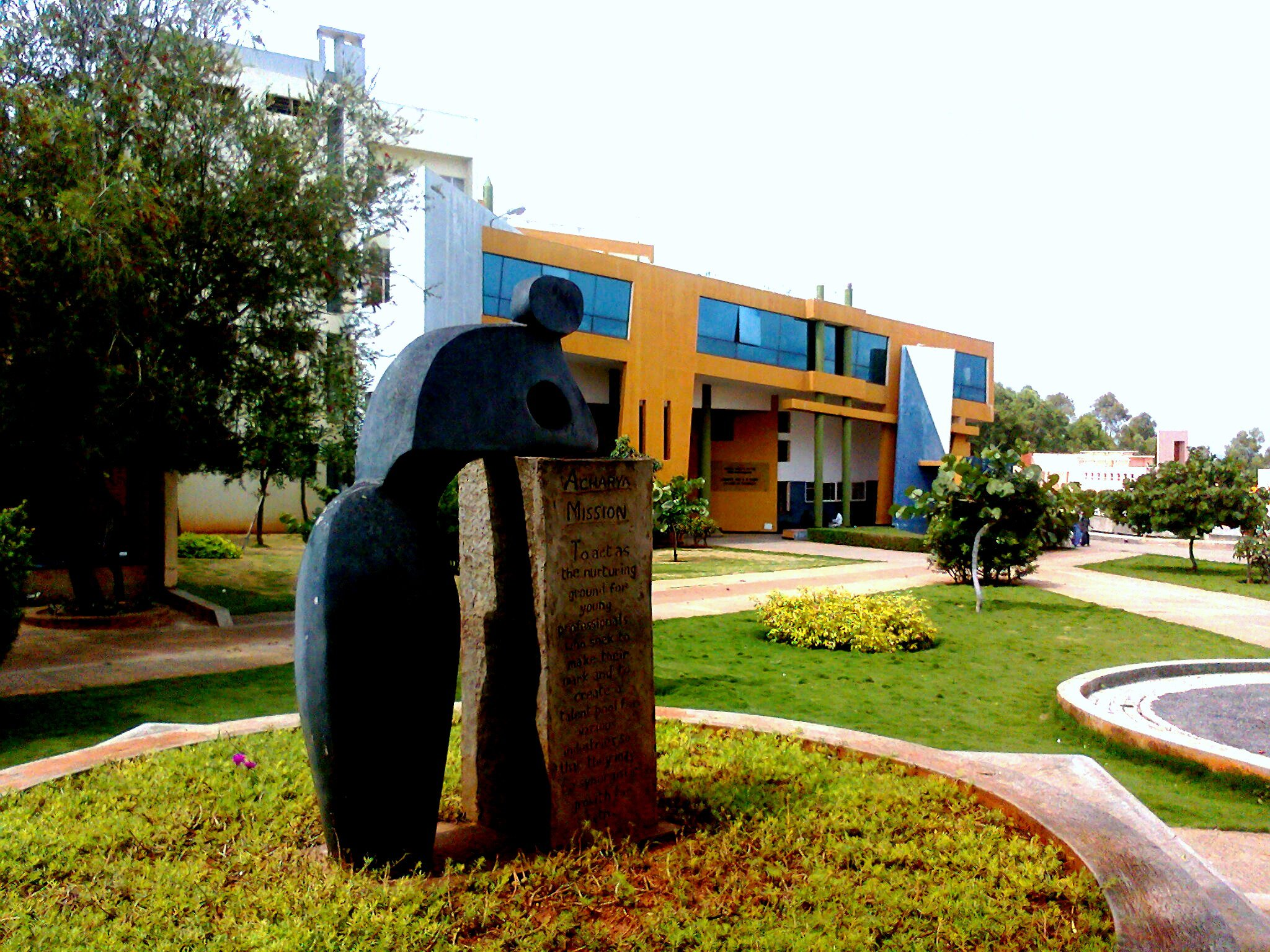
The Acharya emblem with motto and mission

The Acharya Pre University College (APUC) was established in 2005 by Premnath Reddy, Chairman of the Acharya Group of Institutions. The college is managed by the JMJ Education Society, Headquartered in Bengaluru. APUC offers Four courses. All courses are affiliated to the Department of Pre University Education (PU Board).

In 2009, the college constructed a 3-kilometre (1.9 mi) long road from its campus to the Hesaraghatta Main Road. The road was inaugurated by Shivakumara Swamiji of Siddaganga Math in September 2010. It is named Acharya Sarvepalli Radhakrishnan Road after former Indian President Sarvepalli Radhakrishnan.

On 16 June 2012, the college hosted India's first heavy metal music festival as a part of Bengaluru Open Air 2012 backed by Germany's Wacken Open Air at the college stadium. German heavy metal bands and Teutonic thrash metal bands like the Kreator and the Suidakra along with an American Power metal band and Indian metal bands namely Kryptos, Eccentric Pendulum, Dying Embrace, 1833 AD, Bevar Sea and Albatross performed in the fest. Iced Earth was scheduled to perform at the fest, but backed out due to the denial of a visa by the Indian embassy.
