= The Upstarts =

2017 book by Brad Stone

- First edition
- Author: Brad Stone
- Language: English
- Genre: Non-fiction
- Publisher: Little, Brown
- Publication date: 2017
- Publication place: United States

The Upstarts: How Uber, Airbnb, and the Killer Companies of the New Silicon Valley Are Changing the World is a 2017 book by journalist Brad Stone. It chronicles the founding of companies such as Uber and Airbnb, and investigates the evolution of the Silicon Valley.
