= Mountain unicycling =

Adventure sport

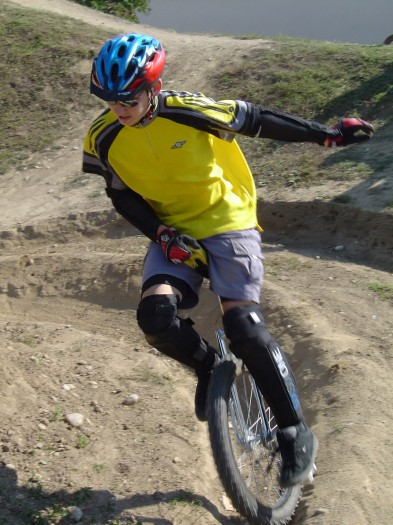
Mountain unicycling

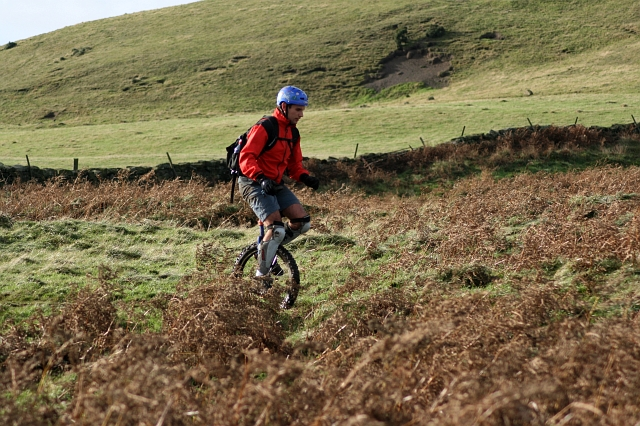
Mountain unicyclist in England (Roseberry Topping)

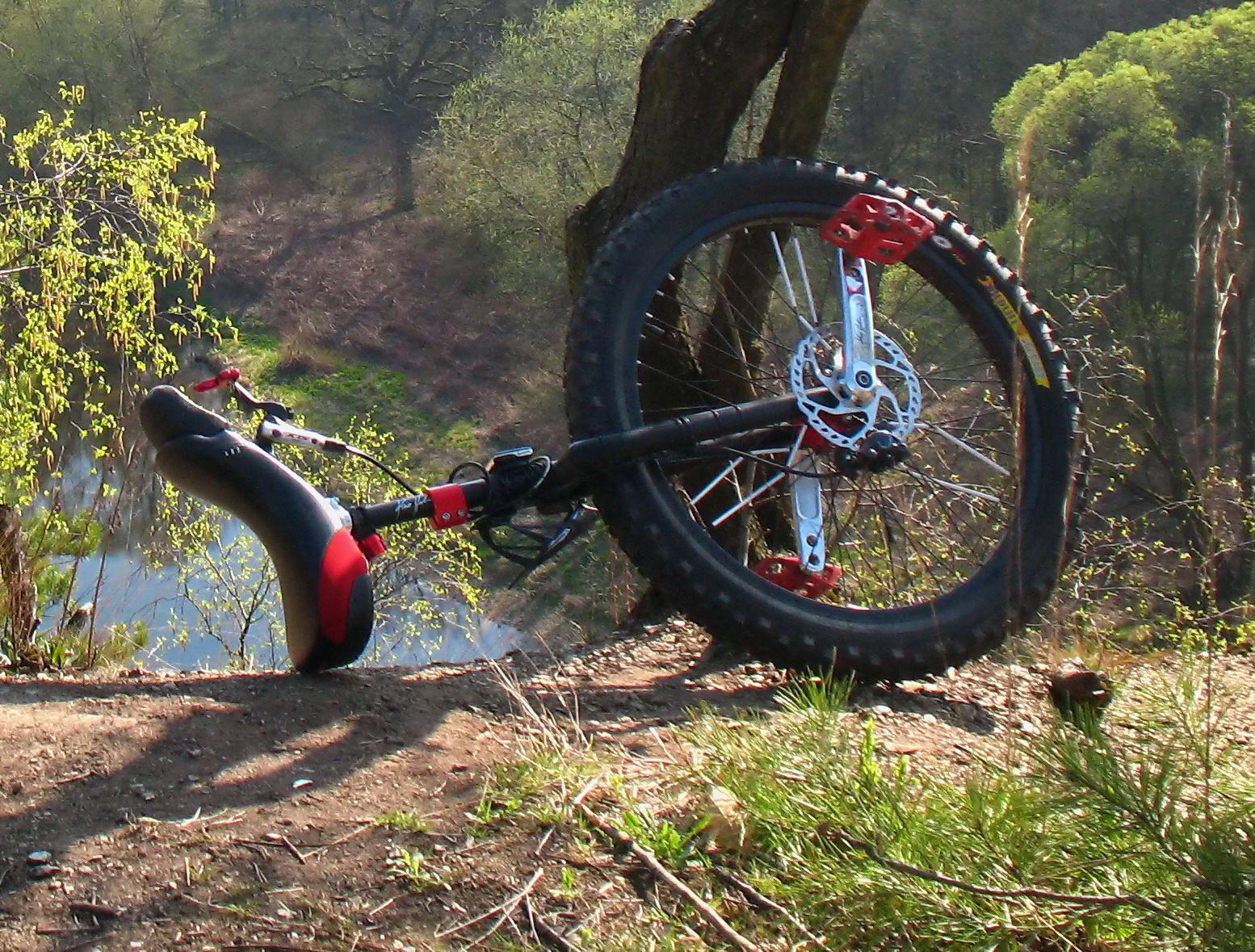
Mountain unicycle with disc brakes (Qu-ax/Kris Holm)

Mountain unicycling

Mountain unicycling is an adventure sport that consists of traversing rough terrain on a unicycle. Mountain unicycling (muni or municycling) is undertaken on similar terrain to mountain biking. However, mountain unicycling requires much more attention to the microfeatures of the short distance in front of the wheel. Unicycles' lack of a freewheel means that descents must be controlled all the way, and the typical lack of a gear system (though two-gear hubs are available) prevents the rider from reaching high speeds. Mountain unicycling usually takes place on specially designed unicycles, which are equipped with strong hubs, large, knobbly tires, high-grip pedals and rugged frames. Some are also equipped with rim or disc brakes, having the lever mounted under the nose of the saddle. The brake primarily helps to compensate the downhill-slope force, while more expert riders also use it to decelerate or stop.

Mountain unicycle riders also need a few additional skills than required for either mountain biking or regular unicycling, with core strength, endurance and balance being key.

== Skills ==
The ability to stall (rock the cranks back and forth while remaining in the same location) and bunny hop (hop up and down while remaining in the same location) are helpful.

== Equipment ==
The unicycle typically has broad tires with grippy profile, filled with medium air pressure. The grippy pedals may have a tilt front contour (viewed from the side). The cranks should not be too long – relative to the rim size – to maintain clearance from bigger stones on the ground. Rims are rather broad to be sturdy and may have bores between the spoke holes to save weight, as a typical trial bike wheel. The banana saddle is fixed (not spring suspended) on the fork and carries a front and back bumper made of stiff plastics. The front bumper is used by three fingers from underneath as a handle, when the rider jumps or dismounts – or falls.

The rider wears shoes with grip and uses a helmet and protectors at shins, knees and at least gloves on the hands.

A helmet camera needs a wide angle lens and picture stabilization, because the rider makes sudden and quick head movements to watch the trail.

== Events ==
- Mountain unicycle events recognized by the International Unicycling Federation at Unicons are: cross-country, uphill and downhill with the possibility of North Shore downhill.
- In the United States, the California Mountain Unicycle Weekend and the Moab, Utah Muni Fest (ended as of 2009).
- In the UK, the British Muni Weekend (BMW).
- The first Colorado Munifest took place in October 2007, organized by Colorado Muni.
- The first Arizona Mountain Unicycle Weekend was held in February 2009, organized by the Arizona Unicycle Club.
- In Australia, Cross County and Downhill are included in UniNats, held by the Australian Unicycle Society every 12–18 months.
- In Liechtenstein and Switzerland, the Elsbet (abbreviation for Einzigartiges Liechtensteiner und Schweizer Berg-Einrad Treffen, English: Unique Mountain Unicycling Meeting of Liechtenstein and Switzerland)

== Gallery ==
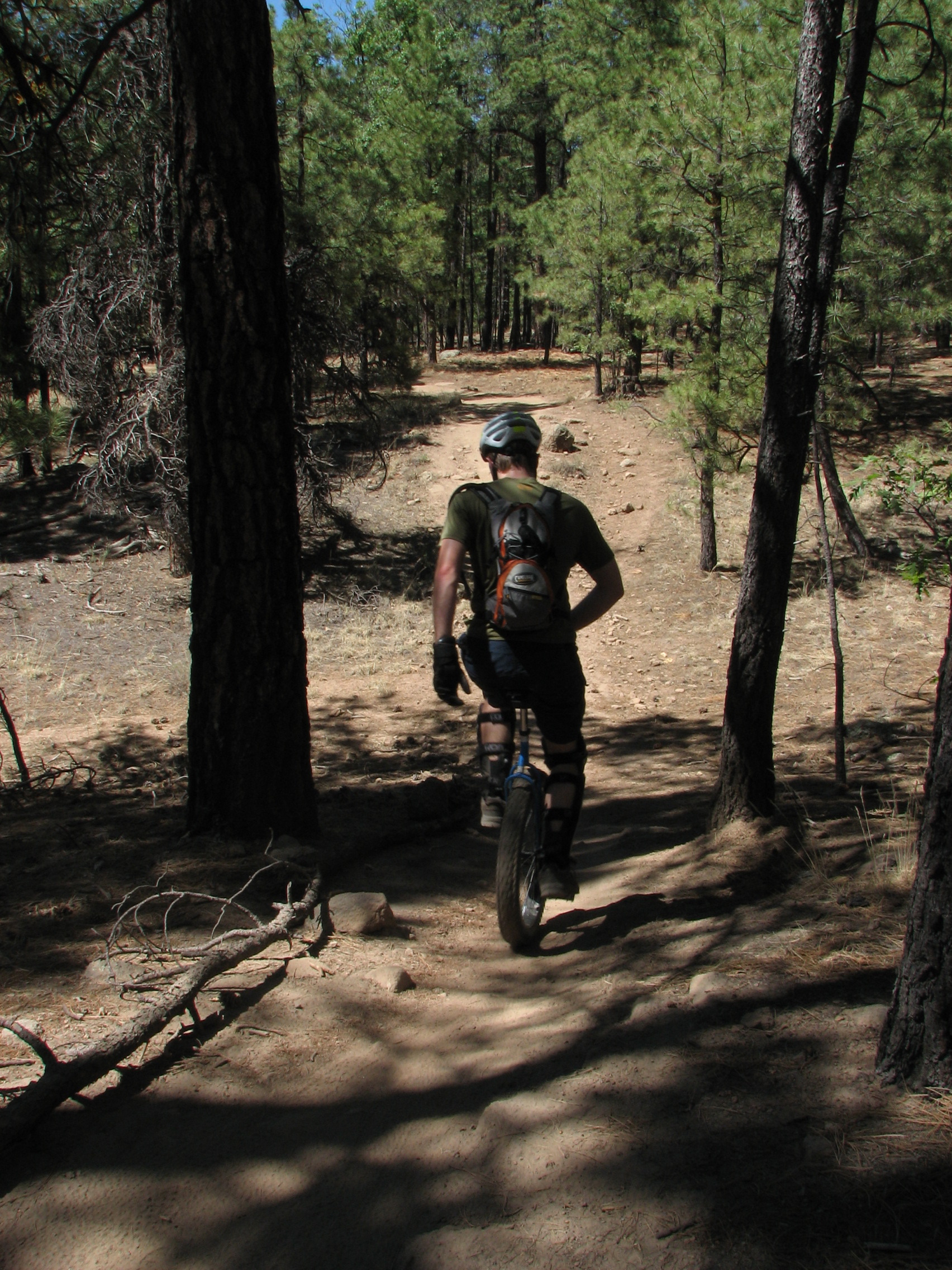
Relaxed mountain unicycling

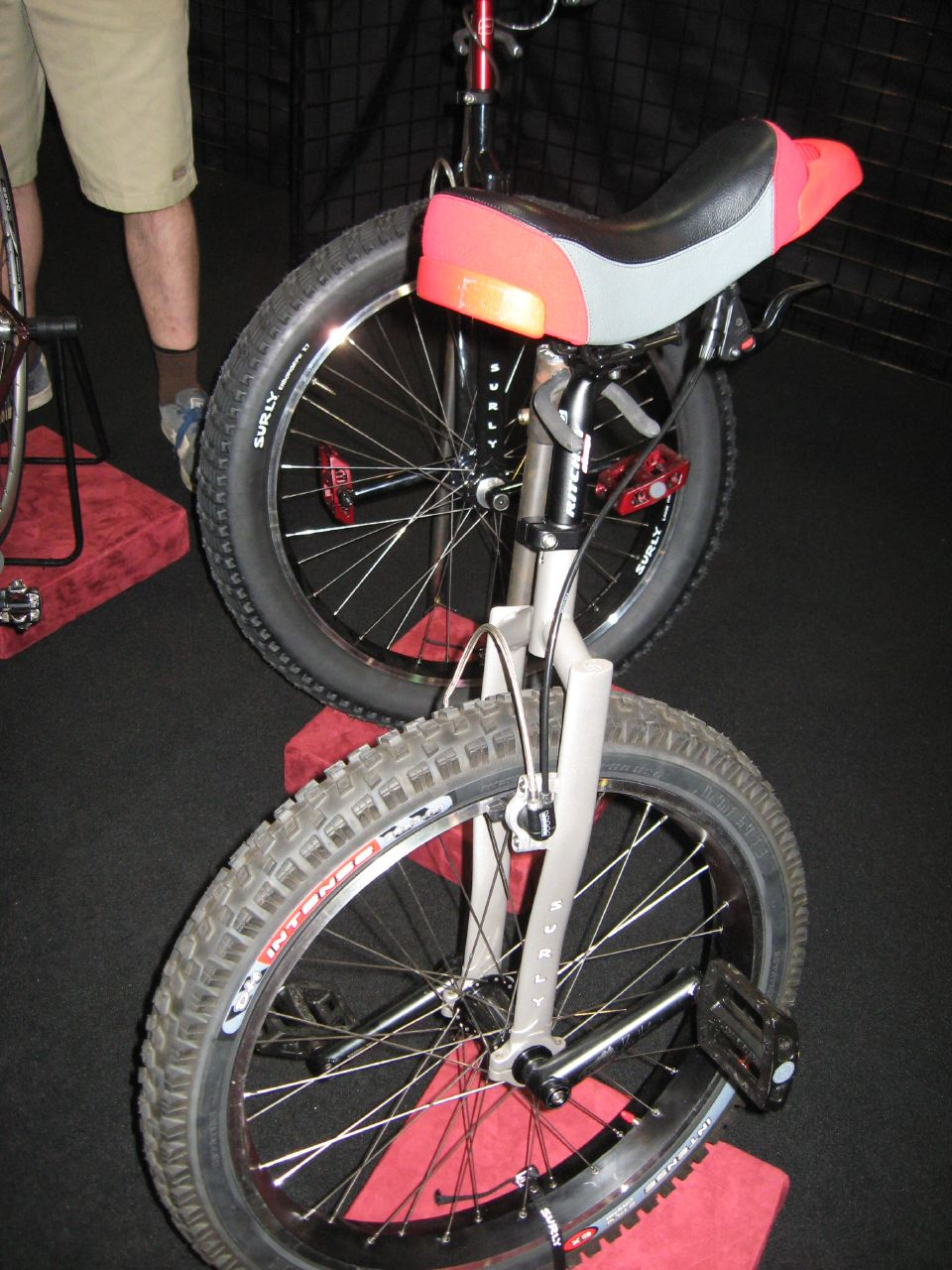
Mountain unicycles (Surly)

== Riders ==
=== Canada ===
- Kris Holm – Mountain unicycling pioneer and founder of Kris Holm Unicycles
- Ryan Kremsater

=== Austria ===
- Gerald Rosenkranz – First finisher of Red Bull Dolomitenmann on a unicycle (2015)
- Markus Pröglhöf

=== Germany ===
- Lutz Eichholz

== See also ==
- Unicycle
- Unicycle trials
- Mountain biking
