= Bezos Family Foundation =

U.S. philanthropic organization

- Formation: 2000; 26 years ago
- President: John E. Deasy
- Chairman: Miguel Bezos
- Co-founders: Jackie Bezos and Miguel Bezos
- Website: www.bezosfamilyfoundation.org

The Bezos Family Foundation is a philanthropic organization based in the United States. It was co-founded by Jackie Bezos and Miguel Bezos in 2000. Jackie Bezos and Miguel Bezos are the parents of Jeff Bezos, founder and former president and CEO of Amazon, as well as the founder and owner of Blue Origin.

== Organization ==
The Bezos Family Foundation was co-founded in 2000 by Jackie and Miguel Bezos, both of whom are major donors. Priorities for the organization include supporting education.

For more than 20 years, Jackie served as president of the foundation, while Miguel served as vice president.

In 2022, Jackie and Mike donated $710.5 million to the Fred Hutchinson Cancer Center.

On July 5, 2023, the Foundation announced John Deasy had been named its new president. Jackie and Miguel Bezos transitioned to co-chairs of the board of directors.

On August 14, 2025, Jackie died following a long battle with Lewy body dementia. Miguel (Mike) Bezos is currently the only chair of foundation's board of directors.
