= Unicon (unicycling) =

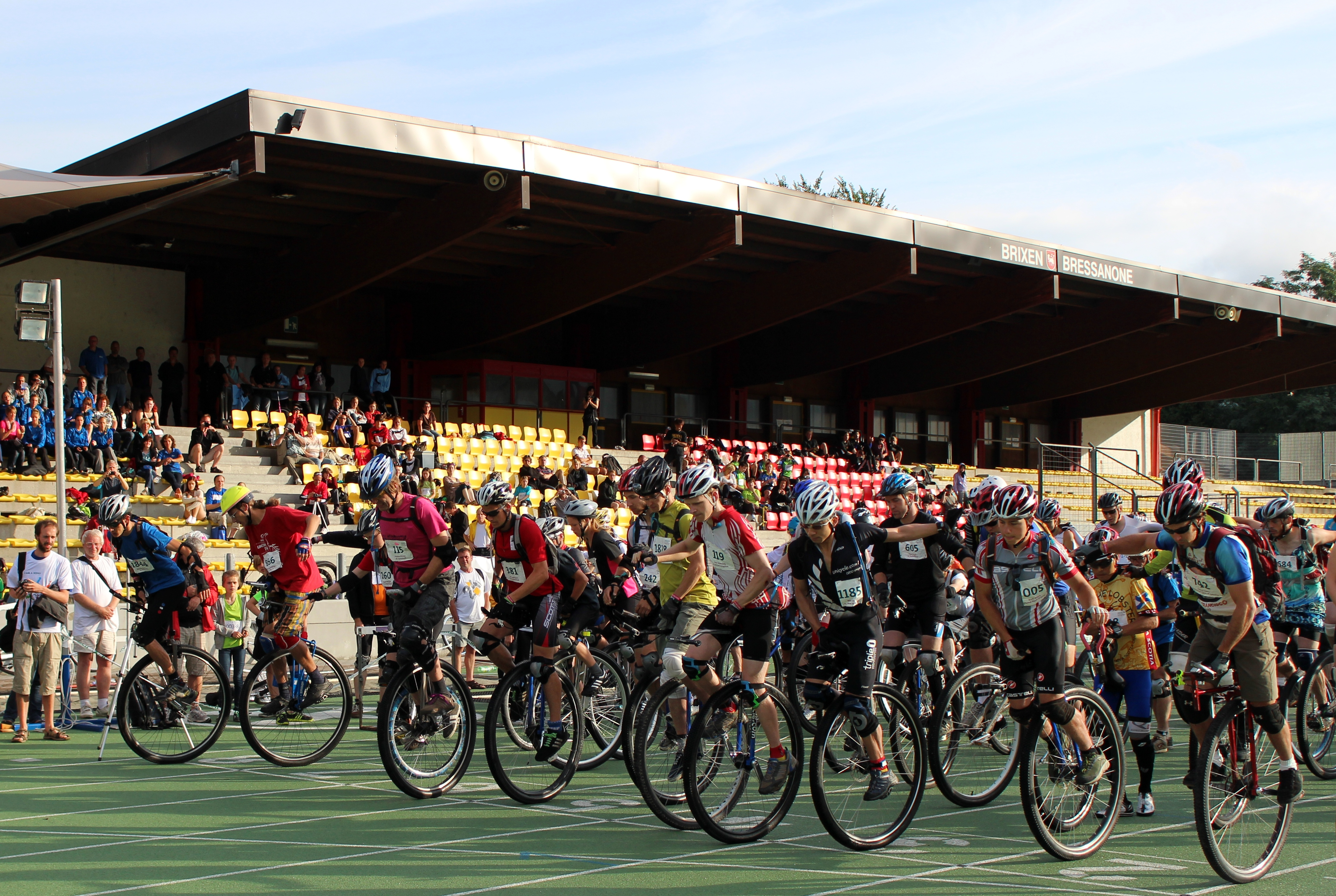
Start of the 100 km race at the Unicon 16 in Brixen 2012

Unicon, previously known as UNICON, is the World Unicycling Convention and Championships sanctioned by the International Unicycling Federation (IUF).

The IUF sanctions a biennial world unicycling convention and competition, the major event on the international unicycling calendar. Events include artistic (such as group, pairs, individual), track racing (such as 100 metres, 400 metres, 800 metres, 30 metres walk the wheel, 50 metres one-foot), road races (such as 10 kilometres, marathon), stillstand, slalom, muni (cross-country, uphill, downhill), street, trials, flatland, basketball and hockey.

== List of Unicons ==
Unicon	Year	Dates	Location
Unicon I	1984		Syracuse, New York, United States
Unicon II	1986		Uniondale, New York, United States
Unicon III	1987		Tokyo, Japan
Unicon IV	1988		Aquadilla, Puerto Rico
Unicon V	1991		Hull, Quebec, Canada
Unicon VI	1992		Quebec City, Quebec, Canada
Unicon VII	1994		Minneapolis, Minnesota, United States
Unicon VIII	1996	5-12 August 1996	Guildford, United Kingdom
Unicon IX	1998	27 July - 2 August	Bottrop, Germany
Unicon X	2000	August	Beijing, China
Unicon XI	2002	25 July - 2 August	North Bend, Washington, United States
Unicon XII	2004	23 July - 1 August	Tokyo, Japan
Unicon XIII	2006	23 July - 2 August	Langenthal and Bern, Switzerland
Unicon XIV	2008	26 July - 4 August	Frederiksberg, Copenhagen, Denmark
Unicon XV	2009/10	27 December - 7 January	Wellington, New Zealand
Unicon XVI	2012	21 July - 31 July	Brixen, Italy
Unicon XVII	2014	30 July - 10 August	Montreal, Quebec, Canada
Unicon XVIII	2016	27 July - 10 August	San Sebastián, Spain
Unicon XIX	2018	29 July - 10 August	Ansan, Korea
Unicon XX	2022	26 July - 6 August	Grenoble, France
Unicon XXI	2024	14 July - 26 July	Bemidji, Minnesota, USA
Unicon XXII	2026	25 July - 7 August	Steyr, Austria

== Unicon XIX records ==
At Unicon 19 in Ansan, Korea, a new record was set by Mike Taylor in the Platform High Jump. Mike successfully landed the high jump of 148.5 cm (58 1/2 inches).
