= International Unicycling Federation =

Unicycling association

The International Unicycling Federation (IUF) is the international governing body for the sport of unicycling. It was founded in 1982 in the United States but is composed of representatives of unicycling nations from around the world. Funding comes from participants at organised events, primarily the biennial Unicon world unicycling championships.

== History ==
The IUF was registered in Nassau County, New York, United States, on 12 March 1985, as a ‘Domestic Not-for-Profit’ corporation. Its principal office is in New York State, and the corporation’s Department of State ID Number is 980300. It operates under the New York State Not-For-Profit Corporation Law. The IUF is registered with the IRS as a 501(c)(3) non-profit organization.

== Purposes ==
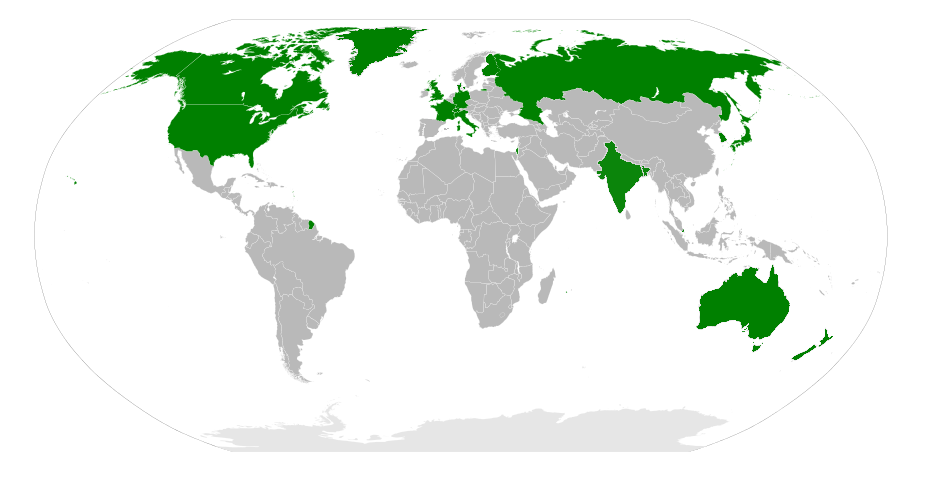
Map of IUF member countries

The purposes of the IUF include:

- 'To foster awareness of and participation in unicycling as a sport and means of recreation among people of all nations through the organization of international conventions and the development of national unicycling organizations'. The IUF selects the location for the biannual unicycling world championships ('Unicon') and works with a European Subcommittee to select the location of the biannual European Championships.
- ‘to promote voluntary international standards for competition toward the achievement of Olympic status for the sport of unicycling’. The IUF develops the IUF Rulebook, which is the governing document for Unicon and other competitions. The By-Laws do not specify which unicycle discipline (freestyle, basketball, hockey, track, high jump, long jump, street, flat, trials, cross country, muni, etc) should be in the Olympics, or whether the IUF’s objective is that all disciplines should be in the Olympics.
- ‘disseminate knowledge and information on all phases of the sport to all interested parties via a newsletter’. The IUF maintains a website and Facebook page to inform members and interested parties about the sport of unicycling.
