= The Everything Store =

2013 book by Brad Stone

The Everything Store: Jeff Bezos and the Age of Amazon
- Author: Brad Stone
- Publisher: Little, Brown and Company
- English publication date: 2013
- Media type: Hardcover
- Pages: 384
- ISBN: 978-0-316-21926-6
- OCLC: 900162756
- Preceded by: Gearheads: the Turbulent Rise of Robotic Sports (2003)
- Followed by: The Upstarts: How Uber, Airbnb, and the Killer Companies of the New Silicon Valley are Changing the World (2017)

The Everything Store: Jeff Bezos and the Age of Amazon is a 2013 bestselling book written by journalist Brad Stone. It documents the rise of Amazon.com in the 1990s, its near demise during the dot-com bust, and its subsequent revival with the inventions of Amazon Prime, the Kindle and Amazon Web Services. It also recounts the childhood and early years of the company's founder Jeff Bezos, including his career on Wall Street working for the quantitative hedge fund D.E. Shaw & Co., LLP. As part of his research, Stone tracked down Ted Jorgensen, Bezos's biological father, who was unaware that his son had become one of the most famous businessmen in the world.

The paperback edition, published in 2014, includes a lengthy email to the author from Amazon’s first CFO, the late Joy Covey.

The book and its findings on Amazon’s internal workings and its relationship with suppliers have been cited in subsequent research and reports from regulators and legislators.

== Reception ==
The book was a New York Times and Wall Street Journal bestseller and has been translated into more than 35 languages. It won the Financial Times Business Book of the Year Award in 2013. It received its first one-star review on Amazon from MacKenzie Bezos, then wife of Jeff Bezos, claiming many inaccuracies while pointing out only one, the timing of Jeff Bezos reading the novel Remains of the Day. Stone was allowed access to many current and former Amazon executives, as well as Bezos’s parents and personal friends, but had only limited interaction with Bezos himself.
