= Brad Stone (journalist) =

American journalist and author (born c. 1971)

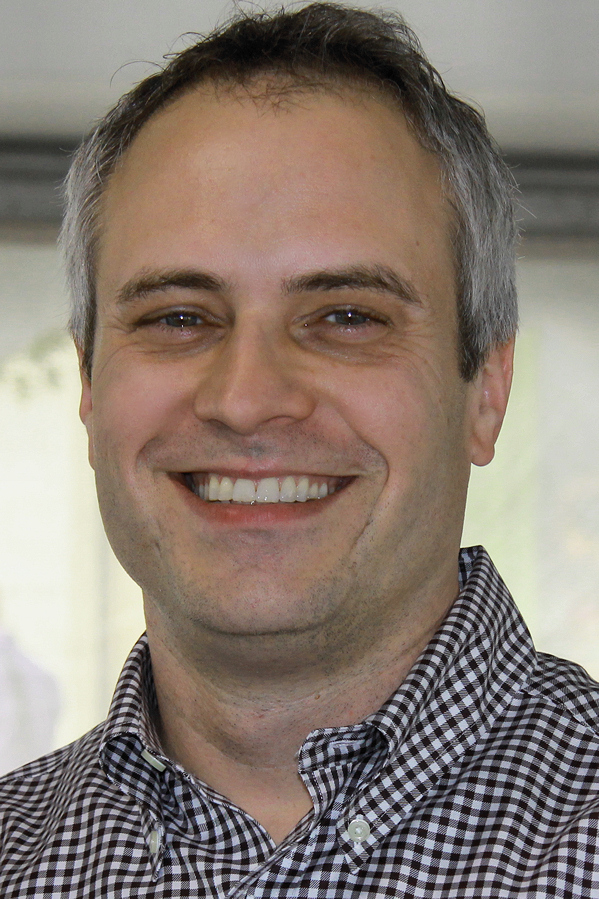
- Stone at the 2013 Texas Book Festival
- Born: c. 1971 (age 54–55)
- Education: Columbia University (BA)
- Occupations: Journalist, author
- Employer: Bloomberg Businessweek
- Known for: Journalism and authorship

Brad Stone (born c. 1971) is an American journalist and author. He is the editor of Bloomberg Businessweek since January 2024. He is the author of the books The Everything Store: Jeff Bezos and the Age of Amazon (2013), Amazon Unbound: Jeff Bezos and the Invention of a Global Empire (2021), The Upstarts: How Uber, Airbnb, and the Killer Companies of the New Silicon Valley are Changing the World, and Gearheads: the Turbulent Rise of Robotic Sports.

== Early life and education ==
Stone was raised in suburban Cleveland, Ohio, and lives in Northern California. He is an alumnus of Columbia University.

== Career ==
Stone is senior executive editor of the global technology group at Bloomberg News and based in Bloomberg's San Francisco bureau. Previously, Stone was a senior writer for Bloomberg Businessweek, for which he has written numerous in-depth cover stories on leading technology companies. Prior to Bloomberg, he was a reporter for The New York Times and Newsweek magazine. Stone is a frequent guest on Bloomberg Technology, a daily show focused on breaking technology news. In January 2024, Stone was appointed editor of Bloomberg Businessweek and will oversee its transition from a weekly to a monthly publication.

== Works ==
In 2003, Simon & Schuster published his first book, Gearheads: The Turbulent Rise of Robotic Sports, about the combat robot culture.

On August 5, 2007, Stone published a story in The New York Times exposing Forbes editor Daniel Lyons as "Fake Steve Jobs", the author of The Secret Diary of Steve Jobs.

On June 28, 2012, Stone wrote in Business Week about his interactions with Frenchman Alexandre Despallieres, an alleged conman with suspected ties to the death of music executive Peter Ikin.

In October 2013, Little, Brown & Co. published Stone's book The Everything Store about the rise of Amazon.com. Stone's reporting for the book led to the discovery of Jeff Bezos's biological father, an Arizona-based bike shop owner, who was previously unaware that his son was the founder and CEO of Amazon.com.

In January 2017, Little, Brown & Co. published The Upstarts: How Uber, Airbnb, and the Killer Companies of the New Silicon Valley Are Changing the World.

In May 2021, Simon & Schuster published Amazon Unbound: Jeff Bezos and the Invention of a Global Empire, about Amazon's rise to become a trillion-dollar company and Bezos's emergence as the wealthiest person in the world.

== Awards and honors ==
- 2013 Financial Times and Goldman Sachs Business Book of the Year Award, winner for The Everything Store
