= South Edmonton Common =

Shopping and entertainment district in Alberta, Canada

- Location: Edmonton, Alberta, Canada
- Opened: April 1998; 28 years ago
- Developer: Cameron Development Corporation & Grosvener Canada
- Owner: Cameron Development Corp.
- Num. of stores: more than 150
- Num. of anchor tenants: 7
- Floor area: 2,300,000 sq ft (210,000 m^{2})
- Public transit: 56 512 518 519
- Website: southedmontoncommon.com

South Edmonton Common is Canada's largest retail power centres, and when it will be completely developed, it will spread over 320 acres (130 ha) and contain some 2,300,000 square feet (210,000 m^{2}) of retail space, making it one of the largest open-air retail developments in North America. The Common is located in south Edmonton, Alberta, extending from 23rd Avenue south to Anthony Henday Drive, and east from Gateway Boulevard to Parsons Road.

The Common has a large base of retail tenants that provide various goods and services. The first tenant in the Commons was The Home Depot, which opened in April 1998. Anchor tenants at South Edmonton Common include Canadian Tire (the chain's largest location), IKEA, Cineplex Cinemas, Sport Chek, Rona+, Real Canadian Superstore, and Walmart. Other stores include Staples, Best Buy, Marshalls, Lindt, and Mountain Equipment Company.

== Store openings and closures ==
=== Compusmart ===
Hartco Income Fund, the company that owns Compusmart, began shutting down its 15 Compusmart locations in May 2007. Originally, the South Edmonton Common location was not one of the first five to be shut down; however, it was quickly sold as well. It is currently occupied by Party City.

=== Walmart ===
Walmart initially opened in 1998 where as one of the first two retailers to open in South Common, the other being The Home Depot. It relocated from its former location in the nearby Heritage Mall.

On November 7, 2007, the newest Walmart Supercentre opened on the south end of South Edmonton Common, replacing the former retail location at Parsons Road and 21 Avenue. Konto Furniture, Sofa Land, Cameron Homes, and Crystal Glass now share the space of the former Walmart.

The Walmart Supercentre has a full indoor garden centre, a fully serviced grocery store including meat, produce, bakery and floral. All former services such as McDonald's, optometrists, photo finishing and portrait studio are available at the new location.

Walmart is the only tenant of the shopping centre that is east of Parsons Road.

=== Future Shop ===
On September 19, 2008, the Edmonton Journal reported Future Shop would be opening its largest store in Canada at 53,000 square feet (4,900 m^{2}). The location featured a larger, 53,000 square-foot layout and an updated store concept. The store, along with 65 other Future Shop stores, closed on March 28, 2015. and in August 2015, Spirit Halloween took the spot for 2 months, then leaving one anchor tenant vacant. Sport Chek, which opened in fall 2016, replaced Future Shop.

== Anchors ==
- Canadian Tire - opened 2016
- Cineplex Odeon - opened 2000 (IMAX opened 2024)
- IKEA - opened 2003
- Rona+ - opened 2023, formerly Lowe's
- Real Canadian Superstore - opened 2003
- Sport Chek - opened 2016, formerly Future Shop
- The Home Depot - opened 1998
- Walmart Supercentre - opened 2007

== Junior anchors ==
- Ashley Furniture
- Best Buy
- Bulk Barn - formerly A Buck or Two
- Dollarama - two locations
- Dollar Tree - formerly Pier 1 Imports
- Gap Factory Store
- Golf Town
- H&M
- HomeSense
- Indigo
- Laura
- La-Z-Boy
- London Drugs
- Mark's
- Marshalls
- MEC - opened 2016, formerly Sears Home
- Michaels
- Old Navy
- PartSource
- Party City - opened 2017, formerly Compusmart (Laptop Depot)
- Planet Fitness - opened 2022, formerly Home Outfitters
- Running Room
- Staples
- The Brick
- The Rec Room
- Thriftys by Bluenotes - formerly Atmosphere
- Urban Planet
- Winners - formerly Target Apparel, and Designer Depot

== Former anchors/junior anchors ==
- A Buck or Two - now Bulk Barn
- Atmosphere - closed 2025, now Thriftys By Bluenotes
- Babies "R" Us - closed 2025, formerly buybuy BABY
- buybuy BABY - closed 2023
- Bed Bath & Beyond - closed 2023
- Cleo
- Coast Mountain Sports - later Atmosphere, now Thriftys By Bluenotes
- Compusmart (Laptop Depot) - closed 2010, now Party City
- Designer Depot - formerly Target Apparel, now Winners
- Future Shop - closed 2015, now Sport Chek
- Home Outfitters - closed 2019, now Planet Fitness
- Lowe's - closed 2023, now Rona+
- Nordstrom Rack - closed 2023
- Pier 1 Imports - closed 2020, now Dollar Tree
- Rooms + Spaces - closed 2024, formerly Bed Bath & Beyond
- Saks Off 5th - closed 2022, now Winners
- Sears Home - closed 2015, now MEC
- Target Apparel - closed 2015, formerly Designer Deopt, now Winners
- Walmart (old location) - closed 2007, now Sofa Land, Konto Furniture, Cameron Homes, and Crystal Glass
- Wholesale Sports - closed 2017, now Sofa Land, Konto Furniture, Cameron Homes, and Crystal Glass, formerly Walmart
