= Canadian Tire money =

Canadian retail loyalty program

argent Canadian Tire (French)
- 5¢, 10¢, 25¢, 50¢, $1, & $2 Canadian Tire coupons

Units of account
- Symbol: $

Denominations
- Banknotes: 18 denominations from 1¢ to $100
- Coins: $1

Demographics
- User(s): Canadian Tire customers and other businesses in Canada

Issuance
- Central bank: Canadian Tire
- Printer: Canadian Bank Note Company & British American Banknote Company.
- Mint: Royal Canadian Mint (1 Dollar coin only)

Canadian Tire money, officially Canadian Tire "money" or CTM, is a loyalty program operated by the Canadian retail chain Canadian Tire Corporation (CTC). It consists of both paper coupons introduced in 1958 and used in Canadian Tire stores as scrip, and since 2012 in a digital form introduced as Canadian Tire Money Advantage, rebranded in 2018 as Triangle Rewards. Issuance of paper Canadian Tire Money ended in 2020. Canadian Tire Money has been noted as the most successful loyalty program in Canadian retail history.

Canadian Tire Money is denominated in Canadian dollars. It is earned based on the pre-tax amount of a purchase, excluding labour and shop supplies costs. The initial rate earned was 5% of the eligible purchase price, but it was lowered to 3%, then to 1.4% and now is 0.4%.

When used to pay for merchandise, CTM is considered to be a cash equivalent and may be used to pay for any part of a purchase, including sales taxes. CTM cannot be exchanged for real Canadian currency.

== Paper Canadian Tire money coupons ==
Paper CTM coupons resemble real banknotes. The notes are printed on paper similar to what Canadian currency was printed on when they were still paper, and were jointly produced by two of the country's long-established security printers, British American Banknote Company (BABN) and Canadian Bank Note Company (CBN). Paper CTM could be earned and redeemed only at Canadian Tire stores, although some other private businesses may choose to accept it as payment.

Paper CTM was earned only when customers pay with cash, debit cards, or Canadian Tire money. No paper CTM was earned on purchases made by credit card.

Issuance and redemption of paper CTM was suspended in March 2020 as a result of the COVID-19 pandemic in Canada. Redemption was resumed in July 2020 and is still permitted as of January 2026. As of May 2023, the corporation has no plans to resume paper CTM issuance other than for special commemorative issues.

=== History ===
Canadian Tire Money coupons were introduced in 1958 at CTC's gas bar located at Yonge and Davenport streets in Toronto. They were inspired by Muriel Billes, the wife of Canadian Tire's co-founder and first president, Alfred J. Billes, as a response to the promotional giveaways that many gas companies offered at the time. It was only available at Canadian Tire gas bars but was so successful that, in 1961, it was extended to the retail stores as well. Until 1992, there were separate issues of coupons redeemable either at Canadian Tire gas bars, or Canadian Tire retail stores.

Canadian Tire money coupons were issued and redeemable only at Canadian Tire stores in Eastern Canada until 1995, when the program was launched to all locations nationwide.

Since 1961, the coupons have featured an engraving of "Sandy McTire", who sports a tam o' shanter and a stylized waxed moustache. A fictional character based on no specific individual, he is assumed to represent a thrifty Scotsman, the 1950s everyman of blue-collar Canada.

=== Denominations ===
CTM coupons that were actively issued at the program's suspension in 2020 were produced in denominations of 5, 10, 25, and 50 cents, as well as one and two dollars.

Canadian Tire Money coupon denominations
Denomination	First issued	Last issued	Note
1¢	1962	1962	
2¢	1962	1962	
3¢	1962	1976	A small quantity was issued in 1991
4¢	1962	1962	
5¢	1958	2020	
10¢	1958	2020	A commemorative 10 cent note was released by the company between June 30 and July 2, 2017, to celebrate the 150th anniversary of the Confederation of Canada in 1867 as part of national festivities.
15¢	1962	1962	
20¢	1962	1962	
25¢	1958	2020	
30¢	1962	1962	
35¢	1962	1962	
40¢	1962	1962	
45¢	1962	1962	
50¢	1958	2020	
60¢	1962	1962	
$1	1958	2020	
$2	1989	2020	
$100	2022	2022	95 were issued as part of a social media promotion celebrating the 100th anniversary of Canadian Tire.

=== Usage beyond Canadian Tire ===
- In late 2004 in Moncton, New Brunswick, several customers at a Canadian Imperial Bank of Commerce ATM were dispensed a total of 11 bills of Canadian Tire money instead of real bills. They were compensated by the bank.
- Culturally, Canadian Tire money is sometimes referred to by comedians: perhaps as a national version of "Monopoly money", perhaps invoking a pejorative comparison of the value of Canadian dollars against U.S. dollars, or perhaps as a misunderstood exotic element of Canadian society (e.g. Ron James's comedic reference to the person depicted on the bill as "our king"). In the 2009 Trailer Park Boys movie Countdown to Liquor Day, Jim Lahey offers Julian $700 in Canadian Tire money for his trailer.
- In the mid-1990s, a man in Germany was caught with up to $11 million in counterfeit Canadian Tire money. It was recovered before he left for Canada to redeem it.
- In 2012, musician Corin Raymond funded his album Paper Nickels partially through a fundraising campaign inviting fans to donate their unused Canadian Tire money.

== Coins ==
On December 2, 2009, as part of an advertised deal, Canadian Tire had handed out the first Canadian Tire coin, redeemable with the purchase of at least $40 of merchandise. Another similar deal followed in 2010 (coinciding with the 2010 Olympic Winter Games), with a three-coin winter collection. The coins can be spent in the same manner as conventional CTM.

== Electronic Canadian Tire money ==
A digital version of Canadian Tire Money was introduced in 2012 as Canadian Tire Money Advantage, which was earned by presenting a loyalty card. This was expanded in 2014 to holders of the Options credit card issued by Canadian Tire Financial Services (CTFS).

In April 2018, Canadian Tire Money Advantage program was replaced with the Triangle Rewards loyalty program for the earning of digital Canadian Tire Money ("eCTM"). The Triangle Rewards program expanded the earning and redemption of eCTM from Canadian Tire stores to the rest of Canadian Tire Corporation's family of stores (as well as their French-Canadian equivalents), currently-including Mark's, Sport Chek, Sports Experts, PartSource, the Canadian operations of Party City and Pro Hockey Life participating stores.

Unlike with paper Canadian Tire money, eCTM can be earned on purchases paid for with a credit card. Extra eCTMs is earned when paying with a Triangle credit card issued by CTFS.

== See also ==
- Canadian Tire Bank
- Loyalty program
- Numismatics
- Banknote
- Company scrip
