= St. Albert Centre =

St Albert Centre
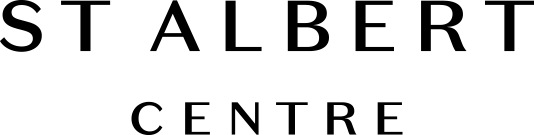
- Location: 375 St Albert Trail; St. Albert, Alberta, Canada
- Coordinates: 53.6426°N 113.6237°W
- Address: 375 St Albert Trail, St. Albert, AB T8N 3K8
- Opened: 1980
- Manager: Jillian Creech
- Owner: Leyad
- Num. of stores: 80
- Num. of anchor tenants: 5
- Floor area: 373,000 sq ft (34,700 m^{2})
- Floors: 1
- Parking: 1000+
- Public transit: St. Albert Centre Exchange
- Website: www.stalbertcentre.com

St. Albert Centre is located in St. Albert, Alberta, and is located along the prominent roadways St Albert Trail and Bellerose Drive. St. Albert Centre is home to over 80 Stores and Services which includes a 35,000 square feet (3,300 m^{2}) Sport Chek/Atmosphere. The Centre is anchored by Winners and Sport Chek. London Drugs and Mark's joined the tenancy mix in May 2016.

Health Foods retailer Morning Sun, British cosmetics and skin care company The Body Shop, and Canadian apparel company, Mark's, opened in the Centre in July 2016. The former Target space underwent an extensive redevelopment in 2017 to add 17+ new retail units, along with a new entrance with access off of Bellerose Drive to the Centre. Winners relocated and opened a larger concept store in the former Target space in 2017.

== General information ==
Located ten minutes northwest of Edmonton, St. Albert Centre is the only enclosed regional Shopping Centre located in the City of St. Albert.

This redevelopment of the former Target premise consists of 117,000 square feet of improved area, consisting of new retail space, a new mall entrance and common areas, a new branded exterior façade, and new public washrooms. The layout is designed to provide expanded anchor and fashion uses to the Centre while improving circulation throughout the mall with a new racetrack design. Completed in August 2017, Phase 1 included the new entrance, restrooms, London Drugs, Winners, and Mark’s with over 20 additional retailers opening in the new mall wing between now and winter 2018. Phase 2, which included an upgraded main entrance, was completed in December 2017.

Anchors:

- London Drugs - opened 2016, also formerly Target
- Mark's - opened 2016, also formerly Target
- Sport Chek
- Winners - moved in 2017 from a space that is now Ardene, formerly Target
- Canadian Tire - freestanding, opened in the early 1990s

Former Anchors:

- Hudson's Bay - opened with the mall in 1980, closed 2025.
- Target - opened May 6, 2013, formerly Zellers, closed 2015, redeveloped into 17 new retail units
- Walmart Canada - opened 1994, relocated 2001, became Zellers.
- Woolco - opened 1979, became Wal-Mart in 1994.
- Zellers - opened 2001, closed 2012, became Target in 2013.
