= Muncaster (disambiguation) =

Muncaster is a civil parish in Cumbria, North West England.

Muncaster may also refer to:

- Muncaster Castle, near Ravenglass in Cumbria, England
  - Baron Muncaster, a now extinct title, held by the family who lived at Muncaster Castle, in Muncaster
- Ben Muncaster (born 2001), Scottish rugby player
- Harriet Muncaster (born 1988), English writer and illustrator
- Joseph Dean Muncaster (1933–2012), Canadian businessman
- Muncaster Mountain, a peak in the state of Washington, US
