= CTFS =

CTFS can refer to:

- Canadian Tire Financial Services
- Continuous-time Fourier series
- "Capture The Flag Strike" of Threewave CTF in Quake III Arena.
- Center for Tropical Forest Science of the Smithsonian Tropical Research Institute
- Creative and Tactical Fighting Systems
