= MotoMaster =

Canadian Tire private label

MotoMaster is the in-house line of automotive products sold exclusively at Canadian Tire stores. MotoMaster products ranged from oil filters and air filters, to MotoMaster branded tires. As of 2011, MotoMaster was the most popular replacement tire brand in Canada, with 13% market share by unit volume of the passenger replacement tire market and 10% market share by unit volume of the light truck replacement tire market.

== Overview ==
MotoMaster uses several sub-brands to distinguish its product lines. "Eliminator" identifies premium automotive batteries, booster packs and battery chargers. The 'Rough Rider' light truck tire line was recently replaced by 'Total Terrain'. 'Formula 1' was originally launched for synthetic oils but later expanded after other lines were discontinued to include conventional, diesel, marine, transmission and power steering oils, as well as various gear oils. The Supreme sub-brand still exists as an entry-level oil product. 'Mastercraft' is their mid-range tool line, such as screwdrivers and socket sets, while Mastercraft Maximum is the premium tool brand. JobMate is a rebranded entry-level tool line sold by Canadian Tire.

== Decline ==
The MotoMaster line has shrunk somewhat in recent years as the store has moved towards brand-name products. For example, in early 2003, the line of MotoMaster spark plugs were fully discontinued in favour of carrying only brand names such as Champion, NGK, AC Delco, and Bosch. In 2004, the Formula 1 line of oil filters was discontinued, and in 2002, the 'Motomaster 60' line of batteries was replaced with the more generic 'Sure Start'. One reason for the gradual reduction of the MotoMaster line is the existence of the PartSource chain, of which 63 locations are fully owned and operated by the Canadian Tire Corporation as of May 2007. Though these stores carry many of the same products and share much of their supply chain, Part Source operates at arm's length from Canadian Tire but shares some backoffice operations.

Although the MotoMaster name remains on many tire models, the selection has shrunk. In 2004, MotoMaster discontinued the Sentinel A/S and Touring 160 tires, leaving the brand with the Touring AW/H and SE2 lines. MotoMaster also dropped its Performance tire line, and Canadian Tire no longer has a separate Premium Tire category, having merged it into the Touring categories.

Some regard MotoMaster as an entry-level line of tires despite the tires being produced for Canadian Tire by larger companies such as Michelin (SE2), Cooper (SE3, Winter Edge) and BF Goodrich. Some tires such as Goodyear Nordic winter tires are exclusive to Canadian Tire but not marketed under the MotoMaster umbrella.
