= John William Billes =

Canadian businessman (1895–1956)

- Born: 4 December 1895; Toronto, Ontario
- Died: 16 November 1956 (aged 60); Toronto, Ontario
- Spouse: Gladys Maud Dickson (m. 1924)

John William Billes (4 December 1895 – 16 November 1956) was a Canadian businessman and co-founder of Canadian Tire. He was the president of 150 dealer-operated stores across the country.

== Early life and education ==
Born in Toronto, Ontario, Billes was educated at the old Dufferin school.

== Career ==
In 1922, J. William Billes and his brother Alfred Jackson Billes bought Hamilton Tire and Garage Ltd. in Toronto. The following year they moved the garage to downtown Toronto where they began the conversion to a garage/retail business. In 1927 they incorporated under the name Canadian Tire Corporation Ltd. with William Billes as its President.

In 1934, Canadian Tire opened its first official associate store in Hamilton, Ontario and over the next twenty years the Billes brothers expanded into a full line of automotive products and then added home and garden supplies. William Billes oversaw the most successful Canadian owned and operated franchise in the country's history that would expand into a nationwide network of dealer operated associate stores. He died unexpectedly in November 1956 as a result of complications from pernicious anaemia. He bequeathed his shares in Canadian Tire to twenty-three different charitable organizations.

== Death and legacy ==
Following its formation in 1979, William Billes was inducted posthumously into the Canadian Business Hall of Fame.
