= Sherwood Hockey =

Canadian ice hockey brand

- Product type: Ice hockey equipment
- Current owner: Canadian Tire (2018–)
- Country: Canada
- Introduced: 1949
- Previous owners: Sherwood-Drolet Ltd. (1949–2008); Sher-Wood Hockey Inc. (2008–2014); Sherwood Athletics Group (2014–2018)
- Website: sherwoodhockey.com

Sherwood, sometimes styled as Sher-Wood, is a Canadian brand of ice hockey equipment owned by the Canadian Tire Corporation through its subsidiary INA International. The brand was created in 1949 in Sherbrooke, Quebec, by Léo Paul Drolet, and was manufactured originally by his company Sherbrooke Woodcraft. In 1961, Drolet formed a second company called Sher-Wood Hockey Sticks, which merged in 1969 with Sherbrooke Woodcraft to form the Sherwood-Drolet Corp. After a fire at the Sherwood factory in 1969, Figgie International of Cleveland acquired a majority stake in the company.

In 1991, Léo's son Denis Drolet succeeded his father as president. That year, the company expanded beyond hockey sticks and began producing protective equipment. Denis reacquired control of his father's company from Figgie in 1994, and until 2008, Sherwood-Drolet and its sister company Inglasco were owned by his holding company, the Groupe Drolet Inc.

Sherwood-Drolet filed for bankruptcy in 2008, and that year its assets were acquired by Carpe Diem Growth Capital and reorganised into a new company. In 2014, the company was purchased by the Gracious Living Corporation and reorganised again. In 2018, the Canadian Tire Corporation purchased all of Sherwood's trademarks, and since that time the name has existed only as a brand rather than a company. Sherwood is part of Canadian Tire's group of hockey brands, which includes Hespeler and Victoriaville also.

== History ==
=== Drolet family era, 1949–2008 ===
The Sher-Wood brand of hockey stick originated in the business Sherbrooke Woodcraft Limited, which was founded in 1949 by Léo Drolet (1919–2001) in Sherbrooke. The name Sher-Wood was created as a portmanteau of "Sherbrooke" and "Woodcraft." The Sherbrooke name itself came from John Coape Sherbrooke, whose family name derived from the town of Shirebrook. In 1961, Drolet formed the Sher-Wood Hockey Sticks Corp. Ltd. In 1969, Drolet merged Sherbrooke Woodcraft and Sher-Wood Hockey to form Sherwood-Drolet Corp. Ltd.

In the early hours of 17 July 1969, a fire engulfed the Sherwood-Drolet factory, shutting down business temporarily. Allegedly, the fire was started by a disgruntled employee who had been fired recently. The fire occurred while the plant was shut down for summer holidays. As insurance covered only a third the cost of the damage, Drolet was forced to sell control of his company to pay for reconstruction. In the spring of 1970, Drolet sold an 80 per cent stake in his company to Rowan Industries Inc. of Oceanport, New Jersey. However, on the return flight from Sherbrooke to Newark after completing the acquisition, the company's chartered Cessna 402 crashed, killing four of its executives, including its president and chairman. After the crash, Figgie International Inc. of Cleveland acquired Rowan's stake in Sherwood-Drolet.

In 1991, Léo was replaced as president by his son Denis Drolet (1951–2023). One of Denis's first projects was to expand beyond hockey stick manufacturing into protective equipment.

On 25 November 1994, Denis and his brother Michel formed the holding company Groupe Drolet Inc. On 1 December 1994, the Groupe Drolet purchased the Sherwood-Drolet Corp. from Figgie International for around $15 million. After 25 years of American ownership, Sherwood was once again a Canadian-owned business. The Groupe Drolet also held Denis's other company, Inglasco.

=== Carpe Diem and Gracious Living ownership, 2008–2018 ===
In May 2008, Sherwood-Drolet filed for bankruptcy. A month later, its assets were purchased by Carpe Diem Growth Capital through a newly formed company called Sher-Wood Hockey Inc. In September 2008, Sher-Wood Hockey Inc. acquired the assets of Inglasco from the Groupe Drolet. The acquisition streak continued in December 2008, when Sher-Wood Hockey acquired the assets of the TPS Sports Group, the former hockey division of Hillerich & Bradsby. In 2011, Sher-Wood moved the bulk of its production from Sherbrooke to Asia. At some point before 2014, Sherwood's ownership transferred to Callidus Capital Inc.

In September 2014, the Gracious Living Corporation, a furniture manufacturing company in Woodbridge, Ontario, purchased the assets of Sher-Wood Hockey and Inglasco. It reorganised Sher-Wood into a new company called the Sherwood Athletics Group Inc., which had two divisions: a manufacturing arm called Sher-Wood Hockey (GL) Inc. and a marketing arm called Sher-Wood Sports Licencing Inc.

=== Sher-Wood as a brand, 2018– ===
In February 2018, the Canadian Tire Corporation purchased all of Sherwood's trademarks from Gracious Living. The purchase was executed by INA International Ltd., a subsidiary of FGL Sports (formerly the Forzani Group Limited), which is itself a subsidiary of Canadian Tire. The head office of INA is in Calgary, Alberta. The acquisition of the Sherwood brand added to Canadian Tire's group of hockey brands, which includes Hespeler and Victoriaville. Inglasco remains a property of Gracious Living.
