= Canadian Tire =

Canadian retail company

Canadian Tire Corporation, Limited
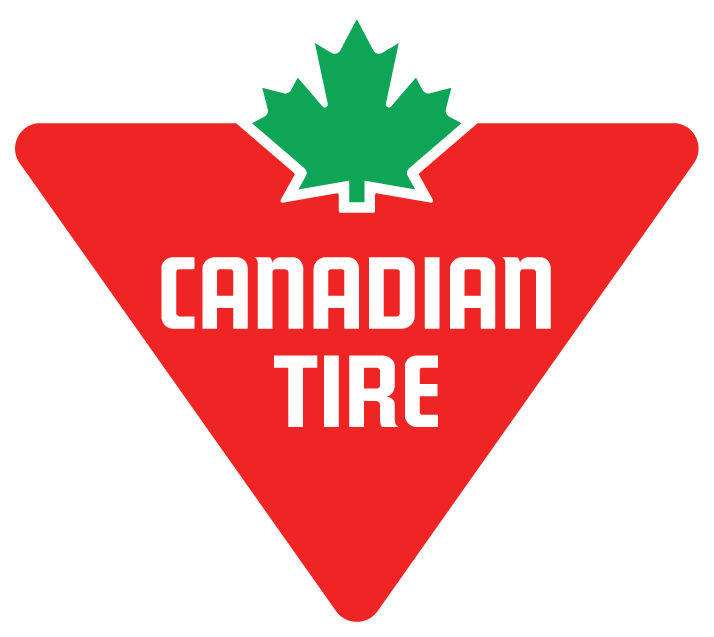

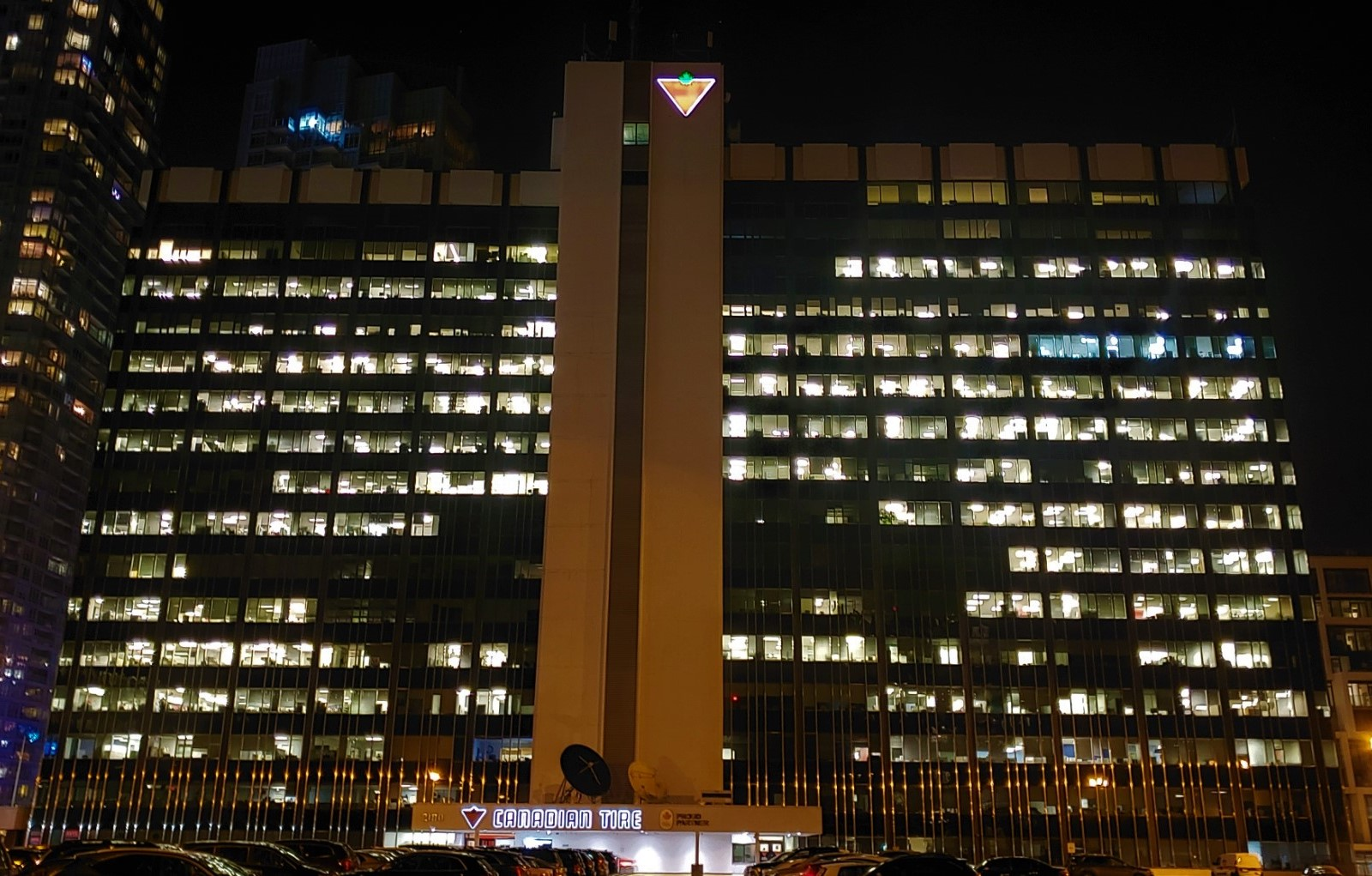
- Exterior of the Canadian Tire headquarters (2020)
- Trade name: Canadian Tire
- Type: Public
- Traded as: TSX: CTC (voting); TSX: CTC.A (non-voting); OTCID Basic: CDNAF (Class A); OTCID Basic: CDNTF (Ordinary)
- Industry: Retail
- Founded: October 24, 1922; 104 years ago in Toronto, Ontario, Canada
- Founders: Alfred Jackson Billes; John William Billes
- Headquarters: Canada Square, Toronto, Ontario, Canada
- Number of locations: 1,686 (Note: Store count includes 504 Canadian Tire, 409 FGL Sports, 386 Mark's, and 91 PartSource locations; and 297 gas stations.) (2018)
- Area served: Canada
- Key people: Greg Hicks (president and CEO)
- Products: Automotive; sports; leisure; home products
- Brands: At Canadian Tire department stores: Frank; Mastercraft; MotoMaster; NOMA; Woods; Yardworks; At FGL Sports stores: Dakota; Denver Hayes; WindRiver
- Revenue: ▲CA$17.810 billion (2022)
- Net income: ▲CA$1.182 billion (2022)
- Total assets: ▲CA$22.102 billion (2022)
- Number of employees: 58,000
- Subsidiaries: Canadian Tire (department store); Canadian Tire Bank; Canadian Tire Gas+; Mark's; PartSource; Party City Canada; Petco Canada; Sher-Wood; Sport Chek; Sports Experts; Hudson's Bay Company (intellectual property)
- Website: canadiantire.ca; corp.canadiantire.ca

Canadian Tire Corporation, Limited (Note: French: Société Canadian Tire Limitée) (doing business as Canadian Tire) is a Canadian retail corporation, headquartered at Canada Square in Toronto, Ontario. It operates department stores, gas stations (Canadian Tire Petroleum), and financial services (Canadian Tire Bank). The company also owns and operates Mark's, PartSource, Sherwood Hockey, Sport Chek, Sports Experts, and the Canadian operations of Party City and Petco. It owns the intellectual property of the former Hudson's Bay Company as of 2025.

Canadian Tire acquired the Norwegian clothing and textile company Helly Hansen from the Ontario Teachers' Pension Plan in 2018 and sold it in 2025. It participates in the voluntary Scanner Price Accuracy Code managed by the Retail Council of Canada.

== History ==
On October 24, 1922, John William Billes and Alfred Jackson Billes invested their combined savings of $1,800 in the Hamilton Tire and Garage Ltd. (established in 1909 as the Hamilton Garage and Rubber Company) in Toronto. Hamilton Tire and Garage specialized in buying tires at a discount from manufacturers in the winter then reselling the tires during the busy summer season. The brothers opened a retail store at Yonge and Gould Streets in Toronto, Ontario.

A product focus on tires was emphasized in 1927 with the incorporation of the name Canadian Tire Corporation Limited because, as A. J. Billes said, "... it sounded big". During 1928, the first Canadian Tire catalogues were distributed, consisting of price lists along with road maps.

In 1934, the first official Associate Store was opened in Hamilton, Ontario, by Walker Anderson on King Street. In 1944, to fund its growth, Canadian Tire Corporation became a public company and sold 100,000 shares. By 1945, there were 110 Canadian Tire stores. In 1946, an employee stock purchasing plan was implemented to encourage employee loyalty while discouraging unionization.

The first gas bar opened in 1958 at the corner of Yonge and Church streets in Toronto. Canadian Tire money that gave gas bar customers an in-store discount began the same year. By June 1961, there were 31 locations. The small financial services company Midland Shoppers Credit Limited was purchased in 1968 and renamed Canadian Tire Acceptance, Limited.

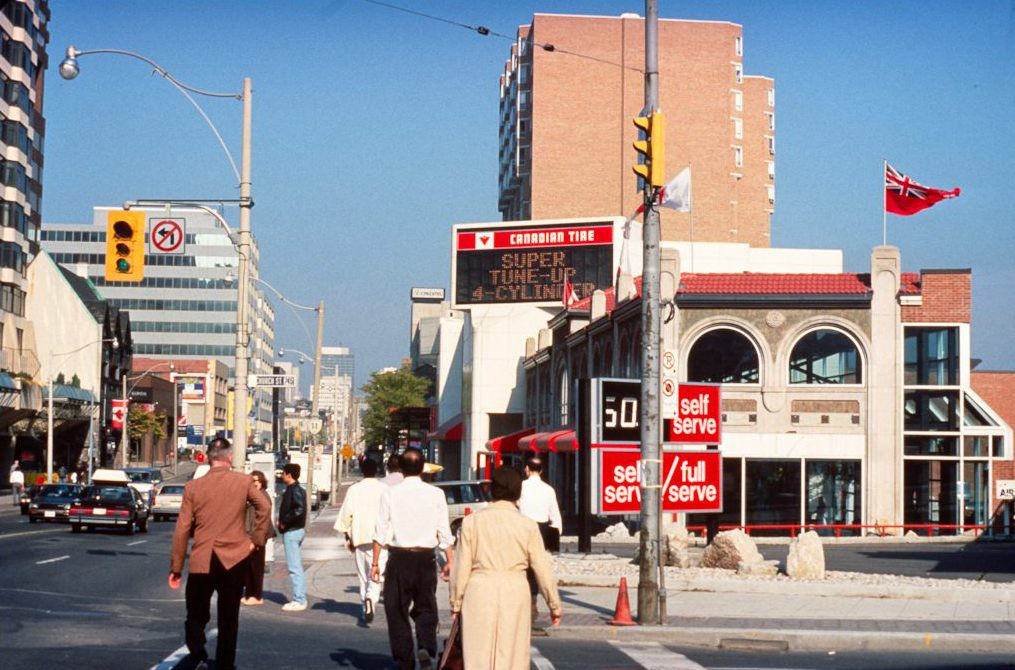
A Canadian Tire store with a gas bar in Toronto, 1990

Canadian Tire entered the clothing market by acquiring Mark's Work Wearhouse in 2001.

In 2003, CTC established the Canadian Tire Bank, under Canada's Bank Act, from its then-named Canadian Tire Financial Services, Limited, subsidiary along with its Mastercard portfolio, which was later renamed as Canadian Tire Services, Limited, effective January 1, 2015. CTC sold 20% of its Canadian Tire Bank to Scotiabank in 2014; it later repurchased this stake in 2023.

In April 2018, Triangle Rewards was launched as a replacement to the digital My Canadian Tire Money program and Options Mastercard. Traditional paper Canadian Tire money continued to be offered at some Canadian Tire stores until 2020 for customers without a rewards card, though at a reduced rate.

In May 2018, the company extended further into the clothing market by acquiring Helly Hansen, but sold the brand to Kontoor Brands Inc. in 2025. As of December 2021, the company operates 667 Canadian Tire stores, 397 SportChek stores, and 381 Mark's stores. The current President and CEO is Greg Hicks.

On May 15, 2025, Canadian Tire announced the acquisition of the Hudson's Bay Company brands and its intellectual property for $30 million CAD. The transaction was approved by a court on June 3. Under the agreement, Canadian Tire would assume ownership of the Hudson's Bay name, trade marks, logos, slogans, coat of arms and the stripes pattern. It also acquired a number of former brands including Home Outfitters. The Zellers name was not part of the deal, but the retailer's former slogan, "Lowest price is the law", was.

=== U.S. expansion attempts ===
Canadian Tire tried twice to expand into the United States. In 1982, it purchased the Wichita Falls, Texas–based White Stores, Inc. automotive retail chain with 81 stores in Texas from its then-owner Household Merchandising Inc., a subsidiary of Household Finance, for US$40.2 million. In 1986, after losing nearly US$100 million, they closed some stores and sold the remaining 40 stores, three warehouses and other White assets to Kansas City, Missouri-based Western Auto Supply.

The second time, during the early 1990s, Canadian Tire tried to open a specialized auto parts chain called Auto Source that attempted to have 25,000 different parts or more on the shelf in each store, more than its competitors. The first Auto Source was opened in Indianapolis in 1991. Unlike the previous attempt, the Auto Source concept was built from scratch. During the next three years, Canadian Tire opened two Auto Source stores each in Indianapolis, Cincinnati, Dayton, Columbus and Louisville for a total of ten stores before abruptly closing the money-losing chain in 1995. Some of the stores were sold to Pep Boys.

Although Auto Source lost nearly CA$60 million during its four years of existence, a scaled-down version was used in Canada under the PartSource brand.

== Brands ==
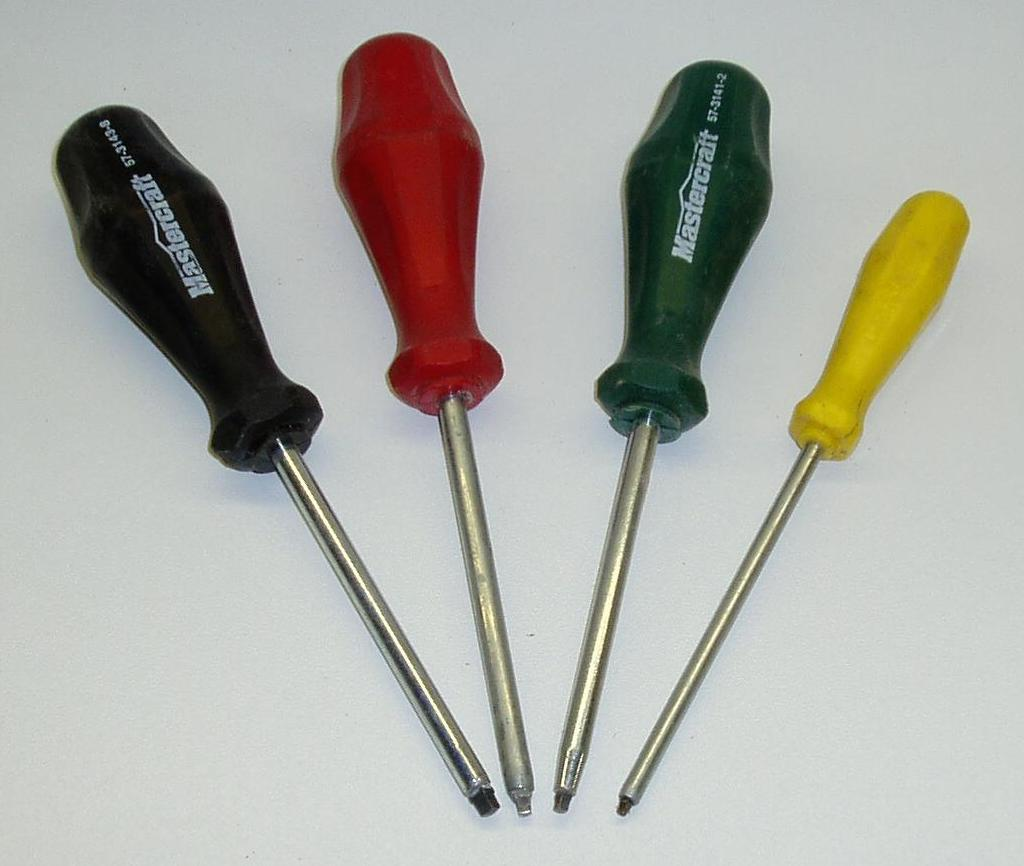
Mastercraft-branded Robertson screwdriver. Certain brands in Canada are branded exclusively for Canadian Tire.

Canadian Tire owns a number of house brands. Some of its most prominent brands include Mastercraft (tools), MotoMaster (automotive), as well as NOMA (household goods, particularly lights and Christmas lights) and Simoniz (car care products)—two brands for which Canadian Tire acquired the Canadian trademark rights.

In the 2010s, Canadian Tire began to expand its array of private labels in order to better compete with online retailers such as Amazon. In 2013, Canadian Tire launched Frank, a budget brand oriented towards household goods and grocery; the brand is known for packaging containing product-specific taglines involving its eponymous mascot—such as "Frank talks trash" (garbage bags), "Frank knows all aboot maple" (maple-flavoured coffee) and "Frank doesn't scrub you the wrong way" (dish sponges)—which became a viral trend in 2020.

Canadian Tire owns the rights to three ice hockey equipment brands. In 2011, the company's purchase of the Forzani Group gave it the rights to the Hespeler and Victoriaville brands. In 2018, it acquired the trademarks of Sherwood Hockey.

On May 10, 2017, Canadian Tire announced it would buy Padinox, the manufacturer of the Paderno kitchen equipment.

== Operations ==
At the end of 2018, Canadian Tire employed 12,735 full-time and 17,951 part-time employees in the corporate structure. These figures do not include temporary employees or employees working for Associate Stores, petroleum stores or franchise stores. There is an in-house Canadian Tire University (CTU) for employee and Associate Store management training.

=== Financial services ===
Canadian Tire Bank (CTB) is the company's retail deposit-taking and credit card issuing arm. They are held indirectly under the Canadian Tire Services, Limited holding company, Canadian Tire Bank, a bank under Canada's Bank Act since 2003. Before 2003, all financing occurred under Canadian Tire Financial Services. In 2014, The Bank of Nova Scotia acquired a 20% economic and voting interest in Canadian Tire Bank, with an option to acquire up to an additional 30% of the company within ten years (or require Canadian Tire to buy back its existing 20% interest) at the then fair market value of the business for $500 million CAD in cash.

Ostensibly in tandem with Scotiabank's acquisition of a minority position in Canadian Tire Bank, Canadian Tire renamed its intermediary holding company Canadian Tire Financial Services Limited as Canadian Tire Services, Limited, effective January 1, 2015, dropping the moniker "Canadian Tire Financial Services" from use. Around 2018, Canadian Tire rebranded its credit card-issuing online banking website as Canadian Tire Bank, removing the last vestige of "Canadian Tire Financial Services" from active use.

=== Petroleum ===
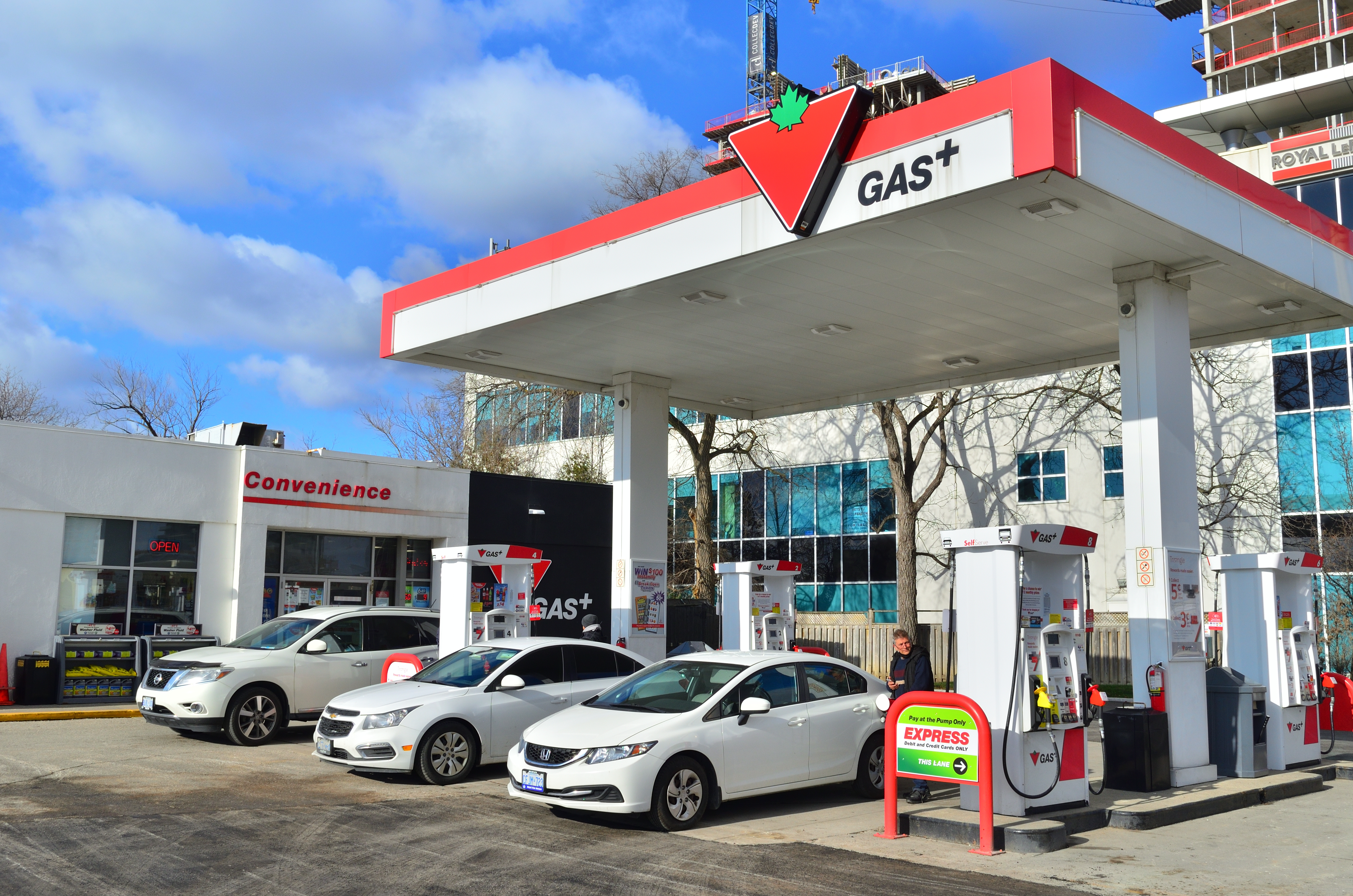
A Canadian Tire Gas+ station at Richmond Hill, Ontario

Canadian Tire Petroleum (CTP), operating as Canadian Tire Gas+, is the division of Canadian Tire which operates gas stations and car washes. CTP was founded in 1958 as a means of increasing customer traffic to Canadian Tire stores. In Ontario, CTP also operates Pit Stop, which provides services like oil changes and rust checks. The Canadian Tire money loyalty program was originally launched through the gas bars as "Gas Bonus Coupons." CTP has opened three Q Stop stores featuring a mini-grocery store and other items.

CTP also holds the concession to operate the 24-hour gas stations at ONroute service centres in Ontario along Highway 401 and parts of Highway 400.

In May 2023, Canadian Tire announced an agreement with Suncor Energy, under which all Canadian Tire Gas+ locations will be converted to Petro-Canada franchises, and the company's Petro-Points rewards program will be integrated with Canadian Tire's Triangle program. The first converted location opened in July 2024 in Kitchener, Ontario.

=== Retail ===
Moody's observed Canadian Tire's unique position in Canadian retail as being "often both misunderstood and underestimated" and "completely foreign" in comparison to U.S. retail, citing its variety of products (ranging from auto parts to sporting goods to outdoors products and grocery at some locations) and that "its proprietary 'currency,' Canadian Tire money, which is a by-product of its loyalty program, has been accepted across Canada by multiple retailers and could almost be described as a 'sub-fiat' currency."

In November 2000, Canadian Tire introduced an online retail operation. On January 1, 2009, citing lack of consumer interest in online shopping compared to its physical stores, the Company discontinued online sales. On November 1, 2013, Canadian Tire returned to online shopping with delivery to stores.

Canadian Tire retail stores

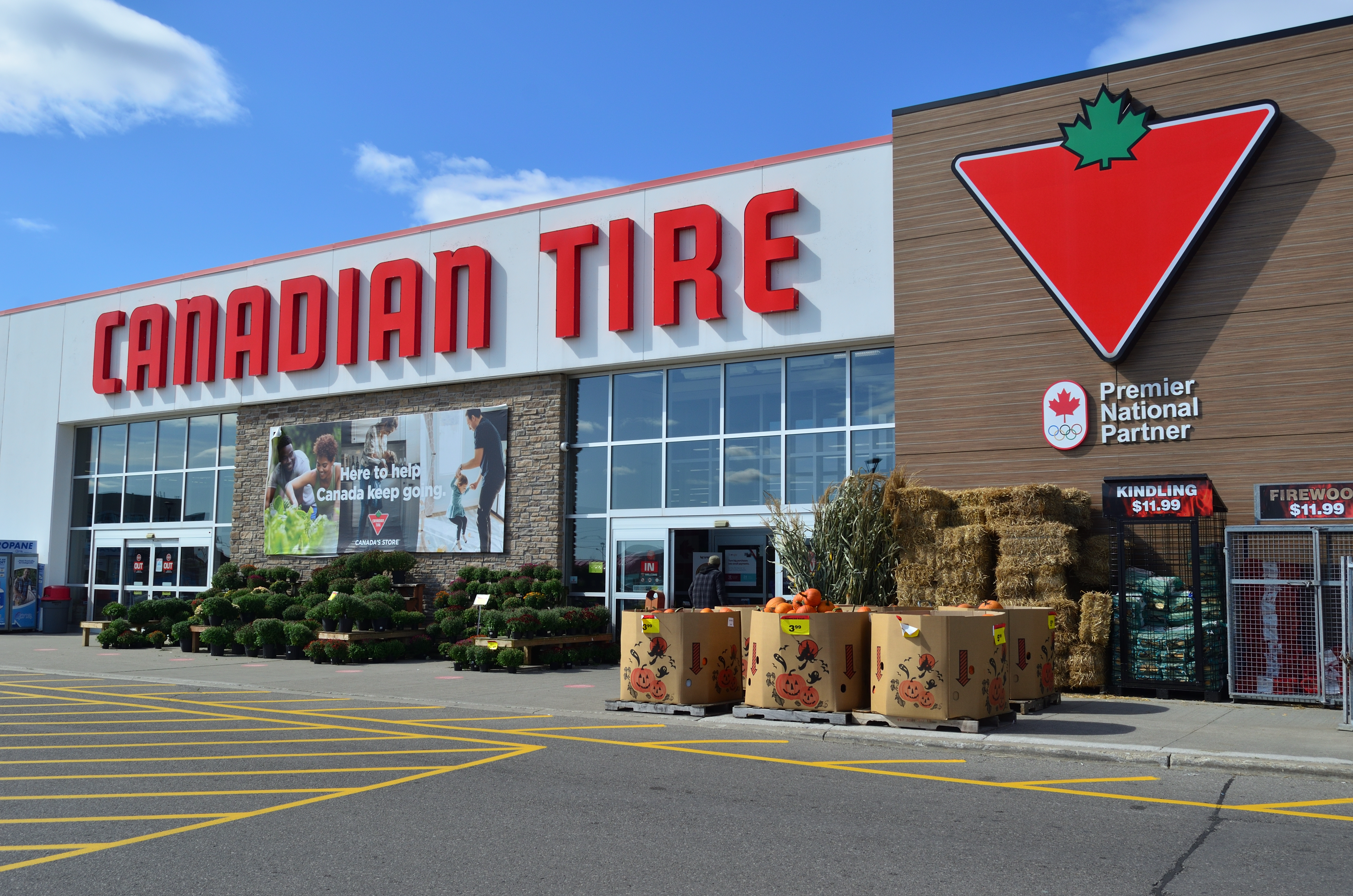
Exterior facade of a Canadian Tire store in Richmond Hill, Ontario

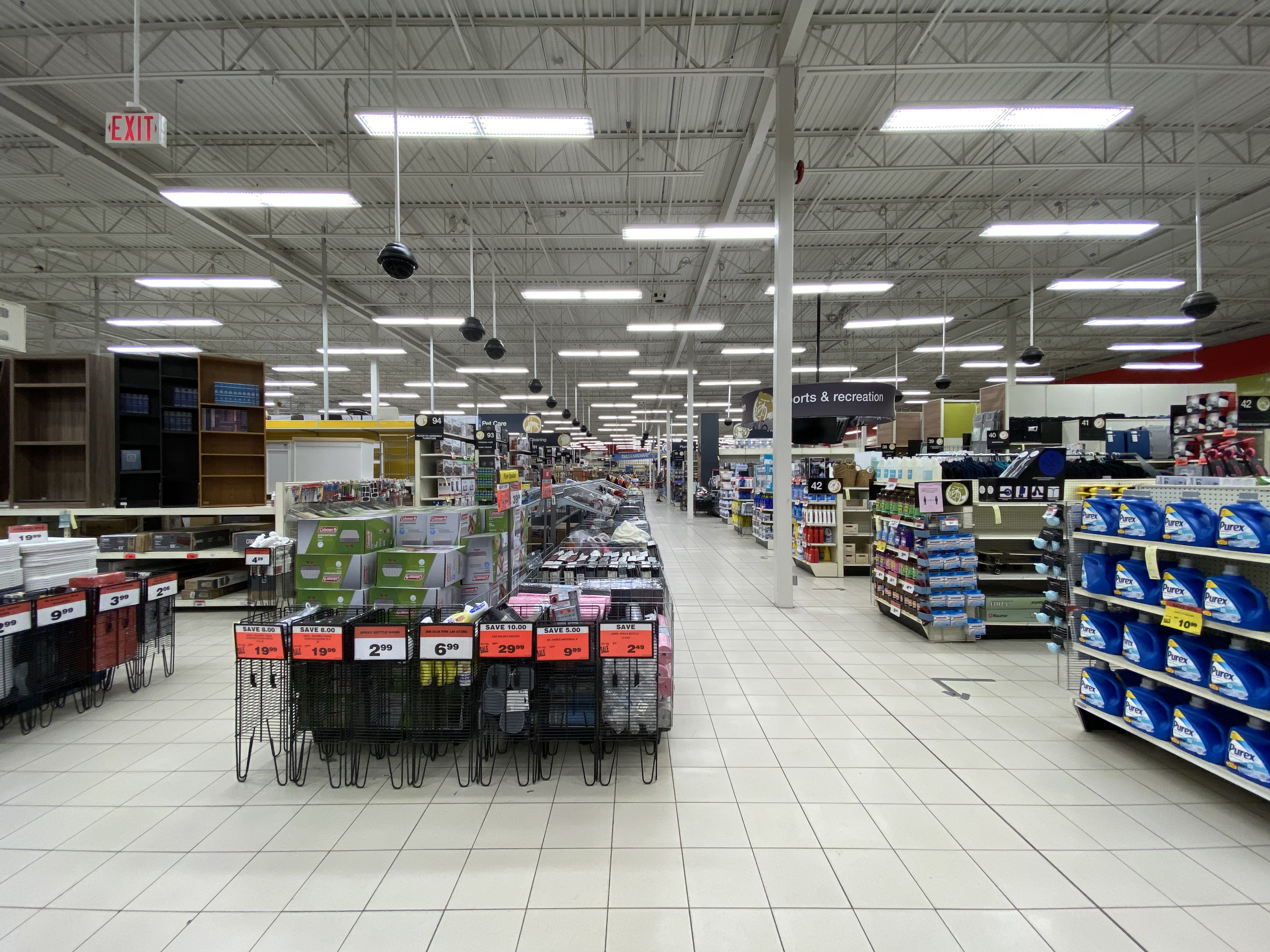
Interior of a Canadian Tire Store in Brampton

In 2009, Canadian Tire introduced a new "Smart store" concept featuring "boutiques" that prominently showcased products within the chain's core product categories. Popular product categories such as auto parts and home goods were moved towards the front of the store to improve their prominence, and some locations began to sell common groceries as a pilot project.

With the demise of Target's businesses in Canada in 2015, Canadian Tire acquired the leases of 12 former Target store locations.

In June 2015, Canadian Tire opened its largest location to-date at South Edmonton Common, which features 130,000 sq ft (12,000 m^{2}) of retail space on two floors, widened and expanded departments, various interactive experiences (including a driving simulator and virtual reality), as well as a rotating exhibit of Hockey Canada memorabilia.

In September 2022, Canadian Tire opened a 135,000 sq ft (12,500 m^{2}) flagship location at Carlingwood Mall in Ottawa to mark the company's centennial; it introduces a large-scale concept called "Remarkable Retail," which carries a modernized design and focuses on enhancing its auto centres, seasonal departments, and its omnichannel retail strategy (including integration of its e-commerce, delivery, and pickup services). The concept was also used for a new location in Welland, Ontario and will be used for a future Calgary location. That year, the company also committed $1.2 billion to renovate 225 stores with its "Concept Connect" format, which features similar enhancements. The following month, Canadian Tire also opened its largest location to-date in Chilliwack, British Columbia at the Cottonwood Centre; occupying a former Sears, it has 170,000 sq ft (16,000 m^{2}) of retail space.

==== Automotive parts ====
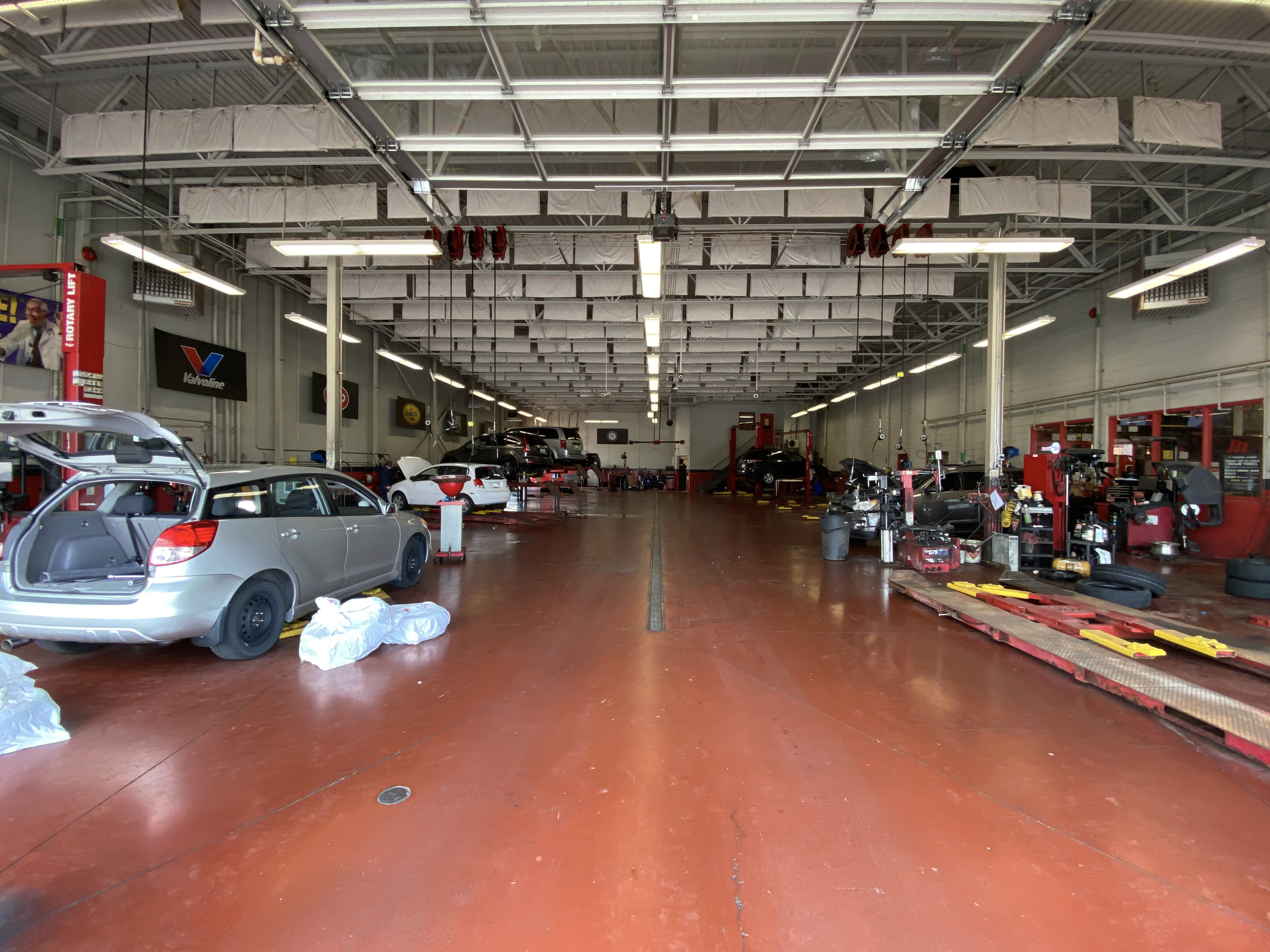
The Canadian Tire automotive service garage at Shoppers World Brampton

In addition to the Canadian Tire stores' Parts department, CTC owns PartSource, an automotive parts and accessories specialty chain which has 91 stores across Nova Scotia, Ontario, Manitoba, Saskatchewan, and Alberta. It serves commercial automotive installers and do-it-yourself mechanics. Before November 2013, some stores were owned and operated by franchisees; all currently belong to Canadian Tire.

==== Clothing ====
In 2001, Canadian Tire acquired Mark's Work Wearhouse (now branded as Mark's), a retailer of business casual and work wear, for $116 million. Along with standalone stores, some Canadian Tire locations feature integrated Mark's locations. Due to space constraints, some smaller Canadian Tire locations removed their Mark's department when remodelled into the "Smart store" format .

In May 2018, the Ontario Teachers' Pension Plan sold the Norwegian sportswear retailer Helly Hansen to Canadian Tire for $985 million.

==== Sporting goods ====
In May 2011, Canadian Tire announced the purchase of Forzani Group, a Canadian sporting goods retailer that operates various brands, including SportChek, Atmosphere, Intersport, Hockey Experts, National Sports, Nevada Bob's Golf, S3, Sport Mart, Sports Experts, Tech Shop, Pro Hockey Life, and The Fitness Source. In February 2021, Canadian Tire announced the closure of all National Sports stores, citing a focus on efficiencies and core assets.

==== Party City ====
In October 2019, Canadian Tire finalized its acquisition of Party City's Canadian business. As part of the deal, CTC signed a 10-year supply agreement with Party City's parent company Amscan.

== Marketing ==
=== Advertisements ===
Historically, Canadian Tire's Christmas ads featured Santa Claus and Ebenezer Scrooge arguing about whether Canadian Tire's selection or their sales prices were the reason to do Christmas shopping there, involving the marketing slogan "Give like Santa, save like Scrooge".

A stamp was issued by Canada Post commemorating Canadian Tire's 75th anniversary. It is based on the Canadian Tire advertisement showing a boy (Bike Story) receiving his first bicycle, which his father purchased at a Canadian Tire retail store.

Starting in 2007, the company ran month-long advent calendar promotions, offering free CDs and discounts throughout the holiday season.

From 1997 to 2005, the company's ads featured the "Canadian Tire couple". The male role, also known as the Canadian Tire guy, was played by Canadian actor Ted Simonett, and Gloria Slade played the female role. They usually showcase a new product to one of their neighbours who needs a specific tool. The "Canadian Tire Couple" was featured on Royal Canadian Air Farce as one of their targets of the year, as "Canada's most annoying couple." They also made a feature guest appearance on Royal Canadian Air Farce as actors in a skit.

In early 2006, ads featuring the couple were phased out and replaced by a new campaign featuring overhead signs found in Canadian Tire's store aisles.

In 2013, Canadian Tire produced a commercial promoting its MasterCraft Eliminator Ultra car battery, and its ability to function in extreme cold, which featured a stripped GMC Sierra pickup truck with its body re-created as an ice sculpture. The ad premiered during the 2014 NHL Winter Classic.

In March 2015, Canadian Tire launched a new ongoing marketing campaign, "Tested for Life in Canada". The campaign, which includes television advertising and in-store labels, showcases products that have been vetted based on input by a consumer focus group recruited by the chain and their reviews of the products. The program also collects feedback that is used to help improve products marketed by Canadian Tire.

=== Sports sponsorships ===
==== Motorsport ====
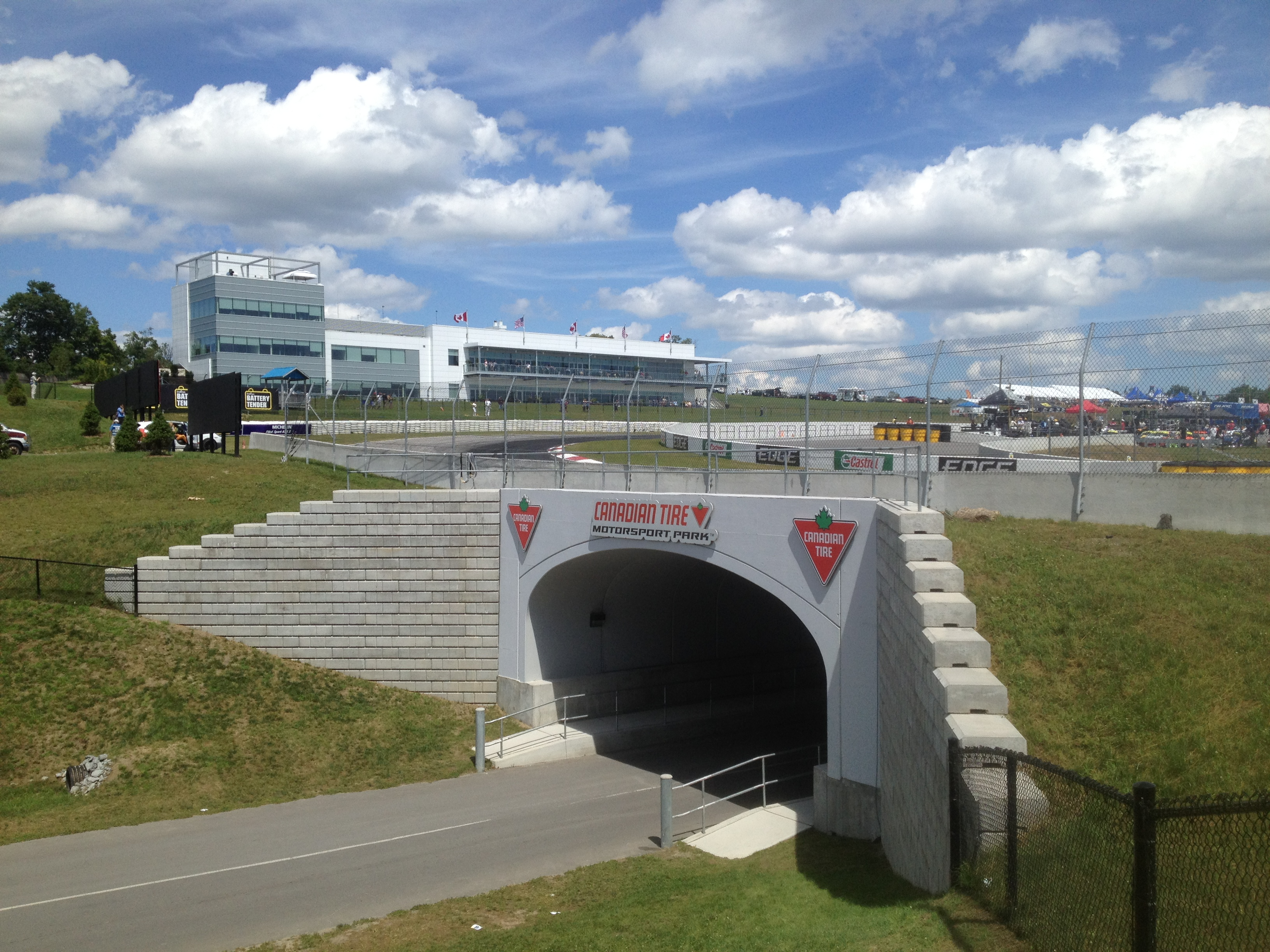
A tunnel with Canadian Tire signage at Canadian Tire Motorsport Park, where the company has naming rights

During the 1980s, the company sponsored an IndyCar racing team. Alfred J. Billes's son David Billes was a Canadian Corvette racer before opening Performance Engineering Ltd. He was later Jacques Villeneuve Sr.'s car owner in CART IndyCar competition in the early 1980s and entered two cars in the 1985 Indianapolis 500. In 1985, Jacques Villeneuve Sr. won the race at Road America.

David Billes was inducted into the Canadian Motorsport Hall of Fame in 1994.

#	Season	Date	Sanction	Track/race	No.	Winning driver	Chassis	Engine	Tire	Grid	Laps led
1	1985	August 4	CART	Road America (R)	76	(Canada) Jacques Villeneuve Sr.	March 85C	Cosworth DFX V8 t	Goodyear	4	14

The company has had naming rights at Canadian Tire Motorsport Park, formerly known as Mosport International Raceway, since 2012.

==== Other sports ====
The home arena of the Ottawa Senators of the National Hockey League (NHL) has been known as the Canadian Tire Centre since 2013.

The company sponsors the Northern Super League, which is planned to be Canada's top division of women's soccer.

== Leadership ==
=== President ===
1. John William Billes, 1927–1956
2. Alfred Jackson Billes, 1956–1966
3. Joseph Dean Muncaster, 1966–1985
4. Dean G. Groussman, 1986–1992
5. Stephen Eugene Bachand, 1993–2000
6. Wayne Carlyle Sales, 2000–2006
7. Thomas Kenneth Gauld, 2006–2008
8. Stephen Gerald Wetmore, 2009–2014
9. Michael Bennett Medline, 2014–2016
10. Stephen Gerald Wetmore, 2016–2020
11. Gregory Hubert Hicks, 2020–present

=== Chairman of the board ===
1. Alex Ethelred Barron, 1966–1984
2. Hugh Leopold Macaulay, 1984–1994
3. Herbert Earl Joudrie, 1994–1996
4. Gilbert Stuart Bennett, 1996–2007
5. Maureen Joanne Sabia, 2007–2022
6. J. Michael Owens, 2022–present

== See also ==
- List of Canadian department stores
- NASCAR Canadian Tire Series
- Crappytire.com
