= Victoriaville (ice hockey) =

Canadian ice hockey brand

- Product type: Ice hockey equipment
- Current owner: Canadian Tire
- Country: Canada
- Introduced: 1945

Victoriaville is a Canadian brand of ice hockey equipment owned by the Canadian Tire Corporation via its subsidiary INA International. The brand was created in Victoriaville, Quebec in 1945 by Henri Mailhot, who formed the company Mailhot & Frères, Inc. In 1952, Mailhot handed down the business to his sons, who ran it for the next two decades. During the 1960s, Victoriaville was the preeminent hockey stick in the National Hockey League and had approximately a 65 per cent share of the hockey stick market. In 1971, the Mailhot brothers sold the business to the Kendall Company of Massachusetts, which a year later was acquired by Colgate-Palmolive. The Victoriaville company became independent once again in 1981 when it was bought by Victor Farr. After a fire at the factory in 1987, Farr sold the business. The Victoriaville name went through multiple ownership changes, until it was acquired by the Forzani Group through its subsidiary INA in 2003. Forzani was taken over by Canadian Tire in 2011, who has owned the brand since. Canadian Tire manufactures Victoriaville equipment alongside its other brands, Sher-Wood and Hespeler.

== History ==
=== Mailhot family era, 1945–1971 ===
The Victoriaville brand of hockey stick was created in 1945 by Henri Mailhot (1900–1976), who formed the company Mailhot & Frères, Inc. In 1952, Henri's business was taken over by four of his sons, Gérard (1924–2010), Bertrand (1927–1994), Léo-Paul (1929–2014), and Raymond (1931–2010). Henri's youngest son, Gilles (1935–1980), was the only one not to join the business. The Mailhot brothers trademarked a fibreglass blade for their sticks, which was a major development in the history of the hockey stick. In 1957, Léo-Paul Drolet, the owner of Sher-Wood, took the Mailhots to court over the patent, claiming he had manufactured fibreglass blades two years before the patent was filed. Drolet won the case.

In the 1950s, CCM and Northland sticks dominated the NHL. In the 1960s, Victoriaville was one of the first companies to break the duopoly, thanks in large part to Jean-Beliveau of the Montreal Canadiens, who had grown up in Victoriaville. Beliveau said, "I had gone to school with the Mailhot brothers, who started Victoriaville. One day in the '60s they came to practice with a few sticks, and I tried them. Some of the blades went flying all over the place. So they went back and worked on it and came up with a very good stick. After that, I played with them to the end of my career." By the end of the decade, Victoriaville counted Bobby Orr, Bobby Hull, Rod Gilbert, Larry Robinson, and Frank Mahovlich among its users. At some point in the late 1960s, Mailhot & Frères changed its name to Victoriaville Hockey Sticks Limited.

=== Ownership changes, 1971–2003 ===
In January 1971, Victoriaville Hockey Sticks was acquired by the Kendall Company. Asked why the brothers chose to sell the company, president Gérard responded, "c'est un hasard qui nous a mis en présence de cette compagnie-là" ["it was a coincidence that put us into contact with this company"], and stated that no one else had tried to buy Victoriaville. Kendall had been founded in Walpole, Massachusetts in 1903 by Henry P. Kendall as a textile company, but had grown to become a major medical supplies company. Upon acquiring the hockey company, Kendall created a new sports division that comprised Victoriaville, Bike, and Nelson Knitting. In 1972, Kendall was acquired by Colgate-Palmolive and became a wholly owned subsidiary. In 1976, Colgate-Palmolive amalgamated Victoriaville Hockey Sticks Limited, Kendall Company (Canada) Limited, Sterno of Canada Limited, Helena Rubinstein Limited, Lakeside Laboratories (Canada) Limited, Colgate-Palmolive Limited, John A. Huston Company Limited, and Caledonia Customs Brokers Limited into a single company called CKR Inc. At this time, Victoriaville Hockey Sticks became a division of CKR.

In 1981, Victor Alfred Farr (1940–2022) purchased the Victoriaville hockey division from CKR and incorporated its operations as Victoriaville Hockey Sticks (Canada) Inc. During his ownership, Farr introduced the "Vic" brand to go with the existing "Victoriaville" name. In January 1987, a fire engulfed the Victoriaville plant, causing around $3 million of damage. After the fire, the Victoriaville hockey operations were taken over by Les Equipment Sportifs Davtec Inc., which operated a factory in Daveluyville.

At an unknown date, Davtec was acquired by the USA Skate Company, Inc. of Long Island, New York. In January 1996, USA Skate was acquired by California Pro Sports of Greenville, South Carolina. The company had been founded in January 1993 to acquire the California Pro line of inline skates, and in August 1994 it added the Kemper line of snowboards.

In September 1997, California Pro Sports sold its USA Skate Company operations to Rawlings for $16.8 million, which included $14.5 million in cash and $2.3 million in liabilities. The sale gave Rawlings the rights to the Victoriaville, Vic, and McMartin brand names. In May 2001, Rawlings sold its hockey operations to VP Sports, Inc. a portfolio company of Equitex, Inc. of Englewood, Colorado. Victoriaville was the third Quebec sporting goods company VP Sports acquired; in August 1999 it purchased the Victoria Precision bicycle company, and in March 2000 it acquired the Torpedo toboggan company. To acquire the Victoriaville hockey assets and trademarks from Rawlings, VP Sports created a new Quebec corporation, the Vic Hockey Company, Inc.

=== Forzani and Canadian Tire ownership, 2003– ===
In September 2003, the Forzani Group Limited of Calgary, Alberta acquired the Victoriaville brand through its subsidiary Intersport North America. Then, in December 2004, Forzani acquired the Hespeler brand, giving it the rights to two historic Canadian hockey names. In 2009, Intersport was merged with two other Forzani companies to create INA International, which remains the owner of the Victoriaville and Vic trademarks. The Canadian Tire Corporation purchased the Forzani Group in May 2011 for $770 million. After the purchase, Forzani was renamed FGL Sports. Canadian Tire continues to produce Victoriaville-branded equipment alongside its Sher-Wood and Hespeler brands.
