= Crappytire.com =

Website of a Canadian company

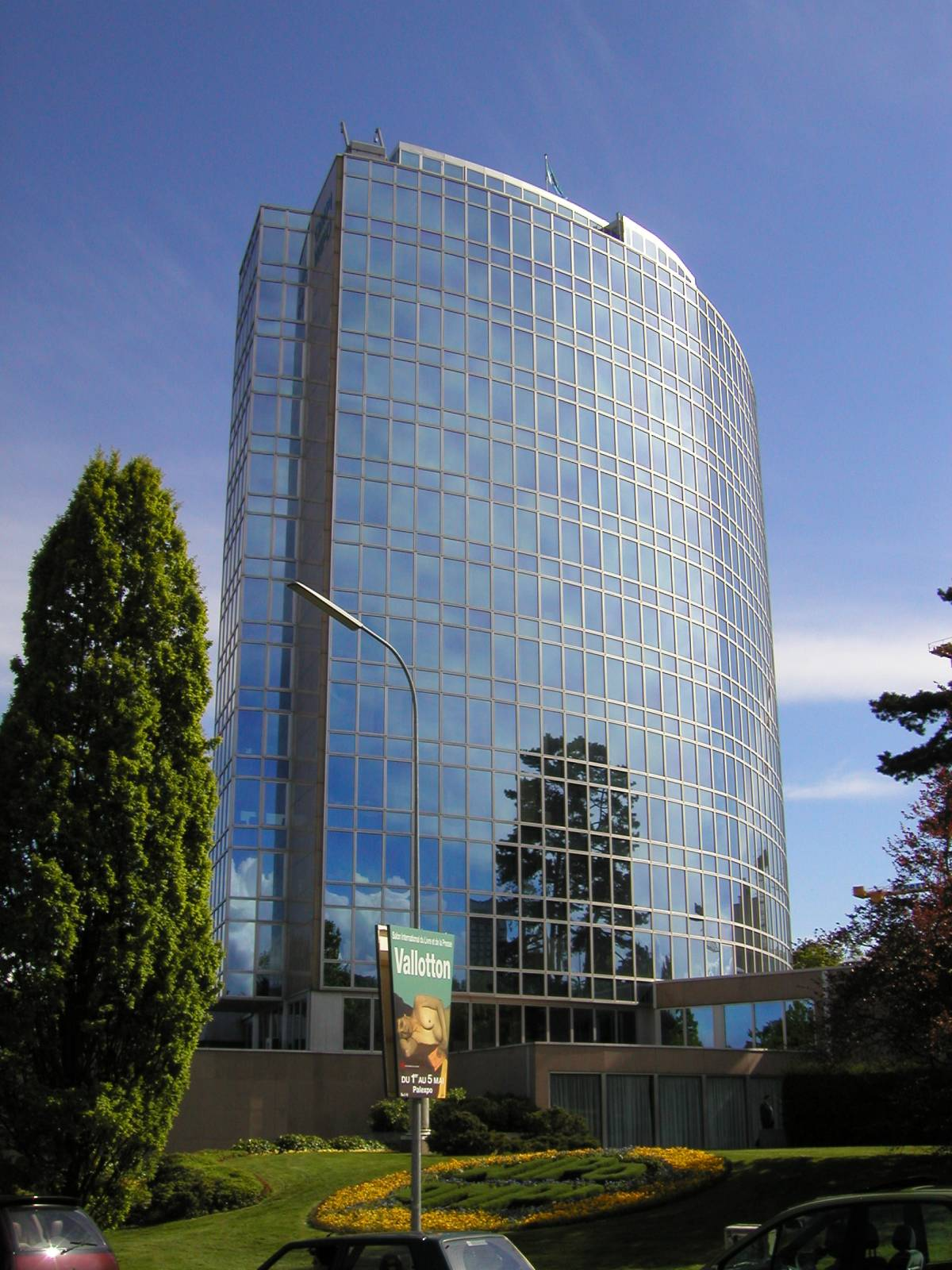
World Intellectual Property Organization headquarters in Geneva, Switzerland

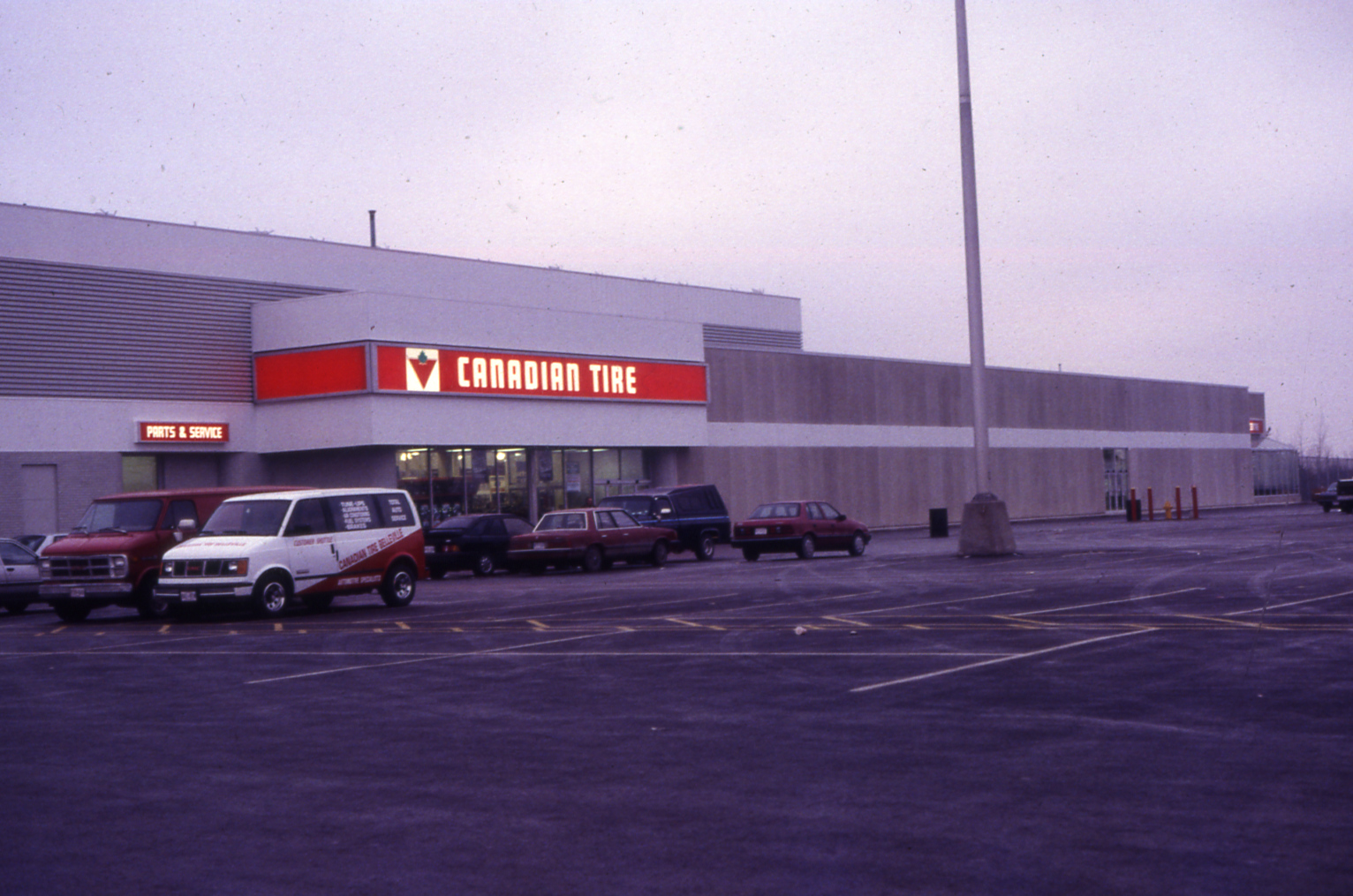
A Canadian Tire store in Belleville, Ontario, in 1994

Crappytire.com was a website and domain name at the centre of a 2001 spat between Canadian retailer Canadian Tire and London, Ontario, resident and website owner Mick McFadden. Canadian Tire, which alleged that McFadden was cybersquatting as the public had associated "Crappy Tire" with its trademark name, took the case to the World Intellectual Property Organization (WIPO). By June 2001, the WIPO decided against Canadian Tire, stating that the company did not own the rights to the "Crappy Tire" expression. In 2002, Canadian Tire purchased the Crappytire.com domain, along with Crappytire.net and Crappytire.ca.

== Background ==
=== Dispute framework ===
Cybersquatting is deliberate, bad-faith registration of a domain name in violation of trademark rights. Since 1999, the World Intellectual Property Organization has been responsible for providing a framework for trademark holders to claim a squatted site. Trademark owners frequently bring their cases to the WIPO for dispute resolution; by 2007, 84% of claims made since 1999 were decided in the complainants' favour.

=== Context ===
Canadian Tire is a Canadian retailer that opened its first store in Hamilton, Ontario in 1934. In 2001, it opened its online e-commerce website, and by that same year, its net earnings had reached C$176.7 million, had 450 stores, and its financial arm had issued over 400,000 credit cards.

Mick McFadden is an automotive mechanic, who until 2000, operated Crappytire.com as a website protesting Canadian Tire by comparing its prices to that of its rivals. That same year, Canadian Tire threatened to sue McFadden unless the website was taken down and the domain was handed over; though he took the website down, McFadden refused to hand over the domain. Canadian Tire went to the WIPO.

== Dispute ==
"Canadian Tire is frequently colloquially referred to or known as "Crappy Tire" by the public."

— Canadian Tire in its WIPO filing

"Since when is 'Canadian' interchangeable with 'crappy'?"

— Mick McFadden in his WIPO defense

=== Canadian Tire arbitrates ===
In its submission to the WIPO, Canadian Tire stated that the Crappytire.com domain name was "identical or confusingly similar" to its registered trademarks, and further alleged that the Canadian Tire brand had become so famous and well known that no one would use "Crappy Tire" other than to suggest affiliation with Canadian Tire.

McFadden, in his response, noted that while Canadian Tire owned many trademarks, they had neglected to register or use "Crappy Tire", though he declined to dispute that Canadian Tire was colloquially known as "Crappy Tire".

The WIPO dismissed Canadian Tire's complaint, not having found Canadian Tire to have met the burden of proof.
