= Hespeler Hockey =

Canadian brand of ice hockey equipment

Hespeler
- Product type: Ice hockey equipment
- Current owner: Canadian Tire Corporation
- Country: Canada
- Introduced: 1921
- Website: Archived official website at the Wayback Machine (archived 2002-01-25)

Hespeler is a Canadian brand of ice hockey equipment owned by the Canadian Tire Corporation through its subsidiary FGL Sports (formerly the Forzani Group Limited). The Hespeler brand originated in the Hespeler Wood Specialty Company in Hespeler, Ontario, which was founded in 1921 and produced hockey sticks. In the 1930s Hespeler was merged with a number of other manufacturing companies to form the Hespeler-St. Mary's Wood Specialty Company, which continued to manufacture hockey sticks at the Hespeler factory.

In 1972, Hespeler-St. Mary's was purchased by Cooper Canada, who discontinued the Hespeler line and used the factory to produce its own sticks and bats. Subsequent owners of the Hespeler factory included Charan Industries, Canstar Industries, Nike, and Roustan Hockey. Hockey stick manufacturing in Hespeler ended in 2021, when Roustan transferred its operations to Brantford.

In 1987, businessman Steve Davies discovered that the Hespeler brand had never been trademarked. Davies acquired the trademark and formed the company Hespeler Hockey Inc., which revived the brand. In 1997 Davies sold the company, and that year, Wayne Gretzky became an officer, director, and part-owner. Hespeler went through several ownership changes after 1997 until it was purchased in 2004 by the Forzani Group Limited. In 2011, Canadian Tire purchased the Forzani Group, giving it the rights to the Hespeler name. Since 2011, the Hespeler brand has been used sporadically by Canadian Tire alongside its other hockey brands, Sher-Wood and Victoriaville.

== History through the Hespeler factory ==
=== Hespeler Wood Specialty Company, 1921–1930 ===
The Hespeler brand was created by Zachariah Adam Hall (1865–1952), who in 1921 started the Hespeler Wood Specialty Company in Hespeler, Ontario. The name itself came from Jacob Hespeler (1810–1881), a settler from Württemberg. Hespeler Wood Specialty operated out of a factory at 63 Sheffield Street that Hall and his partner Oscar Zyrd owned. The facilities had belonged previously to the Parkin Elevator Co. Ltd. and Dominion Heating and Ventilating Co., two companies that Hall and Zyrd had purchased. Among the earliest brands of stick the company produced were "Mic Mac" and "Red Flash." It is uncertain when the first "Hespeler" stick appeared.

=== Waterloo Wood Products/Hespeler-St. Mary's Wood Specialty, 1930–1972 ===
On 3 November 1930, the Canada Barrels and Kegs Company Limited incorporated a new subsidiary called Waterloo Wood Products Limited. The company was intended to act as a new hockey stick manufacturing division. Canada Barrels had been founded in Waterloo, Ontario in 1872 as Mueller Cooperage. In 1914 the name was changed to Charles Mueller Cooperage, and when the company was sold in 1920 to Joseph E. Seagram and Sons Ltd., the name was changed to Canada Barrels and Kegs. In 1928, all of the Seagram interests were acquired by Samuel Bronfman of Montreal.

After the establishment of Waterloo Wood Products, the new company went on an acquisition spree and purchased the majority of Canada's hockey stick manufacturers. All of the companies it acquired were from Southwestern Ontario except for McNiece & Orchard, which was from Montreal. Between 1930 and 1934, the five businesses Waterloo Wood Products acquired were:

- 1930: Hespeler Wood Specialty (est. 1921)
- 1930: St. Mary's Wood Specialty (est. 1908)
- 1931: The Hilborn Company (est. 1847)
- 1932: McNiece & Orchard (est. 1890)
- 1934: E. B. Saleyards & Sons (est. 1887)

Waterloo Wood Products consolidated the operations of all five companies in the former Hespeler Wood Specialty factory in Hespeler. Then, on 7 January 1935, Waterloo Wood changed its name to the Hespeler-St. Mary's Wood Specialty Company Limited. Over the next several decades, the company emerged as a leader in the production of hockey sticks and baseball bats.

=== Cooper, Canstar, Nike, 1972–2004 ===
On 10 July 1971, Samuel Bronfman died in Montreal. In the wake of his death, on 5 July 1972 the Hespeler-St. Mary's business and factory were sold to Cooper Canada. Cooper had been founded in Toronto in 1905 as General Leather Goods. In 1949 the business was renamed Cooper Weeks, and in 1971 became Cooper Canada. After the Cooper purchase in 1972, the Hespeler-St. Mary's factory produced only Cooper branded hockey sticks and baseball bats. In 1986, Cooper baseball bats, all of which were produced in Hespeler, were used for the first time in Major League Baseball, and by 1988 Cooper bats accounted for 30 percent of the market.

On 13 May 1987, Cooper Canada was acquired by Charan Industries of Montreal for $36 million. Then, in early 1990, Charan sold Cooper to Canstar Industries Inc. of Montreal. Canstar already owned the Bauer, Daoust, Micron, Mega, and Lange skate brands, and the Cooper acquisition made it one of the largest players in the hockey equipment market. In December 1994, Nike purchased Canstar for CAD 546 million. Through these acquisitions, the factory in Hespeler continued to manufacture wood sticks.

=== Heritage Wood Specialties/Roustan Hockey, 2004–present ===
In 2004, Nike sought to divest of its wood hockey stick manufacturing operations in Hespeler. That year, five Nike employees joined with investor Mark Fackoury to form Heritage Wood Specialties Inc., which purchased the factory and its equipment. By the late 2010s, the company was struggling financially and its facilities required major upgrades. In 2019, the business was purchased by W. Graeme Roustan, who in 2008 had worked with Kohlberg & Company to acquire all of Nike's hockey assets. Upon acquiring the company, the new owner changed the name to Roustan Hockey. In 2021, Roustan closed the old Hespeler factory and moved the company's operations to Brantford.

== History through Hespeler Hockey Inc. ==
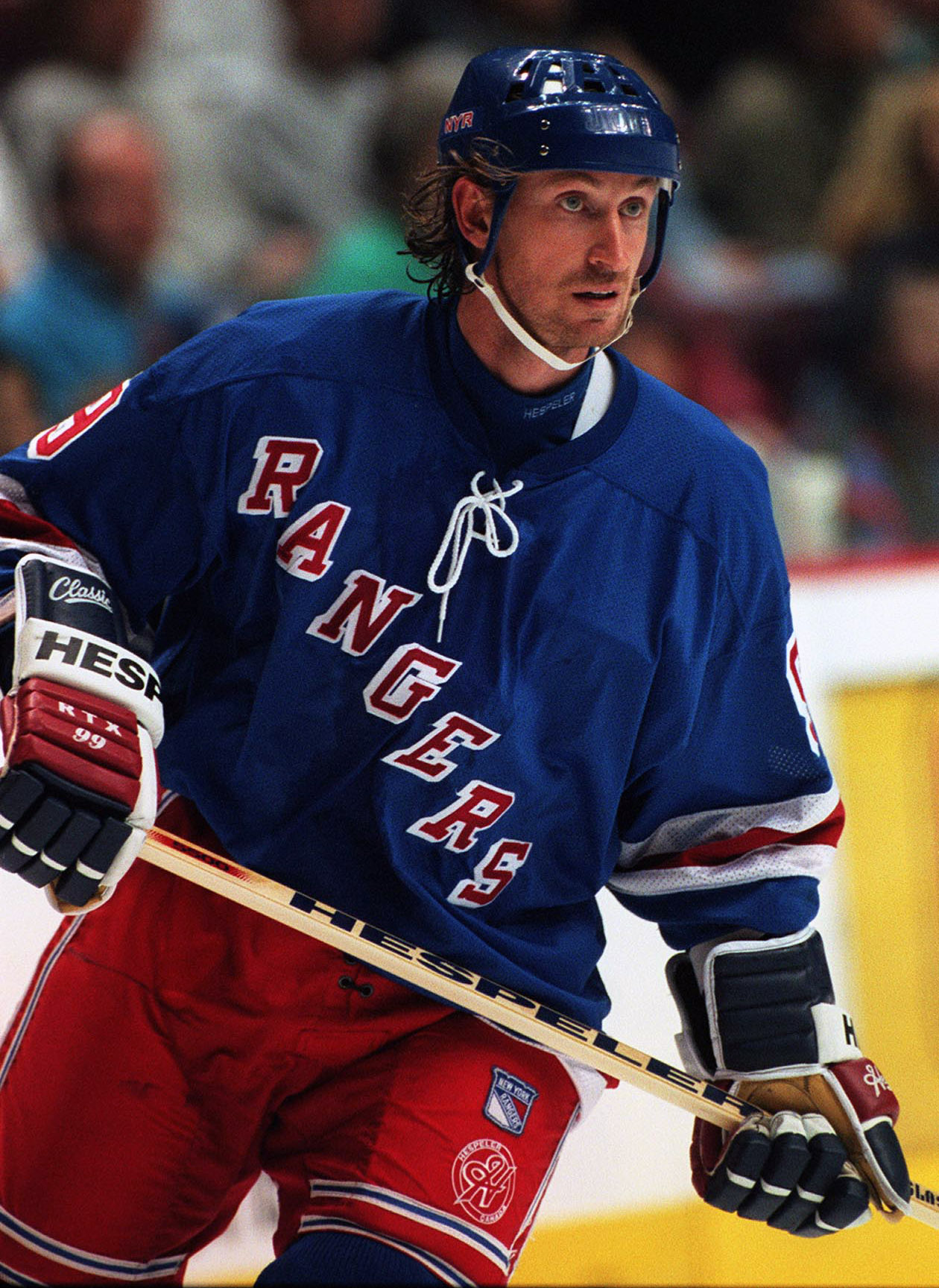
Wayne Gretzky using Hespeler stick, gloves, and pants

In 1987, businessman Steve Davies of Etobicoke, Ontario, discovered that the name "Hespeler" had never been trademarked. When Hespeler Wood Specialty was formed in 1921, Hespeler, Ontario was a town, and therefore the name could not be trademarked. However, in 1973, the Town of Hespeler merged with Galt and Preston to form Cambridge, Ontario, and Hespeler became a neighbourhood. After the creation of Cambridge, the Hespeler name was left untrademarked. Davies acquired the trademark himself and formed the company Hespeler Hockey Inc. After he began selling sticks under the name, Davies was sued by Cooper, who claimed it owned the rights. The lawsuit was dropped in 1990 when Canstar purchased Cooper. The first NHL player to use a new Hespeler stick was Colin Patterson of the Calgary Flames, who played with it in game six of the 1989 Stanley Cup Final. Patterson was a childhood friend of Davies's business partner Eric Niskanen. As Hespeler had not yet paid the NHL brand licensing fee, Patterson was forced to black-out the name. Soon after, Patterson's teammate Doug Gilmour began using a Hespeler stick with a flat blade.

In September 1997, Davies sold Hespeler Hockey to First Team Sports, Inc. of Minneapolis. Since 1990, Wayne Gretzky had worked with First Team as an ambassador for the company's inline skates, and was a major shareholder in the company. A month after the Hespeler purchase, First Team reached an agreement with Gretzky that gave him shares in Hespeler Hockey Inc., and made him an officer and director of the company. Gretzky would also serve as the brand's primary ambassador. The agreement stipulated also that if ever First Team sold Hespeler, Gretzky would retain a 25 per cent stake in Hespeler. From the fall of 1997 until his retirement in April 1999, Gretzky used Hespeler equipment (save for his Jofa helmet) and sticks. In October 2001, Gen-X Sports Inc. of Toronto acquired First Team for $10.4 million.

In July 2001, the Huffy Corporation acquired Gen-X for $19 million in cash plus five million Huffy shares. In October 2004, Huffy filed for Chapter 11 protection and was forced to auction part of its holdings. The Hespeler trademark was purchased by the Forzani Group Limited of Calgary. A year earlier, Forzani acquired Victoriaville Hockey, therefore, the Hespeler purchase allowed the company to expand its hockey holdings. In May 2011, the Canadian Tire Corporation purchased the Forzani Group for $770 million, and then renamed it FGL Sports. Since 2011, Canadian Tire has used the Hespeler brand infrequently, focusing instead on its Sher-Wood and Victoriaville brands.
