= Joseph Dean Muncaster =

Canadian businessman (1933 - 2012)

- Born: 23 October 1933; Sudbury, Ontario
- Died: 13 March 2012 (aged 78); Puerto Vallarta, Mexico
- Education: University of Western Ontario (BA '56); Northwestern University (MBA '57)
- Spouse: Grace Doris Rodwell (m. 1957)

Joseph Dean Muncaster (23 October 1933 – 13 March 2012) was a Canadian businessman. He is best known as a President of Canadian Tire.

== Biography ==
Born in Sudbury, Ontario Muncaster began working at his father's Canadian Tire Associate Store at the age of 12 sweeping floors and stocking shelves. By age 18 he was left in charge for the store for a month while his father was on vacation. Muncaster was president of the student council while attending Sudbury High School in Sudbury, Ontario. He graduated from the University of Western Ontario with a BA with honours in Business Administration and then graduated from the Northwestern University with an MBA. For one of his university courses Muncaster wrote an analysis paper on Canadian Tire that was later sent to AJ Billes (President of Canadian Tire at the time) resulting in his being hired by the corporation immediately after graduation.

In 1960 Muncaster joined the Board of Directors of Canadian Tire. Within a year he left corporate Canadian Tire to return to Sudbury, Ontario to help his father with his Canadian Tire Associate Store. During his tenure back at his father's store Muncaster devised a product numbering system that within a couple of years would be used at all Canadian Tire stores to improve sales analysis and inventory control. After shareholder in-fighting was resolved Muncaster, then aged 33, returned to corporate Canadian Tire as president in 1966.

Muncaster made significant changes to Canadian Tire's management personnel that saw many of his Northwestern University MBA classmates in key positions. His 5-year plan was to move Canadian Tire from a $100-million annual revenue to $1-billion annual revenue. By the end of his 19-year presidency in 1985 revenues had reached $2-billion annually. During the 1970s as a result of his work at Canadian Tire Muncaster sat on numerous boards including CP Hotels, Black & Decker, Sara Lee, Ontario Hydro, and Bell Canada.

He was a member of the Young Presidents' Organization, a global network of chief executives. He a Founding Director of the Robarts Research Institute. Muncaster received an honorary Doctor of Laws from Laurentian University in 1975. After leaving Canadian Tire Muncaster became vice-president of Canadian Corporate Funding(an investment company in Montreal, Quebec). In 1990 with a group of investors Muncaster acquired Bargain Harold's from K-Mart which ended in 1992.

Over his lifetime he had 4 marriages. His first marriage was with Grace Rodwell. His second marriage in 1977 was with Evelyn Bennett. His third marriage was with Brenda Bell. His fourth marriage was with Joan Cameron happened in 1995. Muncaster had three sons: Bob and Bernie with Grace, and David with Brenda. Muncaster died in Puerto Vallarta, Mexico on March 13, 2012, at the 78 years of age. He suffered a pancreatic attack resulting in an aneurysm that caused his hospitalization. A stroke during his hospitalization was fatal.
