= Canadian Tire Financial Services =

Financial services subsidiary of the Canadian Tire retail chain

Canadian Tire Services Ltd.

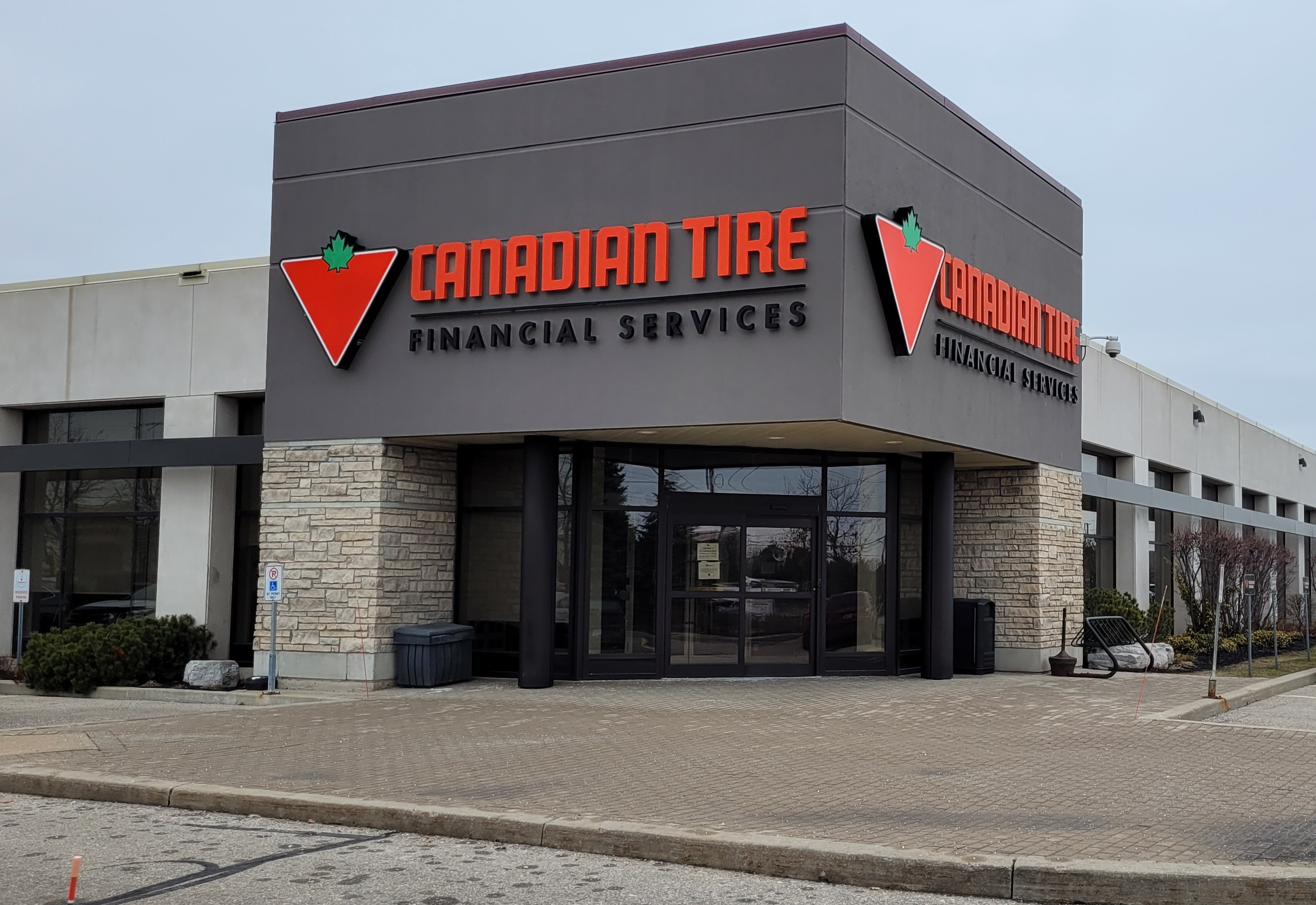
- Canadian Tire Financial Services office in Oakville
- Trade name: Canadian Tire Bank
- Type: Subsidiary
- Industry: Financial services
- Predecessor: Canadian Tire Financial Services (1968–2016)
- Founded: 2003
- Headquarters: Oakville, Ontario
- Products: Triangle Rewards; Canadian Tire money
- Owner: Canadian Tire (100%)
- Number of employees: 1400 full-time equivalent
- Parent: Canadian Tire
- Website: www.ctfs.com

Canadian Tire Services Ltd. (CTSL), doing business as Canadian Tire Bank (French: Banque Canadian Tire), is the financial services subsidiary of the Canadian Tire retail chain. The bank is based in Oakville, Ontario, and has additional business operations in St. Catharines and Welland, Ontario. Between 1968 and 2016 (with some branding continuing until 2018), Canadian Tire Services Ltd. was known as Canadian Tire Financial Services Ltd. (CTFS or CTFSL).

== History ==
In 1968, Canadian Tire purchased Midland Shoppers Credit Limited, a small company founded in 1961 to provide third-party credit processing for local retailers in the Niagara Region. After its acquisition, the company was renamed "Canadian Tire Acceptance Limited (CTAL)", and later "Canadian Tire Financial Services Limited".

Canadian Tire Bank (CTB), a Schedule 1 (domestic, deposit-taking) bank under the Bank Act, was founded in 2003 and took over financial services that had been provided by CTFS. In addition to Mastercard credit card services, Canadian Tire Bank also launched high interest savings accounts, tax-free savings accounts, and GIC products.

In 2014, Scotiabank signed a deal to buy a 20 percent stake in Canadian Tire's financial services business, which includes Canadian Tire Bank, for $500 million in cash as part of a strategic partnership between the two companies under which Scotiabank was also permitted to buy up to an additional 30% (or sell back to Canadian Tire its 20% stake) at the then fair market value within 10 years.

In 2023, Canadian Tire repurchased the 20 percent stake that Scotiabank had owned for $895 million, restoring its ownership to 100%.

== Mastercard ==
In 1995, the bank issued the Canadian Tire Options Mastercard nationally with a reward program for purchases of products from Canadian Tire and, later, launched its Gas Advantage Mastercard product whereby the cardholder earned a tiered discount of 2–10¢ (in Canadian currency) per litre on gasoline purchases from Canadian Tire based on the previous month's gas purchases. In 2008, it embedded the card with Mastercard's PayPass "tap-and-go" technology. These cards are no longer issued by the Canadian Tire Bank; however, the Gas Advantage Mastercard continues to be honoured for discount at Canadian Tire gas stations, and Canadian Tire Bank continues to reissue the card to existing cardholders.

In 2006, the bank began a pilot program of the Cash Advantage Mastercard . Its reward program allowed cardholders to earn up to 1.5% cash back based on the amount of eligible annual purchases made on their card. In 2007, it created the Vacation Advantage Mastercard, with cardholders rewarded with points that could be redeemed for any vacation-related purchase.

In 2009, it issued the Curve Mastercard nationwide, so named for the distinctly curved shape of the lower right-hand corner of the card. It had no annual fee and had a reward program that allowed cardholders to earn up to 3.5% cash back, based on the amount of eligible annual purchases made on their card. Cardholders could earn double cash back at Canadian Tire and Mark's Work Wearhouse stores. (Mark's is a clothing and footwear retailer that has been a subsidiary of Canadian Tire since 2002.) In late 2010, the Vacation Advantage and Curve Mastercards were removed from Canadian Tire's credit portfolio.

On May 1, 2018, the cards were rebranded under the Triangle Rewards name, to match up with Canadian Tire's new customer loyalty program.

On March 11, 2022, Canadian Tire announced that Triangle Mastercard holders would earn 10¢ by using their card on fuel purchases at any gas station across the nation. This period ended June 19, 2022 and the Canadian Tire Triangle Mastercard now earns 5¢ on fuel purchases.

== Insurance ==
CTB markets payment protection insurance underwritten by Assurant, and identity theft insurance offered in a partnership arrangement with Sigma Loyalty Group who, in turn, partners with Intersections, Inc., to underwrite the policies under its Identity Guard product offering. It used to sell term life and travel insurance underwritten by Canada Life, but later stopped marketing those products.

== Retail banking ==
In October 2006, CTB began to offer more traditional banking services over the phone or online. Such offerings included, as of 2019:

- Savings accounts
- Tax-free savings accounts
- Guaranteed investment certificates

The bank used to offer mortgages, but in October 2009, CTB sold its residential real estate secured lending portfolio of approximately 1,000 mortgages valued at approximately $167 million to National Bank of Canada and no longer offers mortgage products.

All deposit products are automatically insured to applicable limits by the federal crown corporation Canada Deposit Insurance Corporation (CDIC).
