= Inglasco =

Canadian hockey puck manufacturer

Inglasco Inc.
- Founded: 11 February 1976
- Headquarters: 2745 rue de la Sherwood, Sherbrooke, Quebec, Canada
- Products: Hockey pucks
- Owner: Gracious Living Corporation
- Website: inglasco.com

Inglasco Inc. is a Canadian manufacturer of hockey pucks that has operated since 1976. Styled originally as InGlasCo, the company was founded in Sherbrooke, Quebec, by Denis S. Drolet (1951–2023), the son of Sherwood Hockey founder Léo Paul Drolet (1919–2001). Inglasco was created as a fibreglass manufacturing company, and then in 1980 expanded into the hockey business. Since 1991, Inglasco has been the official puck supplier of the National Hockey League, although its pucks have been used in the league since the early 1980s. Along with pucks, the company produces water bottles, mini sticks, hockey bags, and novelties.

Between 1994 and 2008, Denis Drolet's holding company, the Groupe Drolet Inc., owned Inglasco and Sherwood-Drolet. After Sherwood-Drolet went bankrupt in 2008, Carpe Diem Growth Capital acquired it and Inglasco. In 2014, the Gracious Living Corporation acquired Sherwood and Inglasco from Carpe Diem. Gracious Living sold Sherwood in 2018, but retained ownership of Inglasco. The company is based in the original Sherwood factory in Sherbrooke.

== History ==
InGlasCo was founded in 1976 by Denis S. Drolet as a die-cut fibreglass company. The name is a portmanteau of "industrial glass fibre components". In 1980, the company entered the hockey puck business. While Inglasco designed and marketed its pucks, it contracted out the manufacturing. Its main contractors were Vegum a.s. in Dolné Vestenice, Slovakia, and Soucy Barron Inc. in Saint-Jérôme, Quebec. The company hired ex-NHL player Sean McKenna as vice-president for sales and marketing.

Prior to 1991–92 NHL season, individual teams were responsible for providing pucks for their home games. As long as its pucks met the league's physical specifications, a team could use any puck it wished. For the 1991–92 season, the league's 75th anniversary, the NHL's manager of retail and licensing, Fred Scalera, decided the league should have an official puck. Scalera polled teams on which puck they wanted, and the overwhelming choice was Inglasco. He said, "it seemed to make a lot of sense on the marketing side to have an official puck. There's an official baseball, an official football and, now, an official puck." Although most teams were already using Inglasco, some had been using Viceroy pucks also.

After a fire at his factory in 1969, in 1970 Léo Drolet sold a majority stake in Sherwood-Drolet to Figgie International of Cleveland. In late 1994, Denis Drolet formed the Groupe Drolet Inc. and reacquired Sherwood-Drolet from Figgie. After the acquisition, Drolet placed Inglasco's operations within the Groupe Drolet as well.

During the 2004–05 NHL lockout, Inglasco laid off around 25 of its 40 employees. However, during the summer of 2005, it was able to rehire all its employees.

In May 2008, the Sherwood-Drolet Corp. filed for bankruptcy, and a month later its assets were acquired by Carpe Diem Growth Capital. That September, the reorganised Sher-Wood company, owned by Carpe Diem, acquired Inglasco. In 2014, the Gracious Living Corporation, a plastic injection furniture manufacturer based in Woodbridge, Ontario, acquired Sherwood and Inglasco from Carpe Diem. In 2018, Gracious Living sold the Sherwood trademarks to the Canadian Tire Corporation while retaining ownership of Inglasco.
