= Muncaster Mountain =

Mountain in Washington (state), United States

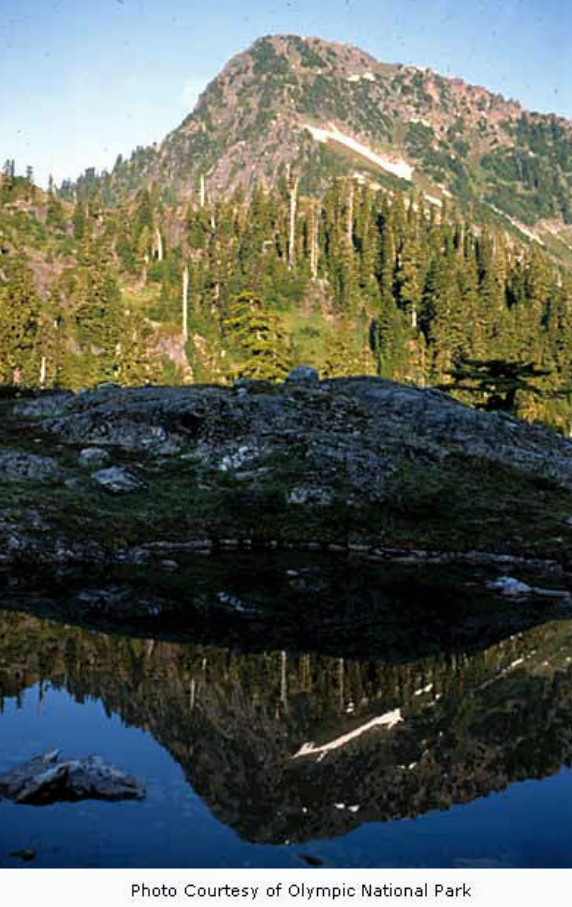

Highest point
- Elevation: 5,910 ft (1,800 m)
- Prominence: 990 ft (300 m)
- Parent peak: June 10th Peak (6,019 ft)
- Isolation: 2.72 mi (4.38 km)
- Coordinates: 47°38′17″N 123°30′44″W

Geography
- Location within Washington (state) Location within the United States
- Country: United States
- State: Washington
- County: Jefferson
- Protected area: Olympic National Park
- Parent range: Olympic Mountains
- Topo map: USGS Mount Christie

Geology
- Rock age: Eocene

Climbing
- First ascent: 1941
- Easiest route: class 3 scrambling via Quinualt River trail

Muncaster Mountain is a 5,910-foot (1,801-metre) mountain summit located within Olympic National Park in Jefferson County of Washington state. It is situated 4.4 mi (7.1 km) south-southeast of Mount Christie, and 14.6 mi (23.5 km) southeast of Mount Olympus. Precipitation runoff from the mountain drains into Rustler Creek, which is a tributary of the Quinault River. Although modest in elevation, relief is significant as the summit rises 4,000 feet above the Rustler Creek valley in one mile.

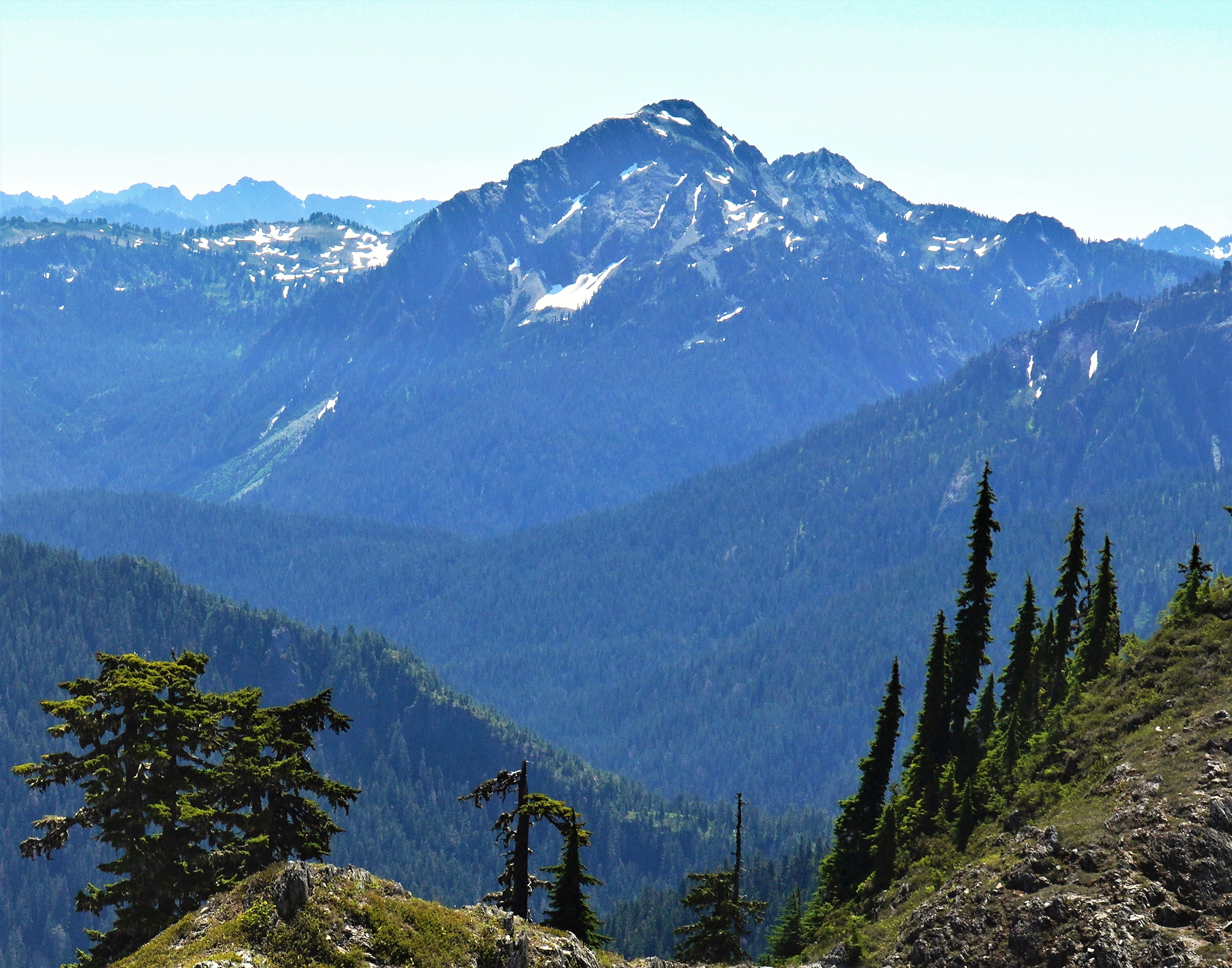
Muncaster Mountain, northwest aspect

== History ==
The 1889–1890 Seattle Press Expedition originally named this geographical feature "Mount DeYoung", for M. H. de Young of the San Francisco Chronicle. The peak was later renamed in honor of U.S. Army Private Roy Muncaster (1892–1918), 6th Battalion, 20th Engineer Regiment; a forest ranger for the Olympic National Forest, who drowned 5 February 1918, when the troop transport SS Tuscania was torpedoed and sunk in World War I. The Muncaster Mountain toponym was officially adopted in 1918 by the U.S. Board on Geographic Names.

The first ascent of this peak was made in 1941 by T. Nelson of the United States Geological Survey.

== Climate ==
Based on the Köppen climate classification, Muncaster Mountain is located in the marine west coast climate zone of western North America. Weather fronts originating in the Pacific Ocean travel northeast toward the Olympic Mountains. As fronts approach, they are forced upward by the peaks (orographic lift), causing them to drop their moisture in the form of rain or snow. As a result, the Olympics experience high precipitation, especially during the winter months in the form of snowfall. Because of maritime influence, snow tends to be wet and heavy, resulting in avalanche danger. During winter months weather is usually cloudy, but due to high pressure systems over the Pacific Ocean that intensify during summer months, there is often little or no cloud cover during the summer. The months July through September offer the most favorable weather for viewing or climbing this peak.

== Geology ==
The Olympic Mountains are composed of obducted clastic wedge material and oceanic crust, primarily Eocene sandstone, turbidite, and basaltic oceanic crust. The mountains were sculpted during the Pleistocene era by erosion and glaciers advancing and retreating multiple times.

== See also ==
- Geology of the Pacific Northwest
