= Home Outfitters =

Canadian retail chain

- Type: Division
- Industry: Retail
- Predecessor: Bed, Bath & More (1998-1999)
- Founded: 1999; 27 years ago
- Defunct: July 31, 2019; 7 years ago
- Fate: Closed by parent
- Headquarters: Brampton, Ontario, Canada
- Number of locations: 69 (2014)
- Area served: Canada
- Products: Home furnishings
- Parent: Hudson's Bay Company

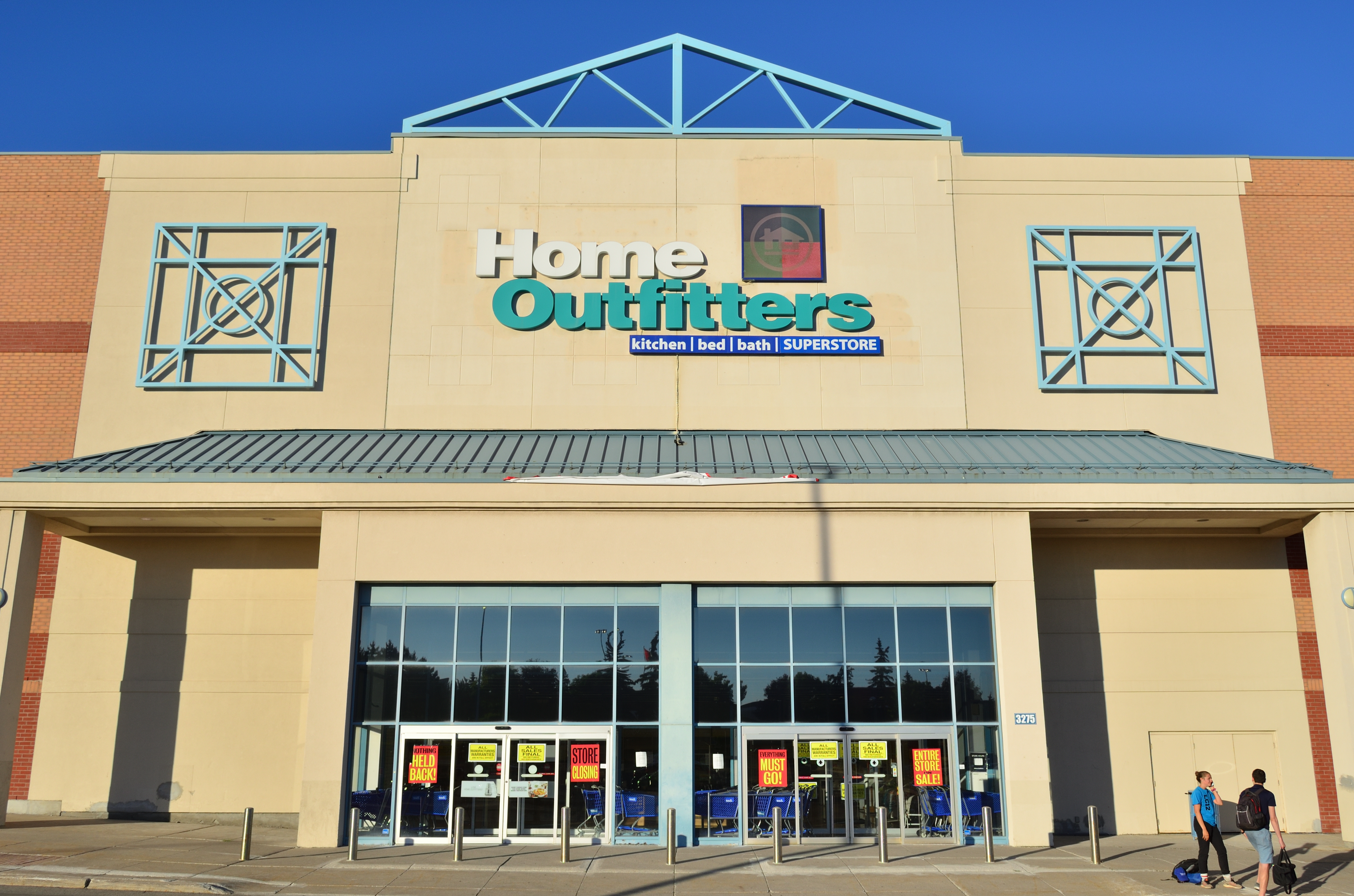
Home Outfitters at First Markham Place (now closed) in Markham, Ontario

Home Outfitters (known as Déco Découverte in Quebec; originally called Bed, Bath & More) was a Canadian retail home decor chain, owned by Hudson's Bay Company, that sold bedding, towels, housewares, and other home accessories. All 37 remaining stores were phased out in July 2019.

== History ==
Home Outfitters originally launched in 1998 as Bed, Bath & More, before being revamped and relaunched under the new name in 1999. The chain peaked at 69 locations in October 2014.

In July 2014, HBC announced that it would begin integrating Home Outfitters into its Hudson's Bay retail division (including increased availability of its product line through Hudson's Bay locations and its website), along with the closure of 2 stores. In 2016, HBC rebranded three Home Outfitters locations in Winnipeg under the banner Hudson's Bay Home as a pilot. The stores closed a few years later, along with Home Outfitters.

In February 2019, HBC announced all 37 locations of Home Outfitters would be phased out.
