= Alfred Jackson Billes =

Canadian businessman and co-founder of Canadian Tire

- Born: 1 December 1902; Toronto, Ontario
- Died: 3 April 1995 (aged 92); Toronto, Ontario
- Spouse: Muriel Gertrude Moore (m. 1928)

Alfred Jackson Billes CM (1 December 1902 – 3 April 1995) was a Canadian businessman and co-founder of Canadian Tire.

== Biography ==
Born in Toronto, Ontario, Billes went at age 16 to work as a clerk at a branch of the Dominion Bank. In 1922, he used his savings to team up with his brother William to buy Hamilton Tire and Garage Ltd. in Toronto. The following year, the brothers moved the business to downtown Toronto where they began the conversion to a garage/retail business. In 1927, the brothers incorporated under the name Canadian Tire Corporation Ltd. and in 1934, Canadian Tire opened its first official associate store in Toronto. The Billes brothers expanded the business into a full line of automotive products and home and garden supplies. They created owner/operated stores throughout the province of Ontario and into Quebec and the Maritime Provinces. Then, in 1966, they opened a store in Winnipeg, Manitoba. By 1980, Canadian Tire was the most successful Canadian-owned and operated franchise in the country's history with a nationwide network of dealer-operated Canadian Tire associate stores.

On the unexpected death of his brother William in November 1956, Alfred Billes took over as president. He held the position for the next ten years and served as a director until 1988. When he stepped down as the company's president and CEO, the Board of Directors named Dean Muncaster (b. 1934) as his successor.

In 1976, Billes was made a member of the Order of Canada and, in 1990, in recognition of his contribution to the Canadian economy, was voted into the Canadian Business Hall of Fame.

Billes married Marjorie Kitchen Baldry, his second wife, but sons Fred and David and a daughter Martha were by his first wife. He died in 1995 and was interred in Toronto's Mount Pleasant Cemetery.

A publicly traded company on the Toronto Stock Exchange, Canadian Tire's Class A Non-Voting shares are widely held. However, the company has a dual share structure that gives voting control to the holders of a relatively small number of Common shares. Following the settlement of Alfred Billes' estate, in 1997, Martha Billes bought out her brothers and, through a substantial ownership of the Common shares, she has a controlling interest in the company.

In honour of Alfred Billes, the company's distribution centre in Brampton, Ontario, was named the A.J. Billes Centre.

== References and further reading ==
- Brown, Ian (1989). Freewheeling: The Feuds, Broods, and Outrageous Fortunes of the Billes Family and Canada's Favorite Company. Harper & Collins.
- McBride, Hugh (1997). Our Store: 75 Years of Canadians and Canadian Tire. Quantum Book Group. ISBN 1-895892-10-4.
