= Sport Chek =

Canadian sporting goods retailer

Sport-Chek International 2000 Ltd.

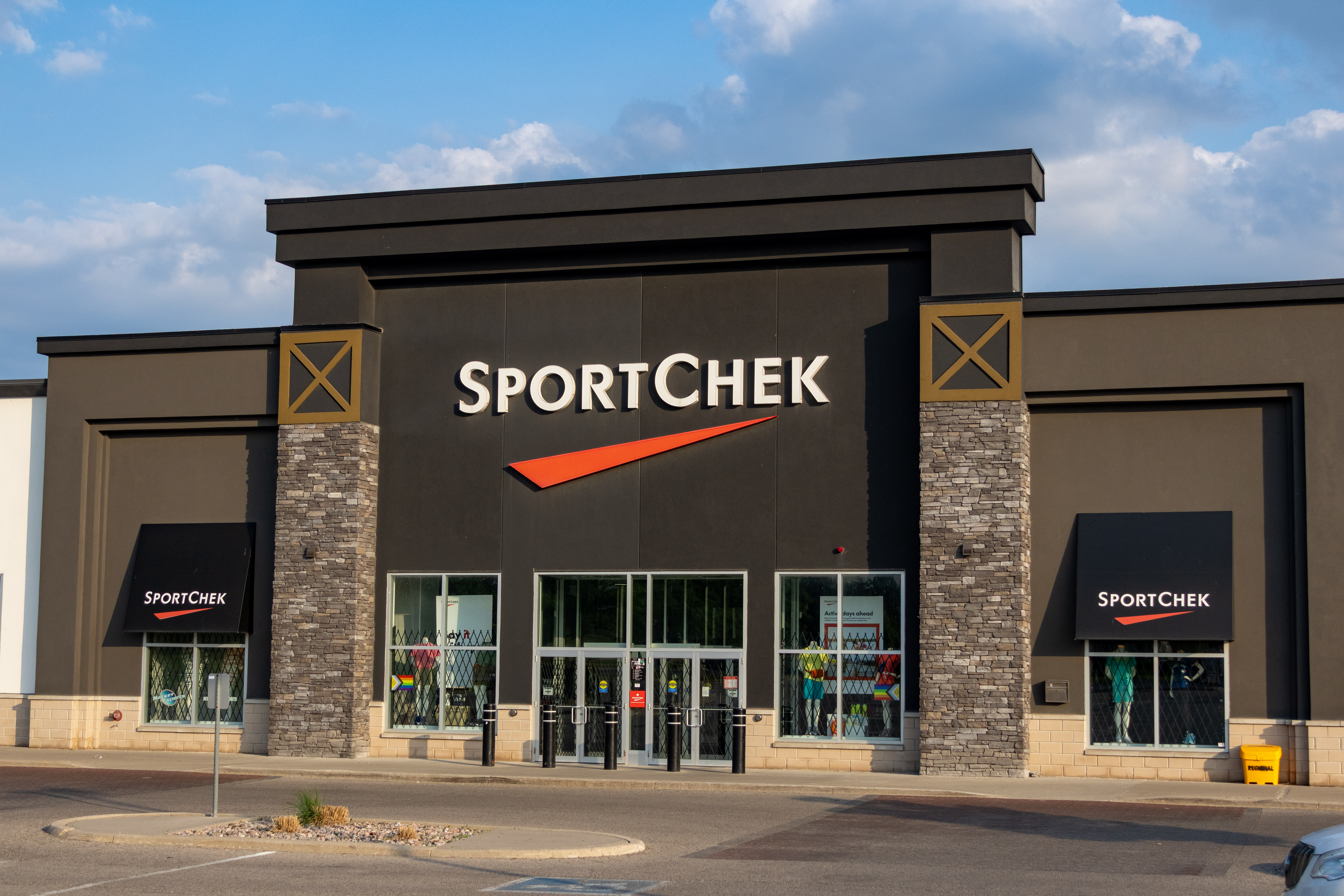
- A Sport Chek in Bowmanville, Ontario in 2025
- Trade name: Sport Chek
- Type: Subsidiary
- Founded: 1976
- Headquarters: Calgary, Alberta, Canada
- Area served: Canada
- Key people: Stephen Brinkley (president)
- Parent: FGL Sports (1976–2011); Canadian Tire (2011–present)
- Website: www.sportchek.ca

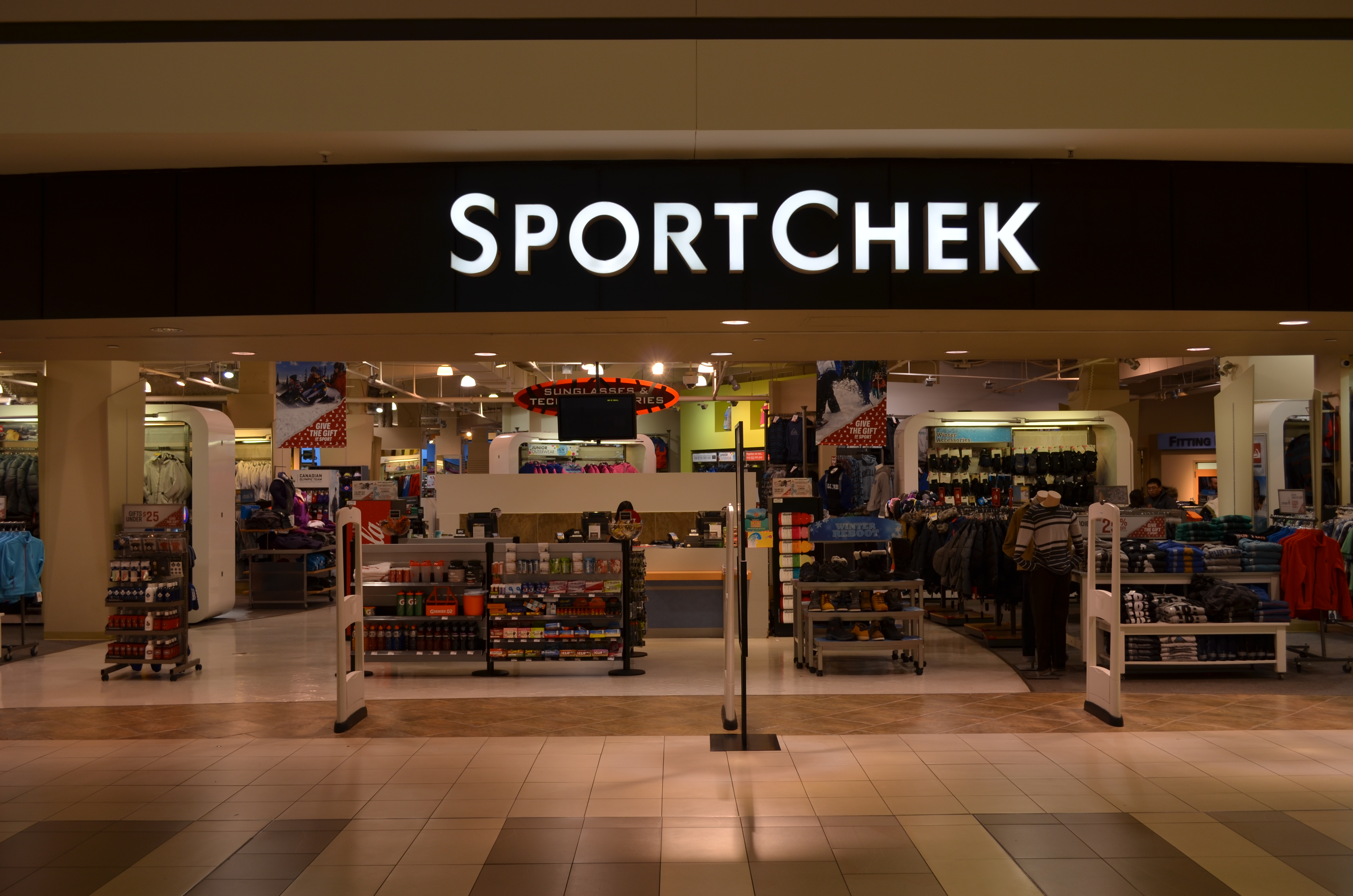
A Sport Chek store in , Thornhill, Ontario with a very rare sign, without the red check. This is now closed and replaced by Designer Row Express

Sport-Chek International 2000 Ltd. (doing business as Sport Chek) is the largest Canadian retailer of sports clothing and sporting equipment, with 191 stores throughout Canada as of 2020. It is the only national big box sporting goods retailer in Canada, although it is absent in the Northwest Territories and Nunavut, while Quebec and Yukon are served by its sister brand Sports Experts instead. Its parent company, FGL Sports, also owns over a dozen sporting brands.

In 2011, Canadian Tire bought out full corporate ownership stakes of Sport Chek's parent company, FGL Sports (then known as Forzani), for $771 million, and has since embarked on a large scale brand restructuring.

New Sport Chek stores with Samsung OLED screens, tablets, and high tech were opened at West Edmonton Mall in 2014, Square One Shopping Centre and Yorkdale Shopping Centre in 2015, and a flagship SportChek/Atmosphere opened in Sherway Gardens in the GTA in July 2016.

== See also ==
- Canadian Tire – (Current parent company)
- Sports Experts – equivalent in Quebec
- Mark's (formerly Mark's Work Wearhouse) – another unit of Canadian Tire
