= PartSource =

Canadian automotive parts store chain

PartSource Inc.

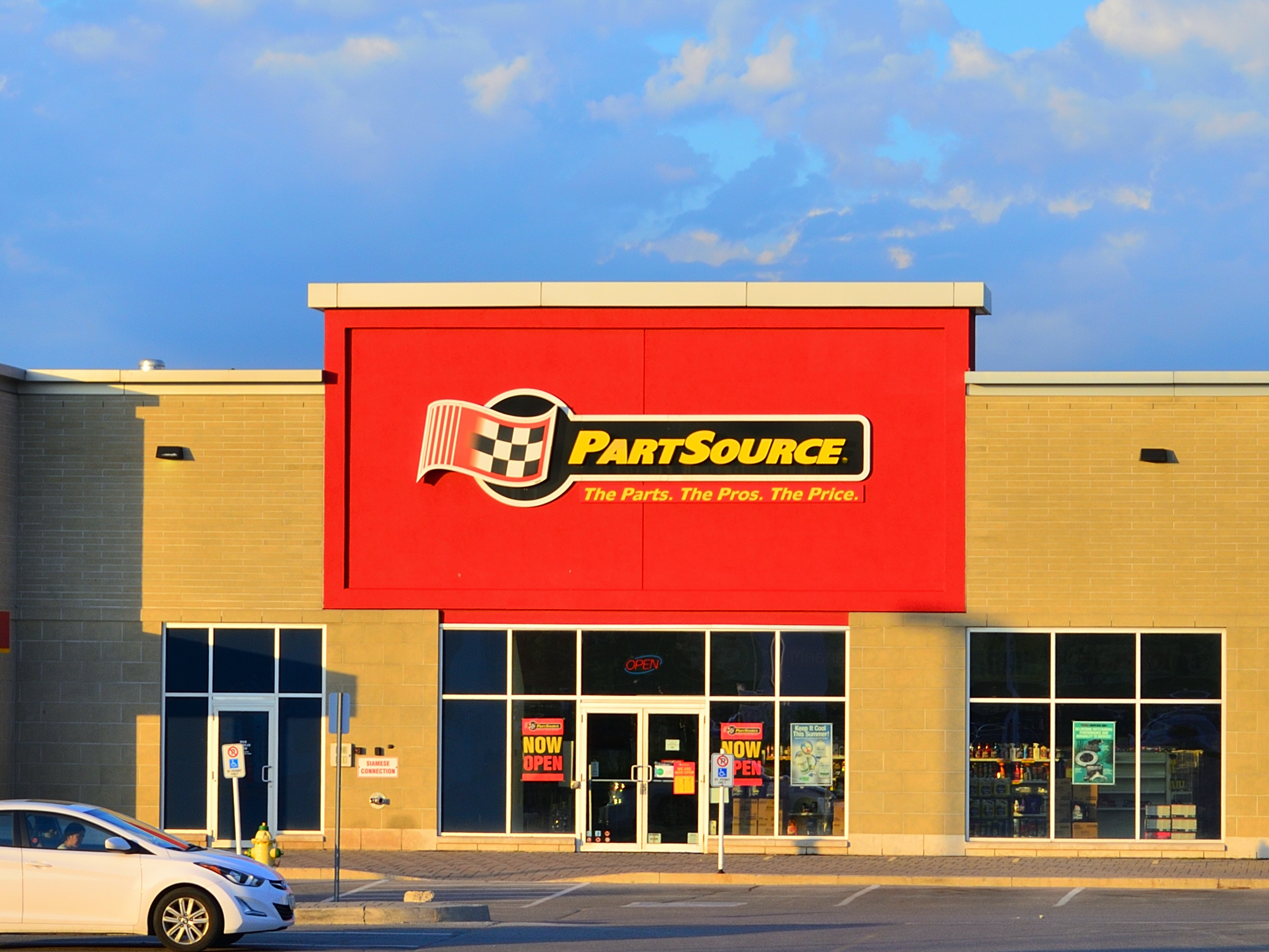
- Company type: Subsidiary
- Industry: Retail
- Founded: 1999
- Headquarters: 336 Courtland Avenue, Vaughan, Ontario, Canada
- Area served: Canada
- Key people: Sean Stokes (president)
- Products: Aftermarket auto parts, Tools
- Parent: Canadian Tire
- Website: www.partsource.ca

PartSource Inc. is a Canadian automotive parts retail chain owned by Canadian Tire. It sells name brand automotive parts, specializing in commercial sales and sales to customers who work on their own vehicles.

Founded in 1996, the retailer has 80 stores in Nova Scotia, Ontario, Manitoba, Saskatchewan, and Alberta. Originally composed of corporately owned and franchise-operated stores, as of November 2013 all PartSource stores are owned and operated by Canadian Tire Corporation.

Most of the 15,000 products are name brand items.

As of March 6, 2015, PartSource no longer offers a 10% price match guarantee. Prior to this they would match and beat any local competitor's price by 10%.
