= Mark's =

Canadian clothing and footwear retailer

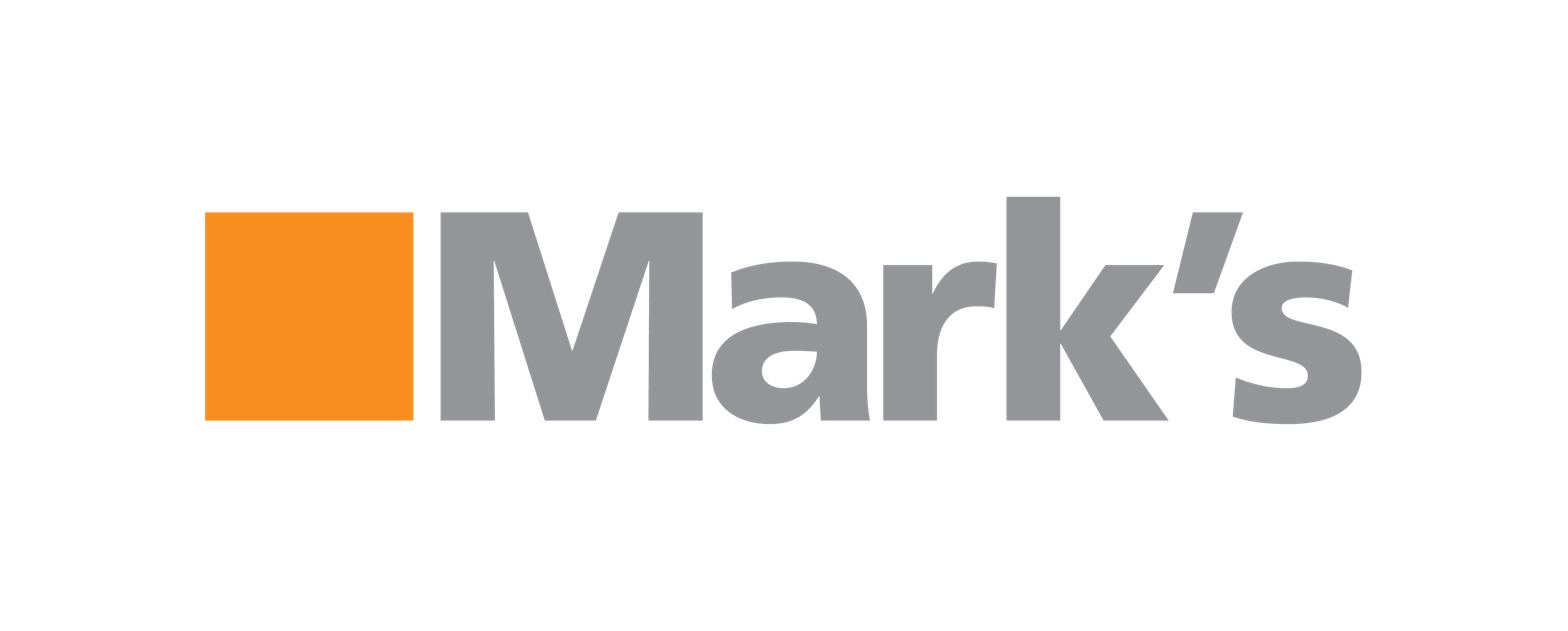
- Trade name: Mark's
- Formerly: Mark's Work Wearhouse (1977-2012)
- Company type: Subsidiary
- Industry: Retail
- Founded: August 14, 1977; 48 years ago
- Founder: Mark Blumes
- Headquarters: Calgary, Alberta, Canada
- Number of locations: 385
- Area served: Canada
- Key people: PJ Czank
- Products: Clothing; Footwear
- Parent: Canadian Tire (2002–present)
- Website: www.marks.com

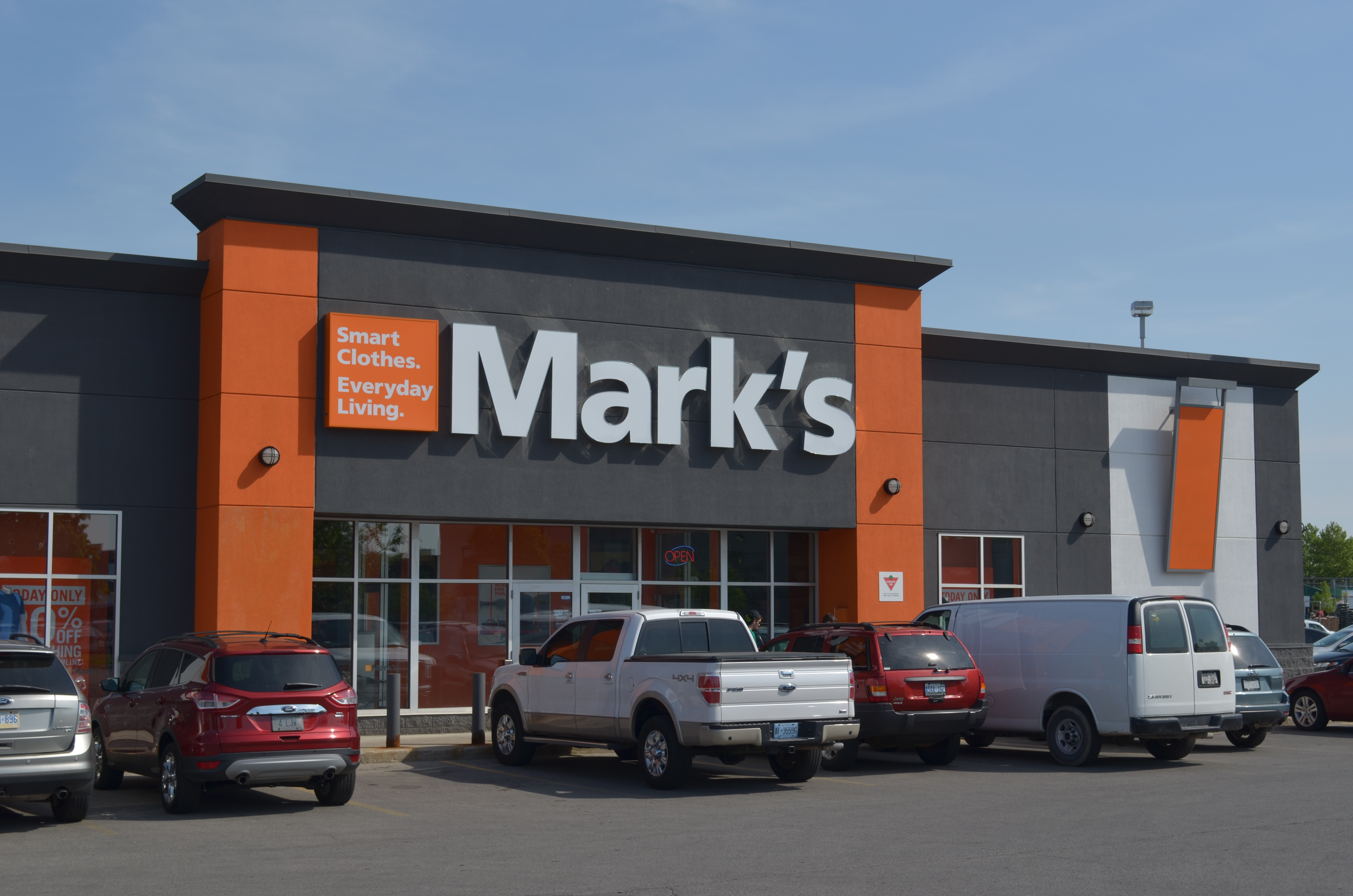
Mark's in London, Ontario

Mark's (known as La Ouérasse and L'Équipeur since 1990 in Quebec) is a Canadian clothing and footwear retailer specializing in casual and industrial wear. Beginning in 1977 as Mark's Work Wearhouse in Calgary, Alberta, it evolved from an industrial accessories dealer to a men and women's casual and industrial wear retailer. The company operates over 380 stores across Canada and has been a subsidiary of Canadian Tire since 2002.

== History ==
Mark Blumes, formerly a retail executive for the Hudson's Bay Company, opened Mark's Work Wearhouse in Calgary, Alberta, on August 14, 1977. The store was located in the southeast corner of Calgary, at Centre Street and Glenmore Trail. Following rapid expansion, the company became publicly traded in 1981, with an initial public offering worth $14,000,000. In 1995, the Board of Directors appointed Garth Mitchell as President and Chief Operating Officer of the company. Under Mitchell, the chain entered a new phase characterized by growth and acquisition. The 140 stores generated a revenue of $250 million in 1996, and the company acquired Work World, which increased revenues by $500 million in six years.

Canadian Tire Corporation purchased Mark’s Work Wearhouse for $109 million in early 2002. At this time, Mark's Work Wearhouse operated 325 corporate and franchisee stores in Canada. The acquisition provided Mark’s Work Wearhouse with additional capital which allowed it to grow between 2001 and 2008 to 372 stores across Canada. Together, Mark’s Work Wearhouse and Canadian Tire created "combo stores" at 65 Canadian Tire locations.

In 2012, the company rebranded as "Mark's" as part of a strategy to appeal to a wider customer base and reflect an expanded product assortment. In May 2018, Canadian Tire Corporation announced their purchase of Helly Hansen, a brand Mark's previously featured for over ten years.

As of 2026, Mark's operates more than 380 stores across Canada.

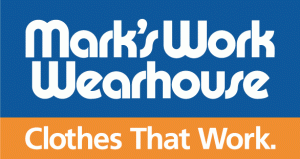
Original Mark's Work Wearhouse logo used prior to 2002

== Products ==
Mark's is an apparel and footwear retailer, selling men's and women's industrial, business, casual and active clothing and footwear, as well as a full line of health wear, including hospital scrubs, hygienic wear and accessories. Mark’s holds a number of private labels, including Dakota, Denver Hayes and WindRiver. They also carry an additional assortment of national brands, including Levi's, Tough Duck, Carhartt. A variety of Mark’s footwear is CSA approved.
