= NHL uniform =

Ice hockey uniform worn in NHL

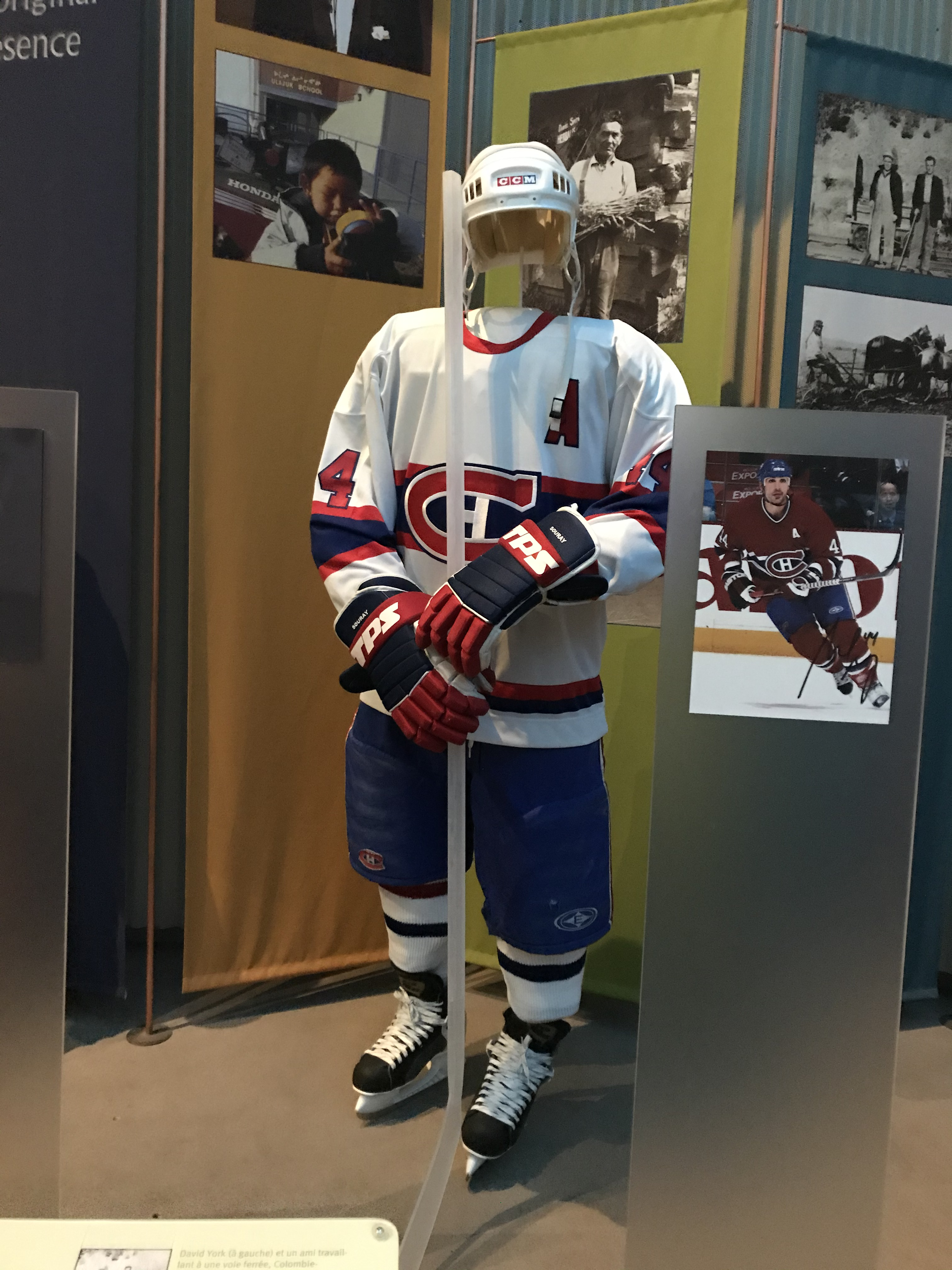
Montreal Canadiens hockey uniform of Sheldon Souray, on display at the Canadian Museum of History

Players in the National Hockey League wear equipment which allows their team affiliation to be easily identified, unifying the image of the team. An NHL uniform consists of a hockey jersey, hockey pants, socks, gloves, and a helmet.

== Background ==
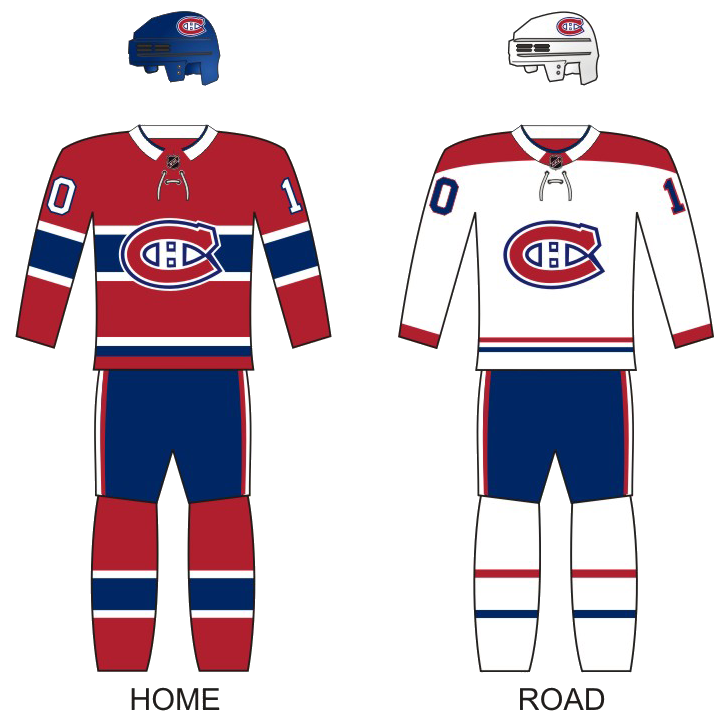
Montreal Canadiens home and road uniforms

Historically, the only standardized piece of the equipment has been the sweater (jersey), which has to be of identical design by the same company for all members of a team. Other elements merely have a number scheme, allowing individual players to select their own brand and model coloured to match the uniform but not necessarily identical in appearance. Sticks and other equipment worn under the clothes have no requirements in terms of matching a team's colours; teams will sometimes provide players with team-brand undershirts or other under-clothing, but players are not required or limited to wearing them.

Goaltenders often have their pads and gloves and masks coloured to match the team's colour scheme, but there is no requirement for this equipment to match, and goaltenders who transfer to a new team often play in their old equipment until new colours can be obtained. Alternatively, players who transfer teams have sometimes had their gloves painted temporarily to match the required colours, and are given new helmets.

Each team is required to have two sweater designs: One with a white base (or historically, a yellow colour), and one with a darker-coloured base. Between the 1970–71 and 2002–03 seasons, NHL teams wore white (or yellow) uniforms at home and dark uniforms on the road (which is the current convention in some low-level ice hockey leagues). Since the 2003–04 season, NHL teams typically wear the dark colour at home and the light color (white or yellow) for road games; there are occasional single-game exceptions. The only elements allowed by NHL rules to be interchangeable between the two sets of equipment are the pants and gloves. As of 2023, some teams (notably the Carolina Hurricanes, San Jose Sharks, and Anaheim Ducks) have been interchanging the helmet color (i.e., wearing dark helmet with the white uniform.)

=== Third Sweater Program ===
Starting in 1995 (excluding a few prior isolated instances), some teams began to design a third sweater, or alternate sweater, which allowed them to experiment with new designs or throwback to a vintage design. Though they are termed third sweaters, they can actually entail an entirely separate look from the primary equipment, often including alternate socks, and sometimes alternate helmets and other equipment. Some third sweaters have eventually become the bases for new primary sweater designs.

Third sweaters are typically worn only a few times a season by special permission of the league, based on a list of requested games. They can also be worn during selected playoff games. The third sweater program, as the NHL came to call it, was temporarily suspended on two occasions: for the 2007–08 season (due to logistical problems with the introduction of the Reebok Edge sweater that was unveiled at the 2007 NHL All-Star Game) and for the 2017–18 season (due to the introduction of the Adidas sweater).

A team's desire to wear their third sweater sometimes requires the opposing team to wear their home or road sweater when the opposite would be normally worn, due to the colour of the third sweater. This can occur when a road team wishes to wear a coloured third sweater, or a home team wishes to wear a white third sweater, as there must be one team each wearing white and coloured uniforms in a game. This can require a team to carry two sets of uniforms and equipment on the road, whether they are using their third sweaters, or are playing against a team who is.

For the 2019–20 season, the Buffalo Sabres wore a white commemorative jersey for 13 home games featuring gold trim to celebrate 50 years of NHL hockey in Buffalo. In the 2018–19 season, the New Jersey Devils (sweater modeled after the home sweater the team wore from 1982 to 1992) were the only team to wear a white third sweater. The Washington Capitals (2011 NHL Winter Classic sweater modeled after the sweater the team wore from 1974 to 1995) were the only NHL team to have a white third sweater from the 2011–12 season to the 2014–15 season, when they were replaced by red sweaters of the same design. The Philadelphia Flyers used a special white third sweater for their 50th anniversary in the 2016–17 season.

== Sweaters ==
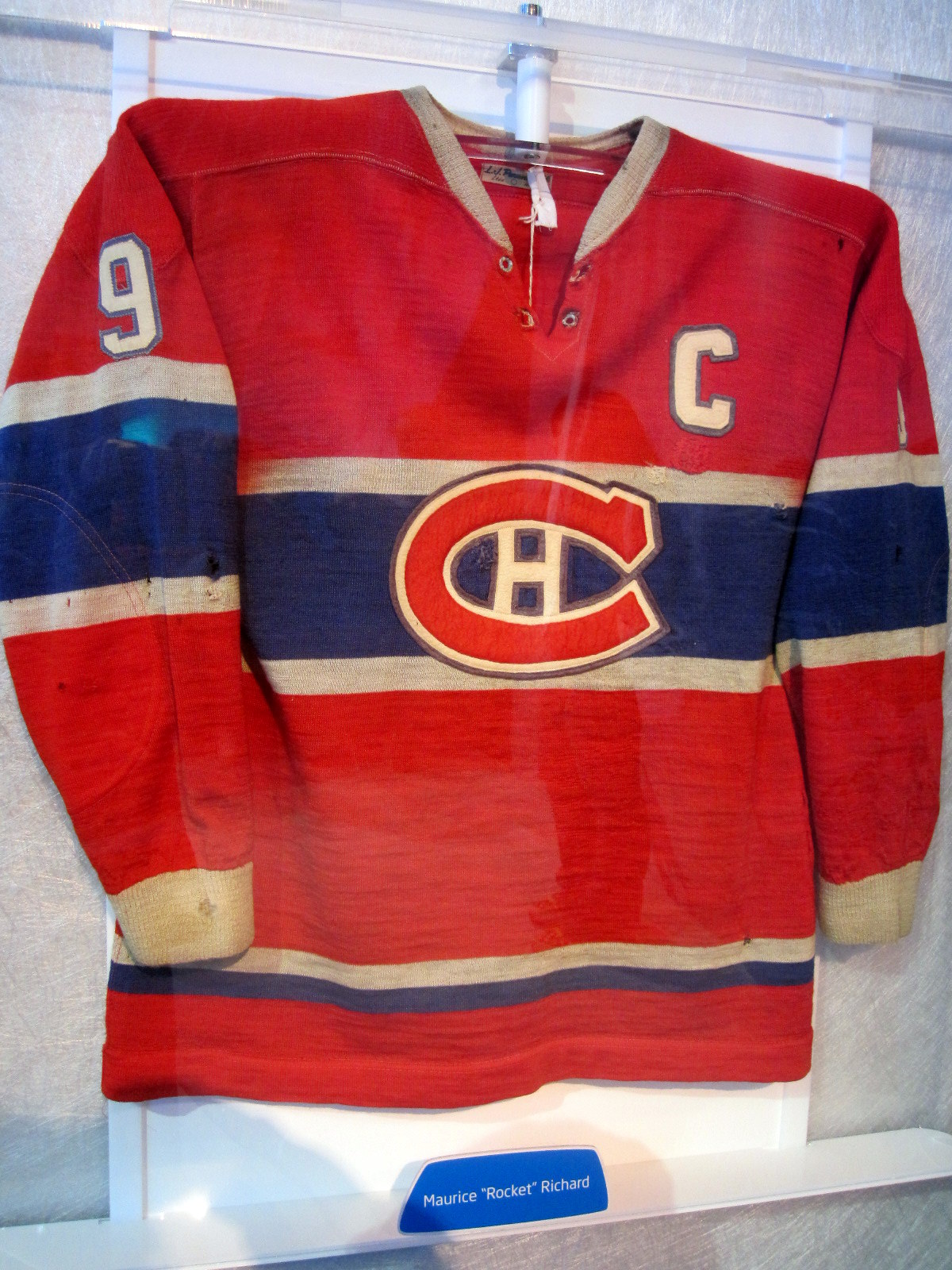
Montreal Canadiens sweater (jersey) worn by Maurice Richard during his final NHL season in 1959–60 on display at LiveCity Downtown

As hockey originates as an outdoor winter sport where players wore sweaters, this terminology has been retained to describe what is probably the most recognized element of a team's equipment (which is the only element also mass marketed to the public).

Most NHL sweaters (jerseys) display the team's primary logo in the center of the chest, while some also display secondary logos on the shoulders. Each player in a team's lineup for a game must have a different number displayed on the back of their sweater, as well as the player's surname above their number on the back of their sweater. While not required, teams typically place their numbers on each upper arm as well. Team captains and alternate captains wear the letters "C" and "A" respectively on the front of their sweaters. Sweaters have a loop of fabric sewn into the inside back, called a "fight strap" or "tie-down", which must be secured to the player's pants during a game, to prevent the sweater from being pulled over the player's head in a fight. In recent years NHL teams generally give players 3-4 sets of white and dark jerseys annually, with special sets being introduced for alternate/heritage designs or special games.

In recent years, teams have sold both "pro" model sweaters, ostensibly identical to those worn by players, and "replica" quality sweaters which are cheaper versions that typically use cheaper production methods and lower-quality materials. Replica versions typically lack the fight strap, and in recent years have been created by Fanatics.

=== History ===
Prior to 2000, different NHL teams had contracts with different manufacturers for their sweaters. Manufacturers included CCM, Koho, Nike, Starter, and Pro Player.

==== 2000–2007 ====
From the 2000–01 season, up to the 2005–06 season, all team sweaters were made by The Hockey Company in an NHL-wide deal, and were branded with subsidiary brands. The Koho brand was on dark sweaters and third sweaters, while the CCM brand was on the white sweaters. The Hockey Company began the practice of putting the manufacturer's logo on the back of the sweater, below the neck, rather than on the back of the waist hem, as had previously been the practice. Jofa, another subsidiary, made the sweaters for referees and linesmen until the 2005–06 season, when they were re-branded CCM which they remain as of 2008–09.

Following Reebok's purchase of The Hockey Company, all official NHL team sweaters were switched to the Reebok (Rbk Hockey) brand, while cheaper replica sweaters sold to fans retained the CCM branding. Reebok logos were on the side boards in all NHL arenas (for marketing purposes) just above the blue and red lines.

==== Reebok Edge (2007–2017) ====
The Rbk Edge, or simply Edge, was a newer line of sweaters designed by Reebok. They were announced by Reebok after nearly three years of development. The new sweaters were tighter-fitting, were less water-absorbent, and were more flexible than earlier sweaters. It was intended to make players more maneuverable on the ice. The Edge sweaters were unveiled at the 55th National Hockey League All-Star Game and began to be worn, league-wide, from the 2007–08 season. Almost every team in the league made at least minor changes to their equipment design in conjunction with implementing the new sweater style. The San Jose Sharks, Tampa Bay Lightning, Ottawa Senators, Vancouver Canucks, Dallas Stars, and Washington Capitals redesigned their equipment altogether with a new or updated logo. The Columbus Blue Jackets and Minnesota Wild used their alternate sweater from the previous three seasons as the basis for their new look, complete with the team adopting the alternate logo from their alternates as their primary logo.

Five of the Original Six teams (excluding the Boston Bruins) as well as the New Jersey Devils kept their previous styles intact when possible, with the Devils going as far as to issue a press release saying that the team had no plans for an event unveiling the Rbk Edge design, because there was nothing new to see. The Anaheim Ducks and Buffalo Sabres, who both had just redesigned their sweaters the year before the implementation of the Edge sweaters, also left theirs mostly unchanged. But the Sabres made the logo on the front of their sweater smaller and took away the silver outline on their white away sweater, and the Ducks added orange piping to their sweater's neckline.

Along with the traditional differences between the replica and authentic versions of NHL sweaters, the replica (billed as "premier") versions of the Edge sweater sold to the public have a "jock tag" on the left side of the front near the waist with the Reebok vector, NHL logo, and sweater size.

Citing player complaints, Reebok later modified the Edge sweaters during the 2007–08 season, removing the play-dry material in the front and making the sleeves bigger. The modified sweaters, dubbed the Edge 2.0, made their debut at the 2008 NHL Winter Classic on January 1, 2008. On that occasion, the participating Buffalo Sabres and Pittsburgh Penguins both used throwback designs for the jerseys. Other teams followed suit, with some players wearing the original Edge design for a few years afterward.

==== Adidas ADIZERO (2017–2024) ====
In September 2015, the NHL and Adidas, Reebok's then-parent company, announced plans for Adidas to begin manufacturing official NHL jerseys starting in the 2017–18 season. All jerseys are owned by the NHL. On June 20, 2017, the NHL unveiled new ADIZERO sweaters for each of the 31 teams, including the first uniform for the league's newest team, the Vegas Golden Knights. The new sweaters are advertised as being lighter, cooler, and stronger than previous jerseys. Due to the change, there were no third "alternate" jerseys for any NHL teams for the 2017–18 season. When the third jersey program resumed the next season, teams were given the option of wearing either one-off "Heritage" uniforms (normally throwback designs of past sweaters), full-time third jerseys, or either a combination (as is the case for the "Heritage" third jerseys worn by the Arizona Coyotes, Calgary Flames, St. Louis Blues and Winnipeg Jets) or both sets.

Beginning in the 2020–21 season, the NHL began partnering with Adidas to introduce the Reverse Retro program, where all 31 teams developed special uniforms combining traditional or throwback designs with new colour schemes. The introduction of the Reverse Retro jerseys (which were planned to be worn in specific rivalry matchups, a plan hindered by the realignment of divisions due to Covid-19) marks the first time in history that all 31 teams have at least three jerseys. For the 2022–23 season Reverse Retro designs made a return, including the newly added Seattle Kraken.

In the 2021–22 season, Adidas introduced the Primegreen jerseys. The new line is intended to be more environmentally-friendly, being manufactured with a minimum of 50 percent of recycled materials. These jerseys will be used in-game and sold commercially.

As of 2020, the NHL was the only one of the four major professional American sports leagues whose uniforms are not outfitted by Nike.

It was reported on July 28, 2022, by ESPN's Greg Wyshynski that the Adidas would no longer supply jerseys for the NHL after the conclusion of the 2023–24 season.

==== Fanatics (2024–present) ====
On March 21, 2023, the NHL introduced Fanatics as the new supplier of sweaters starting in the 2024–25 season, after agreeing to a 10-year deal with the NHL. On August 19, 2026, the NHL announced a new Hometown Remix jersey series, which will be similar to the City Connect jerseys in MLB, celebrating the culture of the area the team are from.

== See also ==
- Ice hockey equipment
- Hockey jersey
- Sportswear (activewear)
