= Ice hockey equipment =

Specialized equipment used in playing ice hockey

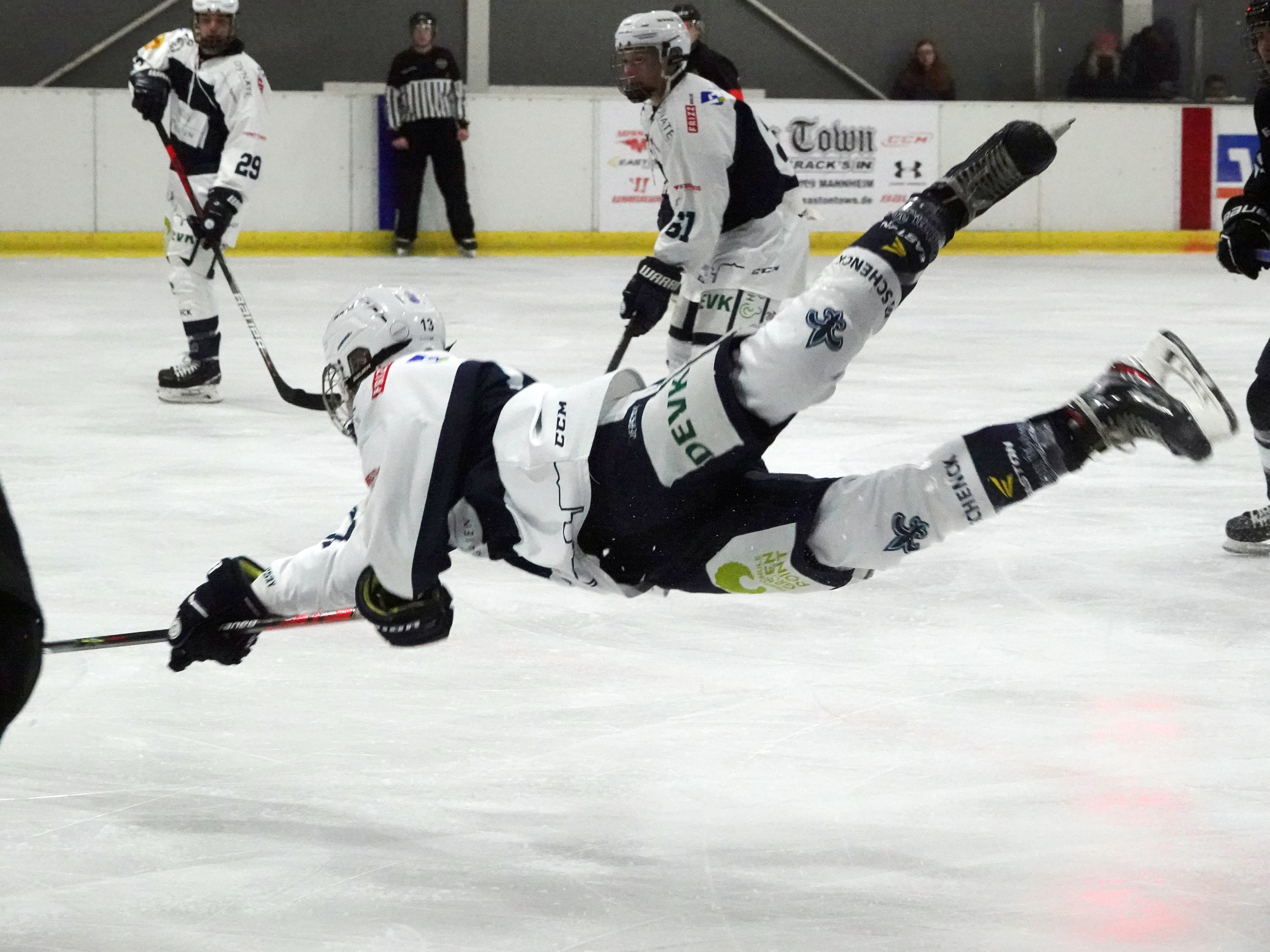
Protective equipment

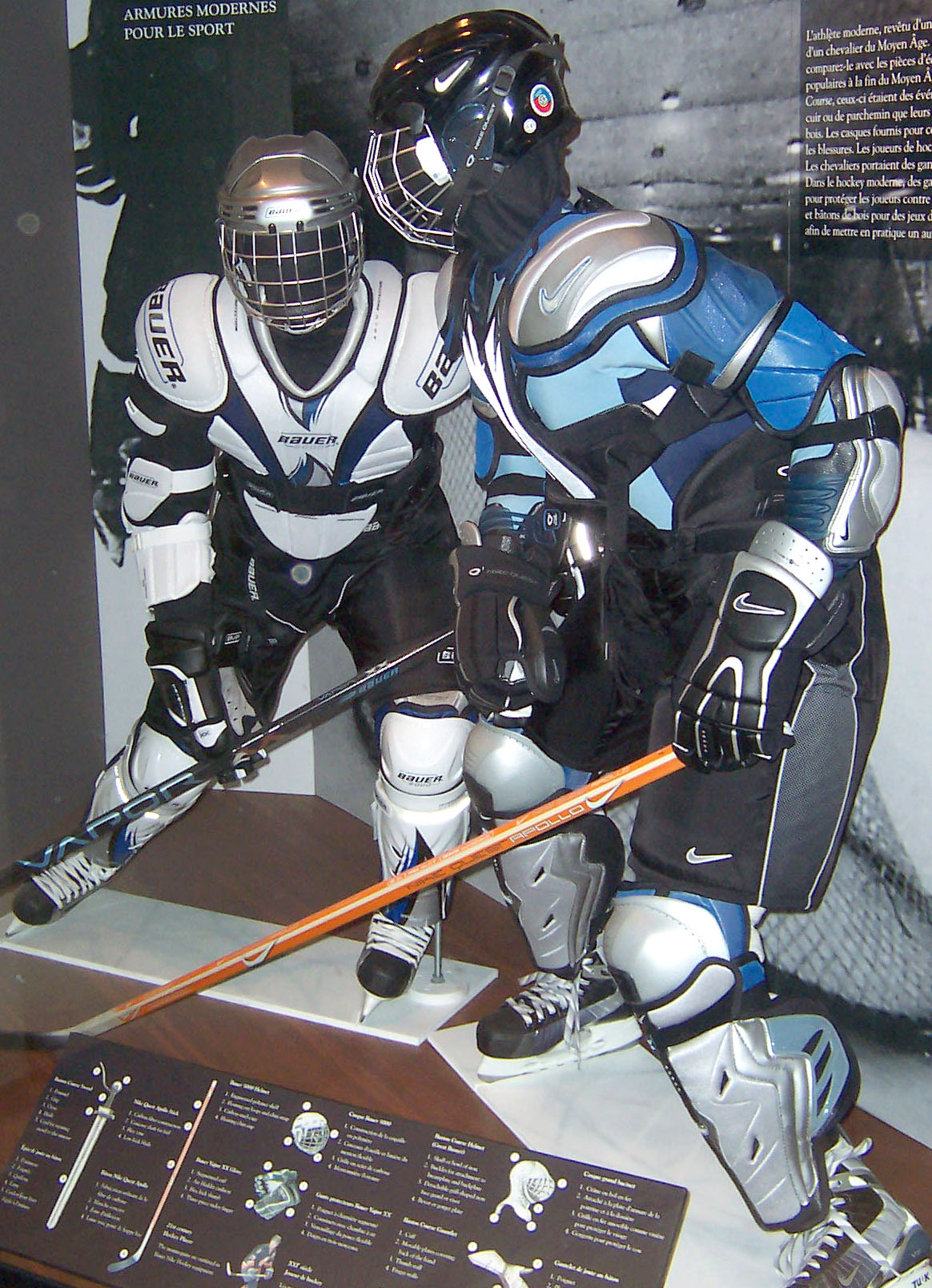
A set of full hockey equipment, minus jersey and socks at the Royal Ontario Museum, 2006

In ice hockey, players use specialized equipment both to facilitate the play of the game and for protection as this is a sport where injuries are common, therefore, all players are encouraged to protect their bodies from bruises and severe fractures.

The hard surfaces of the ice and boards, pucks being shot at high speed, and other players maneuvering (and often intentionally colliding, also known as "checking") pose multiple safety hazards. Besides ice skates and sticks, hockey players are usually equipped with an array of safety gear to lessen their risk of serious injury. This usually includes a helmet, shoulder pads/chest protector, elbow pads, mouth guard, protective gloves, heavily padded shorts, a 'jock' athletic protector, shin pads and a neck guard.

Goaltenders wear masks and much bulkier, specialized equipment designed to protect them from many direct hits from the puck. The hockey skate is usually made of a thick layer of leather or nylon to protect the feet and lower legs of the player from injury. Its blade is rounded on both ends to allow for easy maneuvering. Goaltenders' skates, however, have blades that are lower to the ice and more square than round; this is an advantage to the goalies, for whom lateral mobility and stability are more important than quick turns and speed.

== History ==
The first skates had simple metal blades tied to regular shoes. The sticks were thin pieces of wood until the 1930s. In 1897, G.H. Merritt introduced simple goalie pads by wearing the wicket-keeper's pads. All players played in simple leather gloves, until a Detroit goalie introduced the trapper and blocker in 1948, by experimenting with a rectangular piece of leather, and a baseball catcher's glove. Jacques Plante was the first regular user of the goalie mask; Clint Benedict used a crude leather version in 1928 to protect a broken nose. The goalie mask evolved to Vladislav Tretiak design, the first helmet, and cage combo. Considered primitive by today's standard, that sort of mask is used by Chris Osgood. The other helmet and cage combo, used last by Dominik Hasek and Dan Cloutier is often questioned, citing safety concerns. The most recognized goalie mask today resembles a highly fortified motorcycle helmet with a cage attached, however, the construction is very different, being a true mask rather than a helmet.

== Equipment used by regular players ==
- Helmet – A helmet with strap, and optionally a face cage or visor, is required of all ice hockey players. Hockey helmets come in various sizes, and many of the older designs can also be adjusted by loosening or fastening screws at the side or at the back. Ice hockey helmets are made of a rigid but flexible thermoplastic outer shell, usually nylon or ABS, with firm vinyl nitrile foam padding inside to reduce shocks. Even with the helmet and visor/face cage, concussions and facial injuries are common injuries in the sport.
- Neck guard – For "skaters", a neck guard typically consists of a series of nylon or ABS plates for puncture resistance, with padding for comfort and fit and a tear-resistant nylon mesh outer covering. For goalies, the neck protector is usually a curved panel of clear Lexan and hangs just underneath the mask from nylon cords, somewhat in the manner of a metal military gorget. Both are intended to reduce the potential for injury to the neck or throat by a puck or skate blade.
- Shoulder pads – Hockey shoulder pads are typically composed of a padded vest with front and back panels, with velcro straps for closure, and soft or hard-shelled shoulder caps with optional attached upper arm pads. These pads primarily protect the chest, ribs, solar plexus, spine and shoulders against flying pucks and collisions with other players or the ice. They are not required by all recreational leagues ("no-check" leagues penalize offensive checking, and lower-skill leagues rarely see pucks leave the ice) and are often omitted for practice sessions not involving body contact, but they are virtually always worn by players during games.
- Elbow pads – Provides forearm and sometimes triceps protection against pucks in addition to a reinforced elbow cup. Elbow pads are vital for all hockey players. The pads can protect the elbow joint and arm bones from bruises and prevent fractures. The elbow pads cover the elbow joint and part of the upper and lower arms. Some elbow pads do have extensions that can cover the entire upper arm. The majority of elbow pads are adjustable and are secured with Velcro straps.
- Hockey jersey – Covers the shoulder and elbow pads. Jerseys are color-coded and numbered for team and player identification, and teams, especially at upper skill levels, may have multiple jersey styles for home and away games. Traditional hockey jerseys are oversized, roughly square, and made using fabrics with limited elasticity. A "fight strap" is required to be used in most professional leagues; this connects the jersey to the inside of the pants and prevents an opponent in a fight pulling the player's jersey over their head. Newer jerseys are more form-fitting due to the use of elastic fabrics, and resemble NFL jerseys in their overall fit.
- Hockey gloves – Worn on the hands, player's gloves are constructed with a very thin leather palm and fingers, while providing substantially more padding to the outside of the hands; the gloves also reinforce the thumbs to prevent them bending backwards.
- Hockey pants – These are knee-length oversized shorts, which incorporate the thigh, pelvic, hip and tailbone pads, and cinch at the waist. They are often held up by a belt or suspenders.
- Jockstrap or ladies' pelvic protector – The jock is a protective cup which is designed to protect the genitals. The cup easily fits into a strap or some type of sports support. Some jock straps come with inbuilt garter belts so that one can wear long socks at the same time. Many companies now make "jock shorts" which are a jockstrap incorporated into a pair of boxer or athletic shorts, or into elastic shorts similar to "boxer briefs", which increases coverage of the garment and helps position the cup more securely against the player's anatomy without shifting. Similar garments, called "pelvic protectors" or informally "jillstraps", provide a hard shell protecting the female genitalia and the lower pelvis from impact.
- Garter – Garter belts are often used by players to hold up hockey socks. A garter is simply an elastic band that goes around the waist and has several straps that go down to the front and back of the legs. At the end of each strap is a clip or a hook which attaches to the sock. The latest garters belts come with Velcro straps which makes it easier to attach the socks. Many hockey pants and jock shorts now have built-in garters in the form of a velcro patch on the front and rear of the leg, which grab and hold the sock.
- Shin guards – Incorporating a kneepad as well, the shin guard has a hard plastic shell on the front and outside to protect against pucks, but usually has little or no protection on the calf. Shin guards help protect the knee joint and the frontal bones of the leg from pucks, sticks, skates, falls and other impacts. However, it is essential to buy proper shin guards. If the shin guard is too long it will slip down into the skate and prevent proper movement of the ankle; if the shin guard does not fit perfectly at the knee joint, then the patella will not be properly protected and lead to injury. There is a size scale for shin guards which most sports stores have available and which one can utilize to assess the right size.
- Hockey socks – Not to be confused with actual socks, the traditional hockey sock is a knitted wool or synthetic tube stocking without a foot. The sock covers the shin guard, and is a required part of the uniform along with the jersey, according to USA Hockey rules.
- Mouthguard – Many variants exists from standard plastic guards to custom-moldable "boil and bite" compounds that make speaking easier. In the days past, many hockey players had the front teeth missing and this was because of the failure to protect the teeth from knock downs and fights. Today, most hockey players wear mouth guards to protect their teeth and jaw. The mouth piece can also soften blows to the face and prevent jaw fractures.
- Ice skates – Hockey skates incorporate a rigid shell, form-fit to the player's foot using memory foam and/or heat-moldable components, often reinforced with metal mesh to prevent a skate blade cutting through. Unlike figure skates, hockey skate blades have a rounded heel and no toe picks as these can be dangerous in a "pile-up". Ice skates are essential for all hockey players. One should always try on a pair of hockey skates before buying them. Hockey skates come in many styles and sizes. The essential component of all skate is the interior boot, exterior holder and the attachable blade. Most skates have rigid toe caps and heel/Achilles ridge protectors. Typically the tongue of the skate should end at or just above the beginning of the shin guard.
- Hockey puck – 3 inch diameter, 1 inch thick, 6 ounces (170 g) vulcanized rubber disk. The control of this object will determine the outcome of the game.
- Hockey stick – Made of wood or composite materials, hockey sticks come in various styles and lengths. Stick dimensions vary based on the size of the player. Traditionally, all sticks were wooden up until the late 1990s; wood is inexpensive and tough, but the characteristics of each stick will be subtly different due to small changes in the grain structure. They also allow less flex before breaking. The most advanced ice hockey sticks are made from graphite and are manufactured with precise flex patterns that allow for more accuracy and power when hitting the puck; however these advantages come with a flip side of increased cost and somewhat lower overall durability. Graphite sticks come in one-piece and two-piece varieties; a two-piece stick (composed of shaft and blade) allows for greater customization with reduced parts stock required of retailers, and allows for a damaged shaft or blade to be replaced without replacing the entire stick. One-piece sticks generally have better flex characteristics towards the bottom of the shaft, but if the stick breaks or becomes unusable, it is discarded entirely.

== Goaltending equipment ==
Goalies are allowed special variations on equipment, both to increase their chance of stopping pucks and for extra protection. They offer more protection from frontal impacts, while generally providing lesser or no protection to the goalie's back. This is because a goalie should always face the action and a hit on a non-padded area is generally a mistake on the part of the goalie. Virtually all of the following equipment is required in any league:

- Goal stick – Incorporates a larger blade than player sticks as well as a widened flat shaft. These are virtually always made of wood for durability, as opposed to the carbon-fiber construction of modern player sticks, but may have fiberglass or carbon-fiber panels on the blade and shaft for increased impact resistance. Mostly used to block, but the goalie can play the puck with it. Blade may be curved to help play the puck. Stick length trends towards being shorter than player sticks to provide better coverage between the blocker and the side of the torso when in butterfly position, and also stopping the paddle flaring out when standing, creating gaps between the five-hole and the paddle.
- Goal skates – Thicker blade with a larger blade radius and less ankle support allows a goalie to slide off his skates to make "pad stops" more easily. The boot is closer to the ice surface than a regular hockey skate to prevent pucks from slipping through the area between boot and skate blade. Normal hockey skates are technically allowed as they provide propulsion and adequate protection, but are virtually never seen.
- Goalie mask or helmet and wire facemask. Masks are fitted to the player's face and can withstand multiple high-speed impacts from pucks. Most leagues now recommend or require that goalies hang a throat protector (somewhat like a gorget in form and function) and/or wear a padded neck guard to protect against pucks and skate blades. These are now required for all goalies in the NHL after a well-known incident where goalie Clint Malarchuk's jugular vein was severed in a game by player Steve Tuttle's skate blade.
- Chest and arm protector – More thickly padded in the front than a player's shoulder pads, also incorporating forearm, elbow and biceps protection. Protective area extends down to the abdomen and is usually tied onto the pants to provide seamless protection. These pads offer very little spine/back protection to save on weight and material, and to prevent heat buildup.
- Blocker – Worn on the hand that holds the stick, it is a glove with a rectangular pad on the back, used to deflect shots. Modern innovations include a curved portion to redirect blocked pucks outward instead of up or back, and a specially shaped front portion to allow 'paddle down' saves where the stick is laid horizontally on the ice surface. Blockers are generally limited in overall surface area by league rules.
- Catch glove or trapper – Worn on the opposite hand, it is used to gather up the puck on the ice or catch a flying shot. A goalie may freeze play and force a faceoff by holding or trapping the puck in the catching glove, or they may "catch and release" by catching and then dropping the puck behind the net or onto their own stick to play it. Catches are limited by league rules in width of the wrist padding, and in overall circumference of the glove.
- Goal jock or jill – Better pelvic protection and more padding in front of the cup than a player's jock. Provides lower abdomen protection and a larger/stronger cup.
- Goal pants – Incorporating thicker thigh padding and additional pelvic/hip protection, but reduced groin protection (this is mitigated by the jock and allows for increased flexibility).
- Goal pads – Perhaps the most visible part of a goalie's equipment, goalie "legs" are thickly padded, flat-faced leg pads covering the top of the skate, the player's shin and the knees, and incorporate additional padding on the inside of the leg and knee to protect the knee joint when dropping into a "butterfly". Pads are no wider than 11 inches (280 mm) and sized to fit the individual player's legs.
- Socks – Cover the leg from the foot to just above the knee or above. Usually this is the only protection afforded to a goalie's calves, as the back of the cheaper model goal pads are simply a series of straps. Expensive goal pads do offer flexible flaps designed to protect the calf.

Normally the stick is held in the right hand with the blocker, and the catch glove is on the left. However, "full right" goalies reverse this, holding a right-hand curve stick in the left hand and catching with the right. This is largely personal preference, depending mostly on which hand the goalie is most comfortable catching with. The stick blade may be flat or curved to assist in playing the puck, depending on personal preference and stick handling style; a flat blade is generally better for stopping the puck, while a more curved blade allows for easier "lifting" of shots off the blade to the forwards/center. The shaft of the stick blade may be slightly curved to assist in picking it up off the ice when dropped.

== Companies and brands ==
Consolidated companies
Owner	Companies and brands
Altor Equity Partners	CCM, Jofa, Koho, Titan, Canadien, Heaton
Peak Achievement Athletics Inc.	Bauer, Cooper, Itech, Mission, Easton, Micron
Canadian Tire Corporation Limited	Sherwood, Victoriaville, Hespeler, TPS
New Balance	Warrior, Innovative, MIA Sports, Montreal
Roustan Hockey Ltd.	Christian, Northland, Torspo, McKenney
Vaughn Custom Sports Canada Ltd.	Vaughn, Eagle
Independent hockey companies
Brian's
Graf
Tackla
Winnwell
Multisport companies in hockey
Fischer
STX
True Temper

Extant companies that have produced hockey equipment but no longer do include Nike, Reebok, and Lange.

== Facemask controversy ==
Youth and college hockey players are required to wear a mask made from metal wire or transparent plastic attached to their helmet that protects their face during play. Professional and adult players may instead wear a visor that protects only their eyes, or no mask at all; however, some provincial and state legislation require full facial protection at all non-professional levels. Rules regarding visors and face masks are mildly controversial at professional levels. Some players feel that they interfere with their vision or breathing, or encourage carrying of the stick up high in a reckless manner, while others believe that they are a necessary safety precaution.

In fact, the adoption of safety equipment has been a gradual one at the North American professional level, where even helmets were not mandatory until the 1980s. The famous goalie, Jacques Plante, had to suffer an easy blow to the face with a flying puck in 1959 before he could persuade his coach to allow him to wear a protective goalie mask in play.

== See also ==
- Hockey puck
- Ice hockey goaltending equipment
- NHL uniform
