= Canadien (brand) =

Canadian brand of ice hockey equipment

- Product type: Ice hockey equipment
- Current owner: Birch Hill Equity Partners
- Country: Canada
- Introduced: 1969

Canadien is a Canadian brand of ice hockey equipment owned by Birch Hill Equity Partners through its portfolio company Sport Maska Inc. The Canadien brand was created in 1969 in Drummondville, Quebec and was manufactured originally by the company Les industries du hockey Canadien, Inc. The original company was sold in 1978, and since that time the Canadien brand has gone through numerous ownership changes. Since 1998, it has been part of a consolidated group of six hockey brands that comprises Canadien, CCM, Heaton, Jofa, Koho, and Titan. In 2017, Birch Hill Equity Partners of Toronto acquired the group of brands, which are held by the company Sport Maska. While CCM remains the flagship brand of the group, products made under the Canadien name appear occasionally.

== History ==
In 1969, a group of 15 investors joined to form a hockey stick manufacturing company called Les industries du hockey Canadien, Inc. Among the investors were Montreal Canadiens players Serge Savard, Yvan Cournoyer, and Guy Lapointe. The company established its operations in Drummondville, Quebec, the hometown of Cournoyer. Canadien grew rapidly and by 1976 held 17 per cent of the hockey stick market, the second largest market share after Sher-Wood.

In 1977, graphic designer Georges Huel designed the company's wordmark and triangle logo.

In late 1978, the Canadien company was acquired by Action Traders, Inc. of Toronto. The following year, Action Traders sold Canadien to Amer of Finland. The previous year, Amer had bought Koho, a purchase that expanded the company's reach in the hockey market. Amer continued to produce hockey equipment under the Koho and Canadien names until 1986, when it sold its hockey operations to Karhu, also of Finland. Karhu had entered the hockey market in 1972 when it acquired Titan, and then in 1985 it purchased Jofa from Volvo. In the early 1990s, Karhu acquired goalie equipment company Heaton, creating a portfolio of five hockey brands.

Karhu's hockey operations were transferred to its Canadian arm Karhu Canada, Inc., which was renamed the Sports Holdings Corporation in the 1990s. In 1998, Sports Holdings was acquired by SLM International, the holding company for Sport Maska, Inc., which itself owned the CCM brand. In 1999, SLM renamed itself The Hockey Company. As the owner of the CCM, Jofa, Titan, Koho, Canadien, and Heaton brands, The Hockey Company became the dominant player in the hockey equipment market.

In June 2004, Reebok acquired The Hockey Company. After the sale, it phased out all brands save CCM and introduced its own RBK line of products. In August 2005, Adidas acquired Reebok. Adidas continued to produce hockey equipment under the CCM brand primarily.

In July 2017, Adidas sold its hockey holdings to Birch Hill Equity Partners of Toronto for around $110 million. Its hockey operations were at this time consolidated in the subsidiary Sport Maska, Inc., which owned the rights to the six brands. Since the purchase in 2017, CCM has remained the flagship brand of the group, though products that use the other five brand names appear sporadically.
