= Vaughn Hockey =

Manufacturer of ice hockey equipment

- Company type: Private
- Industry: Sports equipment
- Founded: 1982; 44 years ago
- Founder: Mike Vaughn
- Headquarters: U.S.
- Products: Ice hockey protective gear
- Website: vaughnhockey.com

Vaughn Hockey (also known as Vaughn Custom Sports) is a manufacturing company of ice hockey equipment founded in 1982 by company President Mike Vaughn.

Based in Oxford, Michigan, and London, Ontario, Vaughn became one of the first major hockey production companies to use multiple foam layers in equipment.

Products manufactured by Vaughn include mostly protective gear such as goalie masks, pants, neck guards, shoulder pads, shin guards, gloves, blockers, jockstraps, elbow pads. Other items include sticks, and bags.

In past years, Vaughn Hockey was the North American manufacturer and distributor of Swiss company "Graf Hockey".
