= Cooperalls =

Brand of ice hockey equipment

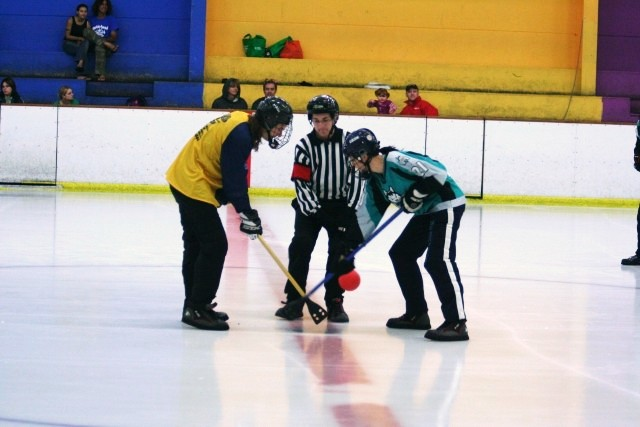
Broomball players wearing ankle length sports pants

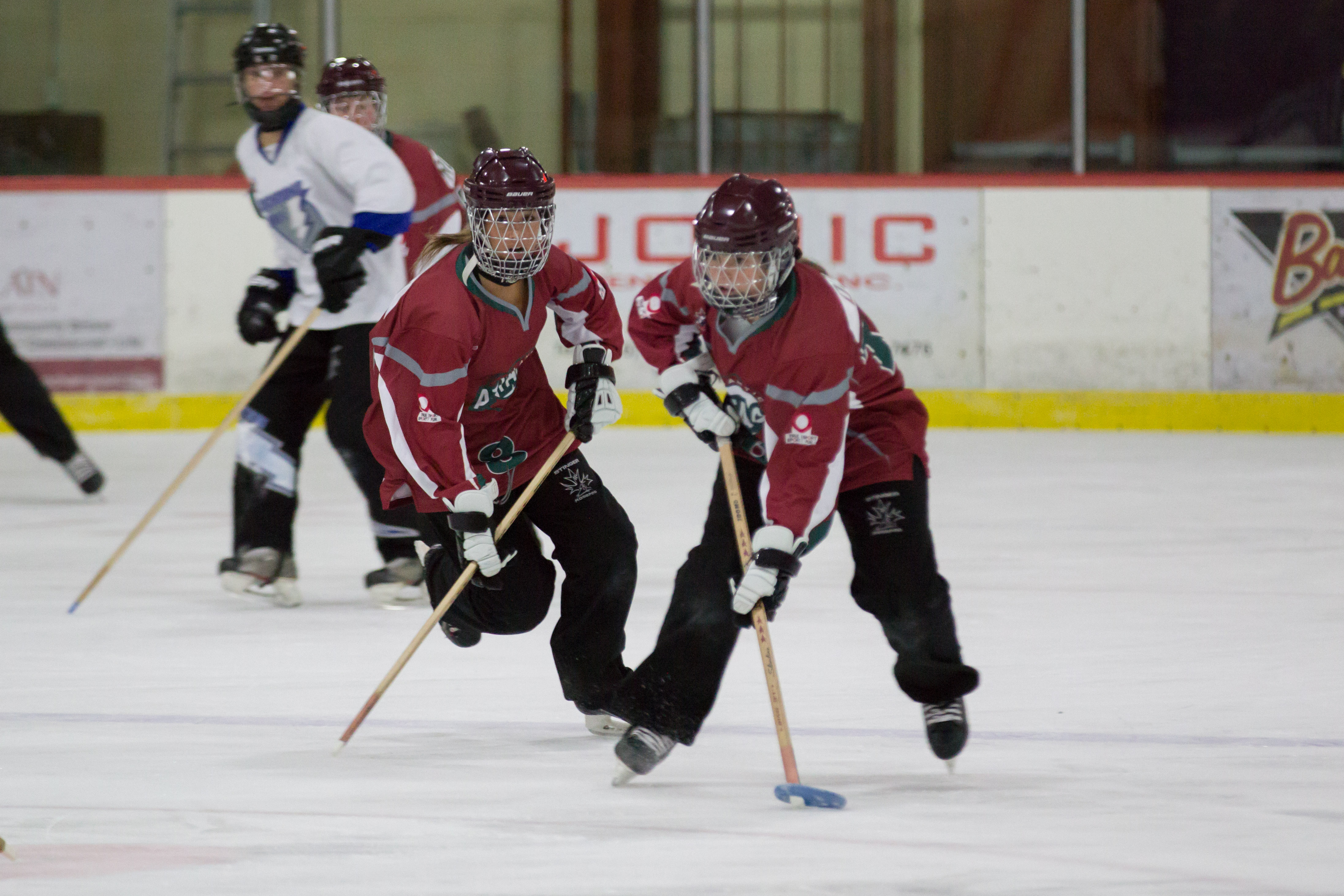
Ringette players wearing ankle length sports pants

Cooperalls were a brand of ice hockey equipment manufactured by Cooper Canada. The name has since become a generic term for all hockey pants featuring a waist-to-ankle outer shell and the basic design remains popular in the sports of ringette and broomball but not ice hockey.

== Design ==
Cooperalls were designed by Brian Heaton, the senior designer for Cooper Canada from 1972 to 1975 and were used in ice hockey, ringette, and broomball. Promoted as "a complete hockey uniform system" it consisted of an elasticated girdle extending from the middle of the rib cage to the top of the knees, worn beneath a tracksuit-style woven nylon outer shell covering waist to ankle. The girdle had pockets in to which lightweight, compression moulded foam pads were placed and the close fitting nature of the garment ensured that the pads always stayed in contact with the areas of the body they were designed to protect. This replaced the traditional combination of short hockey pants and socks, and Cooper claimed that when combined with their own brand of extra light shin guards, shoulder pads and gloves the system weighed 40% less than a conventional uniform. As well as being considerably lighter, the system offered players greater freedom of movement and improved hip, pelvis and thigh protection.

A short-legged outer shell, called the "Cooperall Coupé" (from the French past participle coupé, to cut) was also available for traditionalists. The long pant was first adopted by the Ontario Hockey League in the late 1970s and was tested in training camps by a number of National Hockey League teams, including the Winnipeg Jets and the Quebec Nordiques.

== CCM Propac ==
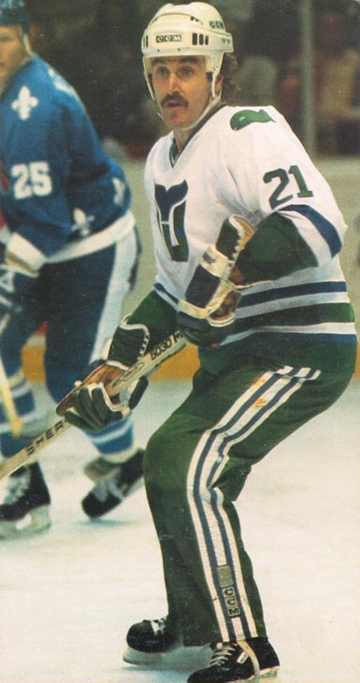
Blaine Stoughton in the 1982-83 season wearing the Propac pants for the Hartford Whalers

A similar style of girdle and long pant, called the "Propac", was manufactured by CCM. This design was worn by the Philadelphia Flyers in the 1981–82 NHL season, and both the Flyers and the Hartford Whalers in the 1982–83 NHL season.

== Ringette and Broomball ==
Today, players in the sports of ringette and broomball still wear ankle length sports pants whose designs were inspired by the original design of Cooperalls and can be seen widely used across both sports including at major international events. Ringette players however also wear ice hockey skates while broomball players do not use ice skates of any kind.

== Criticism in ice hockey ==
The long pant design received considerable criticism in ice hockey circles:

- Player safety compromised by less friction with the ice during a fall, causing players to slide more violently into the boards.
- Design was too warm.
- Goalies complained that the puck was difficult to see against the long black pants worn by the Flyers players.

The NHL subsequently passed a rule that teams had to wear short pants and home and away socks from the 1983–84 season onwards. However, they remained popular in amateur hockey and inline hockey throughout the 1980s and the girdle and short shell design is still available from some hockey manufacturers.

== See also ==
- Hockey pants
