= Tackaberry =

Tackaberry is a surname. Notable people with the surname include:

- George Tackaberry (1874–1937), Canadian boot maker
- John Tackaberry (1912–1969), American radio and television writer
- Thomas Tackaberry (1923–2017), United States Army general

== See also ==
- Tackaberry Airport, an airport in St. Clair County, Michigan, United States
