= CCM (ice hockey) =

Canadian brand of ice hockey equipment

CCM Hockey
- Trade name: CCM Hockey
- Type: Private
- Industry: Sporting goods
- Founded: 1899; 127 years ago in Weston, Ontario, Canada
- Headquarters: Montreal, Quebec, Canada
- Products: Ice hockey sticks, skates, helmets, shoulder pads, elbow pads, goaltender masks, knee pads, throat collar, team uniforms; Inline skates; Bicycles
- Owner: The Hockey Company (1991–2004); Reebok (2004–2005); Adidas (2005–2017); Birch Hill Equity Partners (2017–2024); Altor Equity Partners (2024–)
- Parent: Sport Maska Inc.
- Website: ccmhockey.com

CCM Hockey is a Canadian brand of ice hockey equipment owned by Altor Equity Partners through its portfolio company Sport Maska Inc. The history of the brand traces to 1905, when Canada Cycle and Motor Limited, founded in 1899, began manufacturing hockey equipment as a secondary business. After Canada Cycle went bankrupt in 1982, it sold off its cycling and hockey divisions to separate owners. The hockey division was acquired by Sport Maska, a Quebec-based manufacturer of jerseys.

In 1991, Sport Maska was placed under the ownership of a new holding company called SLM International. By 1998, SLM's portfolio of brands had grown to include Canadien, CCM, Heaton, Jofa, Koho, and Titan; in 1999, SLM changed its name to The Hockey Company. In 2004, Reebok purchased The Hockey Company; a year later, Reebok was itself purchased by Adidas. In 2017, Adidas sold all of its hockey operations and brand rights, which remained consolidated under Sport Maska, to the private equity firm Birch Hill Equity Partners. In October 2024, Altor Equity Partners of Sweden purchased a majority stake in Sport Maska, and in January 2025 was joined by Northleaf Capital Partners.

CCM's range of products for hockey includes sticks, skates, helmets, shoulder pads, elbow pads, goaltender masks, goaltender pads, goaltender gloves, knee pads, throat collars, and team uniforms for the American Hockey League.

== History ==
=== Canada Cycle and Motor era, 1905–1982 ===
CCM was founded in 1899 after the collapse of the bicycle market. Established "when the operations of four major Canadian bicycle manufacturers amalgamated: H. A. Lozier, Massey-Harris, Goold, and Welland Vale Manufacturing." CCM produced bicycles for many years in the area of Weston, Toronto, Ontario. They also briefly produced the Russell automobile.

By 1905, with saturation in the bicycle market, CCM began producing hockey skates using scrap steel that was left over at the plant from the manufacture of bicycles and automobiles, and subsequently began manufacturing other hockey gear.

In 1937, CCM acquired the Tackaberry brand made by a Manitoban named George Tackaberry. "Tacks" remained the company's signature skate until late 2006, when the Tacks line was replaced with the "Vector" line, then the "U+" line, and "RBZ" line, now the "Jetspeed" line. The "Tacks" line was later reintroduced in 2014.

=== Sport Maska era, 1983–present ===
CCM Inc. went bankrupt in 1982. In January 1983, the company was sold in two parts. The bicycle division was sold to Pro-Cycle Inc. of St. Georges-de-Beauce, Quebec, while the hockey division was sold to Sport Maska Inc., also of Quebec. Sport Maska been founded by Gérard Cóté in 1936 as G. C. Knitting Inc. In 1976, David Zunenshine (1929–2013) purchased the company and in 1979 renamed it after the Seigneurie de Maska.

The company entered the toy industry in 1988 through the acquisition of Coleco Industries and in 1990 when they acquired another financially troubled company, Buddy L Corp., a 70-year-old manufacturer of steel and plastic toy cars and trucks based in the United States.

Former CCM logo, replaced by the current one in 2007, although this one is still occasionally used on throwback merchandise.

==== SLM/The Hockey Company ownership, 1991–2004 ====
In 1991, Zunenshine created a Delaware holding company to consolidate his portfolio of businesses. The company was called SLM International Inc., an acronym for St. Lawrence Manufacturing. SLM purchased Kevin Sports Toys International Inc. (the maker of the Wayne Gretzky NHL hockey game), Norca Industries Inc. (a plastic toy manufacturer of such products as swimming pools, sleds, and sandboxes), and Innova-Dex Sports Inc. of Montreal (a bicycle helmet manufacturer).

SLM filed for Chapter 11 bankruptcy protection in 1995, selling off Buddy L and the SLM Fitness equipment business. The company emerged from bankruptcy protection in 1997 and reorganized. The company acquired Montreal-based Sports Holdings, Inc. in 1998, and became the world's top producer of hockey merchandise adding the brands Koho, Titan, Jofa, Canadien and Heaton. Titan and Canadien were well-known brands of wooden hockey sticks in the 1980s and 1990s, with Wayne Gretzky having used the Titan 2020 while playing with the Edmonton Oilers. Heaton was known for its goaltending equipment, which was used for years by Martin Brodeur as well as many other NHL goaltenders.

In 1999, SLM was renamed The Hockey Company.

==== Reebok and Adidas ownership, 2004–2017 ====
In June 2004, Reebok purchased The Hockey Company. All brands other than the CCM brand were retired and Reebok introduced its own RBK Hockey gear, later to be rebranded as Reebok Hockey. Reebok in turn was acquired by Adidas in 2005.

In the fall of 2013, Adidas created a new goaltending equipment line under the CCM brand name. Beginning in 2015, Adidas began phasing out the Reebok name from their hockey equipment lines, by creating equivalent or similar product lines under the CCM name.

==== Birch Hill ownership, 2017–2024 ====
In 2017, Adidas sold its hockey operations, where were held by Sport Maska Inc., to a Canadian private equity firm, Birch Hill Equity Partners, for around $100 million. In 2018 CCM hired a new CEO, Rick Blackshaw. Blackshaw told the media that "We have some nice momentum. We're seeking to make investment in product and product innovation and the brand.

==== Altor ownership, 2024–present ====
In October 2024, Altor Equity Partners of Stockholm purchased a majority share in Sport Maska from Birch Hill. In January 2025, Northleaf Capital Partners of Toronto had acquired the minority share in the company.

== Products and marketing ==
CCM manufactures a wide range of ice hockey equipment at all price points, from recreational to professional. One major rival is Bauer Hockey. CCM was one of the official licensees, sponsors, and on-ice suppliers of hockey equipment for the National Hockey League (NHL) until 2014. CCM has changed its logo twice, but continue to use all three.

NHL player George Parsons was forced to retire due to a career-ending eye injury in 1939. He then became involved with CCM hockey, helping to develop helmets and facial protection which would be safer for players. By early 1976, CCM had developed a hockey helmet complete with eye and face shield and lower face protector that was both approved by the Canadian Standards Association and endorsed by the Canadian Amateur Hockey Association.

Main endorsers of CCM players gear include Sidney Crosby, Alexander Ovechkin, Patrice Bergeron, Nathan MacKinnon, and Connor McDavid.

In recent decades, CCM has been one of the most used goalie pads in the NHL. This popularity was in large part due to CCM's partnership with Quebec-based goalie equipment company Équipements de gardien de but (EGB) (name stylized as 'Lefevre on products and marketing materials), a family business that began making hockey equipment in the 1970s. Some notable goalies that used CCM were Marc-André Fleury and Carey Price. In 2020, CCM and Lefebvre decided to end their partnership. Today CCM offers the Extreme Flex, Axis, and the youth YT Flex goalie products.

== Company histories ==
- Denison, Merrill. C.C.M.: The Story of the First 50 Years. Canada Cycle & Motor Company, 1949.
- McKenty, John A. Canada Cycle & Motor: The CCM Story. Epic Press, 2011.
