= Tom Pashby =

Canadian ophthalmologist (1915–2005)

Tom Pashby CM
- Born: March 23, 1915; Toronto, Ontario, Canada
- Died: August 24, 2005 (aged 90); Toronto, Ontario, Canada
- Education: University of Toronto
- Occupation: Ophthalmologist
- Known for: Canadian Standards Association chairman, sport safety advocate
- Awards: Canadian Sports Hall of Fame, Gordon Juckes Award

Thomas Joseph Pashby CM (March 23, 1915 – August 24, 2005) was a Canadian ophthalmologist and sport safety advocate. He spent 46 years improving the safety of hockey helmets to prevent injuries in ice hockey, by developing visors and wire face masks, and advocating for neck protection on goaltender masks. He served two decades as chairman of the Canadian Standards Association (CSA), setting standards for manufacturers of hockey and lacrosse helmets.

Pashby compiled Canadian data on hockey-related spinal cord injuries and visual impairment, while pushing for changes to ice hockey rules to prevent injuries. His work resulted in the Canadian Amateur Hockey Association (CAHA) making CSA-approved helmets mandatory in 1976, and the National Hockey League requiring helmets for all new players as of 1979. He succeeded in facial protection requirements for amateurs players in Canada, and rule changes against checking from behind enacted by Hockey Canada, USA Hockey, and the International Ice Hockey Federation.

Pashby received multiple awards, including the Ontario Hockey Association Distinguished Service Award, the Gordon Juckes Award from the CAHA, and was named man-of-the-year by The Hockey News in 1990. He was named a member of the Order of Canada in 1981, inducted into the builder category of Canada's Sports Hall of Fame in 2000, and was posthumously inducted into the Leaside Sports Hall of Fame.

== Early life ==
Thomas Joseph Pashby was born on March 23, 1915, in Toronto, Ontario. He was the only child of Norman and Florence Pashby, and attended Riverdale Collegiate Institute. He grew up in the Danforth and Pape area, and his family operated a butcher shop in East Danforth. While playing high school football, he recalled losing consciousness due to a concussion, despite feeling fine before falling on his face at the hospital.

Pashby graduated from the University of Toronto Faculty of Medicine in 1940, and received his certificate of registration with the College of Physicians and Surgeons of Ontario on August 22, 1940. He married Helen Christie in 1941, ten days before he enlisted in the Royal Canadian Air Force. During his World War II military service, he conducted eye examinations on prospective pilots, bombers and gunners; which led to his interest in ophthalmology.

== Medical career ==
Pashby earned ophthalmology specialist credentials from the Royal College of Physicians and Surgeons of Canada in January 1948. He established his own practice in Leaside in 1948, He later had offices in North Toronto and Don Mills, and treated patients at Toronto Western Hospital and Centenary Hospital. He also served a consulting physician for the Toronto Maple Leafs, was the senior staff ophthalmologist at the Hospital for Sick Children, and spent time as a professor at the University of Toronto.

In 1959, Pashby's son was playing minor ice hockey without a hockey helmet, and struck his head on the ice resulting in a concussion. Pashby then forbade his sons from playing without a helmet. When only cardboard helmets were available in Canada at the time, Bert Olmstead of the Toronto Maple Leafs helped Pashby import a polycarbonate helmet from Sweden.

Pashby then spent the next 46 years of his life to improve the safety of helmets to prevent injuries. He pioneered the development of visors and wire face masks to prevent eye injuries, and pushed for neck protection on goaltender masks. After Pashby improved the design and function of helmets, the Canadian Amateur Hockey Association (CAHA) made helmets mandatory in minor hockey as of 1965.

=== Canadian Standards Association ===
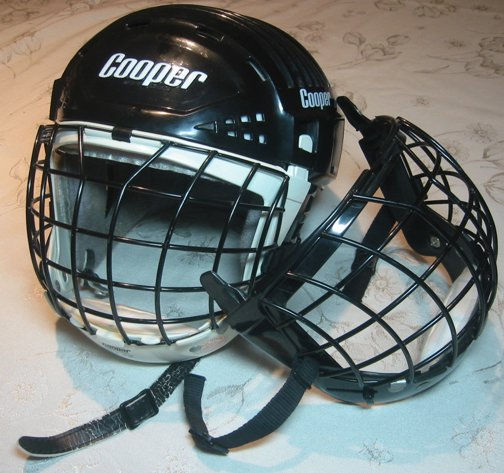
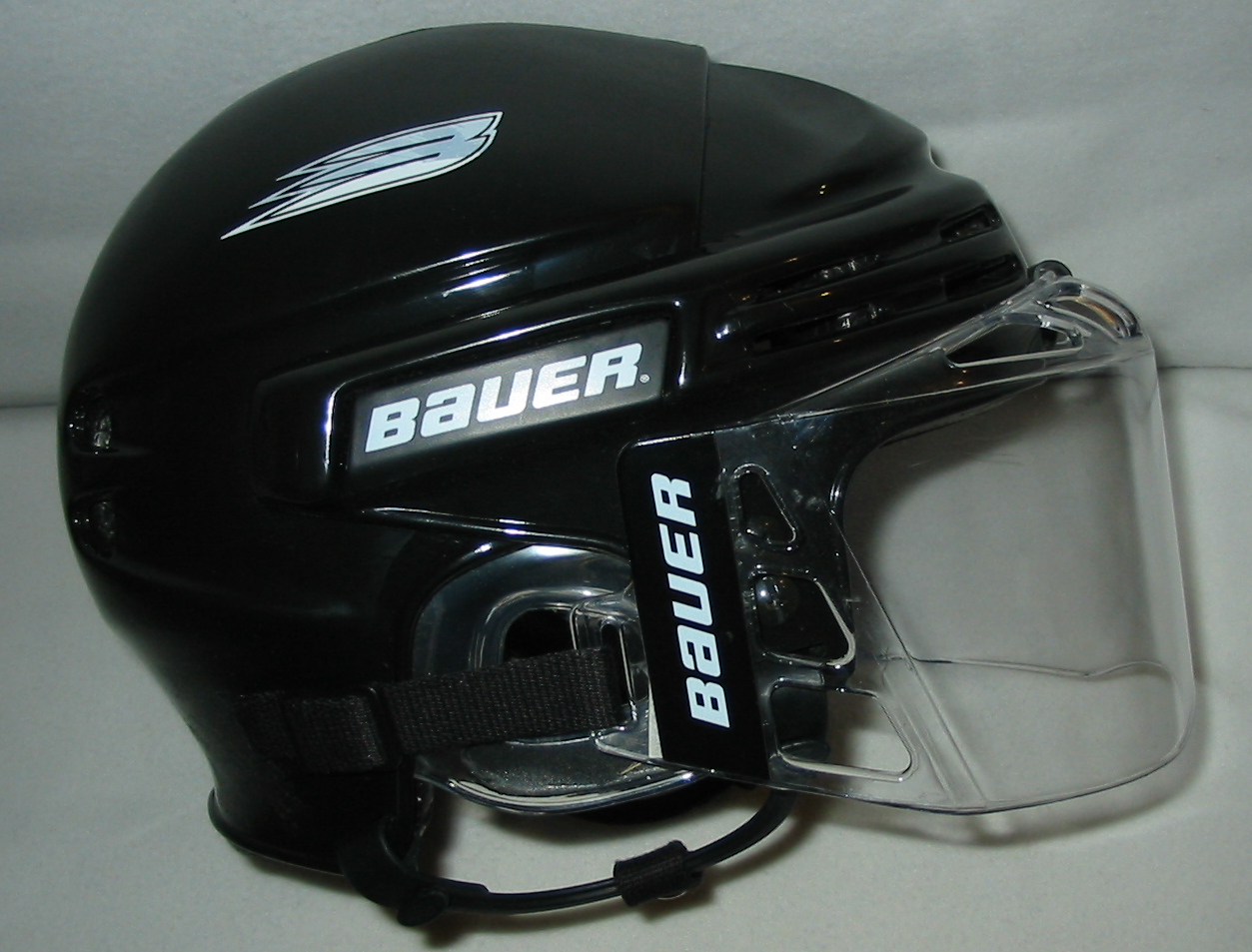
Hockey helmets with different types of face protection

Pashby began working with the Canadian Standards Association (CSA) in 1969, to assess the safety of helmets. In 1972, he conducted research on behalf of the Canadian Ophthalmological Society by writing to 700 ophthalmologists across Canada, and compiled data on hockey-related eye injuries.

During the 1972–73 season, Pashby reported there were 287 eye injuries in hockey players, including 20 blind eyes. During the 1974–75 season, he reported 258 eye injuries and 43 blinded eyes. He also reported that since 1972, there were 309 players at either the minor, junior or professional hockey levels who had lost eyesight, but that none of them wore a CSA-approved facemask.

Pashby became chairman of the CSA in 1975, serving for two decades to set standards for manufacturers of hockey and lacrosse helmets, while pushing for changes to ice hockey rules to prevent dangerous play and injuries. In 1976, the CAHA mandated that all amateur players were a CSA-approved helmet. The CSA soon set standards for full-face protection. By 1978, no players who wore a CSA-approved helmet and face mask had suffered a blinded eye. In 1979, helmets were made mandatory for all new players to the National Hockey League. In 1980, the CAHA mandated that players in all age groups wear facial protection.

=== Later career ===
Pashby continued to compile statistics for eye injuries, and began researching data spinal cord injuries. He reported 150 spinal cord injuries since 1976, and that 30 players were in wheelchairs as of 1990. He sought to reduce injuries in the game with a four-point plan; for existing rules to be enforced, for players to wear certified protective equipment, for the size of the ice hockey rink to be enlarged to international standards; and for education in prevention of injuries be given to players, coaches, and trainers. He also stressed the need to start education at an early age.

In 1985, Pashby was a member of the Committee for the Prevention of Spinal Cord Injuries Due To Hockey, and lobbied for rules to stop checking from behind. In 1986, the CAHA recommended that its branches adopt a no-checking-from-behind rule. In 1993, the CAHA mandated neck guards for players, and enacted rules against checking from behind.

In 1999, Pashby began an international push for rules against checking to the head. Such rules were enacted by the International Ice Hockey Federation and USA Hockey in 2001, and by Hockey Canada in 2002.

Pashby sat on the board of directors of the National Association of Safe Sports, which aimed to change behaviour in sport and reduce injuries. He retired as an ophthalmologist on June 1, 2001.

== Personal life ==
Pashby had two sons and one daughter. He moved to Leaside in 1945, where he lived for 60 years. He was a long-time coach for baseball and ice hockey teams in Leaside. He also sponsored local hockey and baseball teams for 40 years, and regularly spent summers along Georgian Bay and often vacationed at Walt Disney World.

Pashby's wife died from colon cancer in 2003. He died at his home on August 24, 2005, aged 90.

== Honours and awards ==
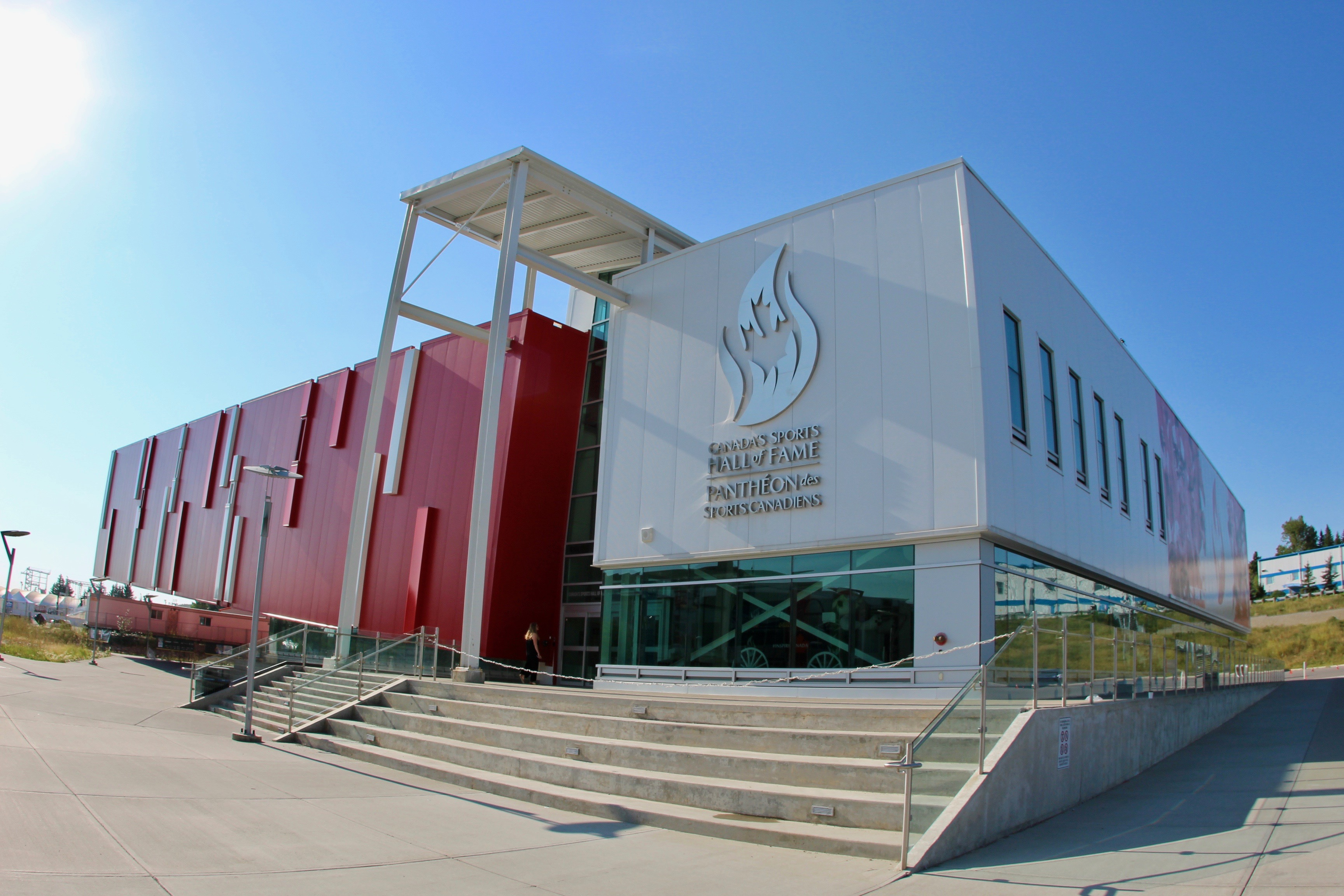
Canada's Sports Hall of Fame

Pashby received the Canadian Standards Association Award of Merit in 1979, and the Ontario Hockey Association Distinguished Service Award in 1980. He was named a member of the Order of Canada on June 22, 1981, for his contributions to eye protection and the "design and acceptance of protective equipment which has greatly reduced injury in sport". He was formally invested in the order by the Governor General of Canada during a ceremony on October 21, 1981.

In 1984, the CAHA recognized Pashby for contributions to amateur hockey in Canada with the Gordon Juckes Award. He received the Jean P. Carriere Award from the Standards Council of Canada in 1988, was one of two inaugural recipients of the Canadian Sport Safety Award from the Canadian Sports Spine and Head Injuries Research Centre in 1989. He was named man-of-the-year by The Hockey News in 1990, in recognition of his work to prevent injuries.

Pashby was granted an honorary Doctor of Science degree from the University of Waterloo in 1996. He was inducted into the builder category of Canada's Sports Hall of Fame, with the ceremony taking place on November 9, 2000. He was posthumously made one of the inaugural inductees into the Leaside Sports Hall of Fame in 2013.

== Legacy and impact ==
The Canadian Press referred to Pashby as, "[hockey]'s foremost safety pioneer for the last half-century". The Toronto Star wrote that, "were it not for the efforts of Pashby, that sensible equipment requirement might not have happened as soon as it did". Canada's Sports Hall of Fame states that, "in pioneering the development, marketing, and standardization of protective hockey helmets, Pashby has helped to prevent innumerable career-ending, even life-threatening head injuries". Hockey executive Frank Selke Jr. stated that, "thousands of kids have been saved from serious injuries because of [Pashby]", and that "unfortunately the masses don't know how much work [Pashby] has done".

Pashby was honoured with a dinner at the Regal Constellation Hotel on March 27, 1990, which included Don Cherry as a guest speaker. Proceeds from the event helped establish the Dr. Tom Pashby Sports Safety Fund. The fund was later chaired by his son, which sought to coordinate fundraising efforts to promote education and research in "the prevention of catastrophic injuries in sport and recreation".

Pashby had a personal collection of hockey helmets and masks, 50 of which were donated for display at the Hockey Hall of Fame, including the first helmet worn by his son.

The Hockey Development Centre of Ontario oversees the annual Dr. Tom Pashby Trainer of the Year Award, given for outstanding achievements in safety and risk management, and contributions to the certification program for hockey trainers in Ontario.

In 2017, the new ice rink at Leaside Gardens was named the Dr. Tom Pashby Play Safely Rink, following a CA$500,000 donation from the Dr. Tom Pashby Sports Safety Fund to promote safety in sport and recreation.
