= Jofa =

Swedish brand of ice hockey equipment

- Product type: Ice hockey equipment
- Current owner: Birch Hill Equity Partners
- Country: Sweden
- Introduced: 1926
- Website: Archived official website at the Wayback Machine (archived 2004-02-03)

Jofa is a Swedish brand of ice hockey equipment owned by Birch Hill Equity Partners through its portfolio company Sport Maska Inc. The brand originated in the company Jonssons Fabriker AB, later renamed Jofa AB, which was founded in Malung, Sweden in 1926 by Niss Oskar Jonsson (1909–2002). Jofa was a pioneer in the development of the plastic helmet, which in North America was worn most notably by Wayne Gretzky.

Since 1973, ownership of Jofa has changed continually. That year, Jonsson sold his company to Volvo, who then sold the company in 1985 to Karhu. In 1989, Jofa was sold to Karhu's Canadian arm, Karhu Canada Inc., later renamed the Sports Holdings Corporation. The SHC was acquired in late 1998 by SLM International, which in March 1999 was renamed The Hockey Company. In 2004, Reebok acquired The Hockey Company and its portfolio of brands, which included Jofa, CCM, Koho, Titan, Canadien, and Heaton. After the sale, all brands save CCM were phased out. A year later, Adidas purchased Reebok.

In 2017, Adidas sold its hockey operations, which were consolidated in the parent company Sport Maska Inc., to the private equity firm Birch Hill Equity Partners. Although CCM remains Sport Maska's flagship brand, a limited number of products are sold using the Jofa name.

== History ==
Niss Oskar Jonsson founded Jofa in 1926. It can be considered an offspring of the hide industry in Malung; the company's first products were made out of leftovers from the hide industry, and the first factory was located in an old tannery.

During World War II, Jofa grew because of large orders on tents and uniforms from the Swedish military.

Jofa was a subsidiary of Volvo between 1973 and 1985. In 1989, the company was bought by Karhu Canada Inc. In 1998, Jofa was acquired by SLM International, today known as CCM.

Niss Oskar Jonsson, the founder of Jofa, died in 2002 at the age of 92.

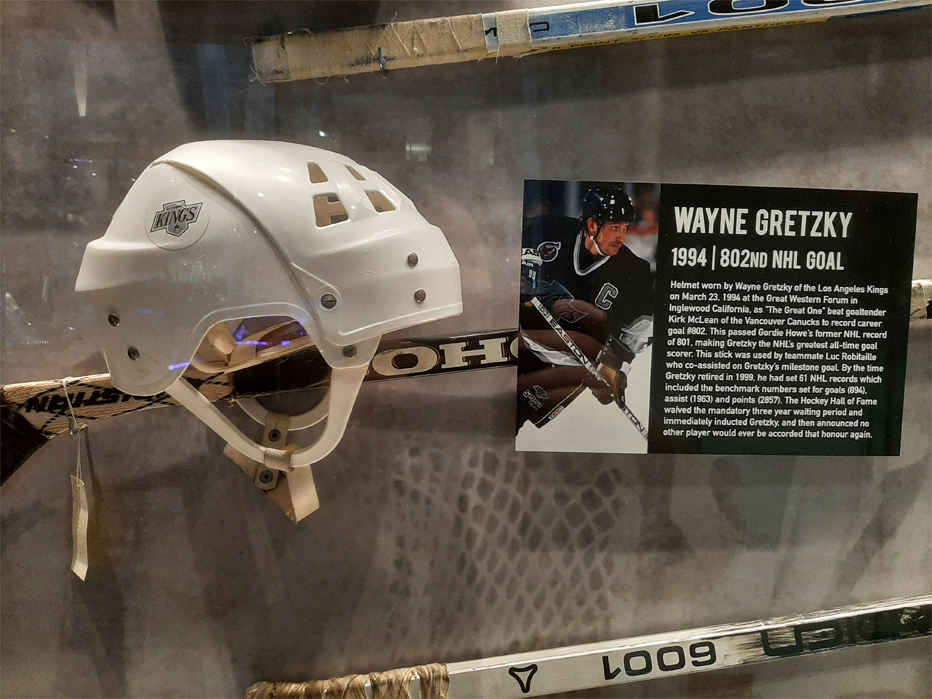
A Jofa helmet worn by Wayne Gretzky

Jofa's first step towards their most successful product was taken in 1963, when they started making hockey helmets. They have also manufactured other ice hockey equipment, such as ice skates and hockey sticks. Known NHL players who used Jofa helmets include such stars as Wayne Gretzky, Jaromír Jágr, Mario Lemieux, Mark Messier, Jari Kurri, Marty McSorley, Claude Lemieux, Mats Sundin, Markus Näslund, Peter Forsberg, Phil Housley, Teemu Selänne, Esa Tikkanen and twin brothers Daniel and Henrik Sedin. In roller hockey, Daniel Campoverde and other players also used Jofa helmets.

Reebok phased out the use of the Jofa brand on its hockey equipment in favour of its core CCM and Rbk brands. The Rbk brand was subsequently changed to Reebok Hockey.

Despite not producing hockey equipment since the 2004 Reebok buyout, Teemu Selänne was the only player in the NHL that continued to wear a Jofa helmet: a Jofa 366 with the Jofa logo blacked out due to an expired licensing agreement with the NHL. Since Selänne's retirement after the Anaheim Ducks' elimination in the 2014 Stanley Cup playoffs, there are no longer any NHL players that wear a Jofa helmet.
