= Hockey sock =

Sportswear

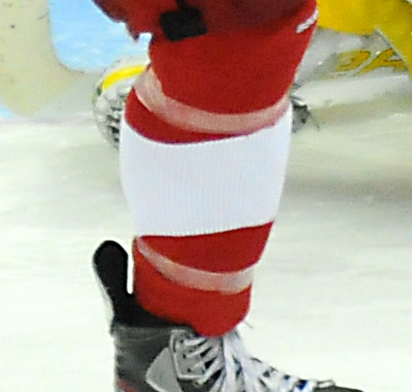
Cornell Big Red socks, with athletic tape

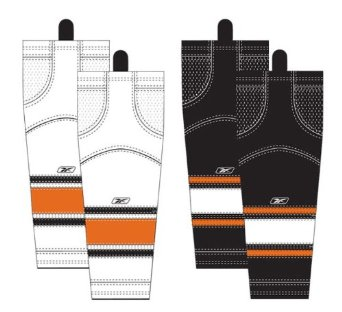
The home (light-colored socks) and away (dark-colored socks) of the Philadelphia Flyers

Hockey socks are ankle-to-thigh garments worn over protective gear by ice hockey players. They are form-fitting, and traditionally made of a cotton or synthetic rib-knit fabric.

Experiments have been made with a lightweight fabric sock, of material similar to that used in hockey jerseys, and most recently (mid-2000s) with a streamlined lightweight sock used by the U.S. Olympic and other international teams. Hockey socks should not be confused with hockey skate socks which are thin, traditional-style socks worn over the foot (inside the skate).

== Wearing ==
Hockey socks are held up either by a garter (old style) or attached to undershorts with Velcro tabs. Players usually keep their socks inside the upper ankle area of their skates.

Athletic tape is generally used below the knee to hold the sock in place, and sometimes at the ankle as well. Hockey socks, along with a jersey, are considered part of a team uniform under USA Hockey's rule 304(a) (2005–06 season) and are required as coverage for protective equipment (shinguards). Organized teams wear hockey socks in designated team colors, complementary to the team jersey.

== See also ==
- NHL uniform
- Ice hockey equipment
