= Hockey helmet =

Type of helmet used in ice hockey and similar sports

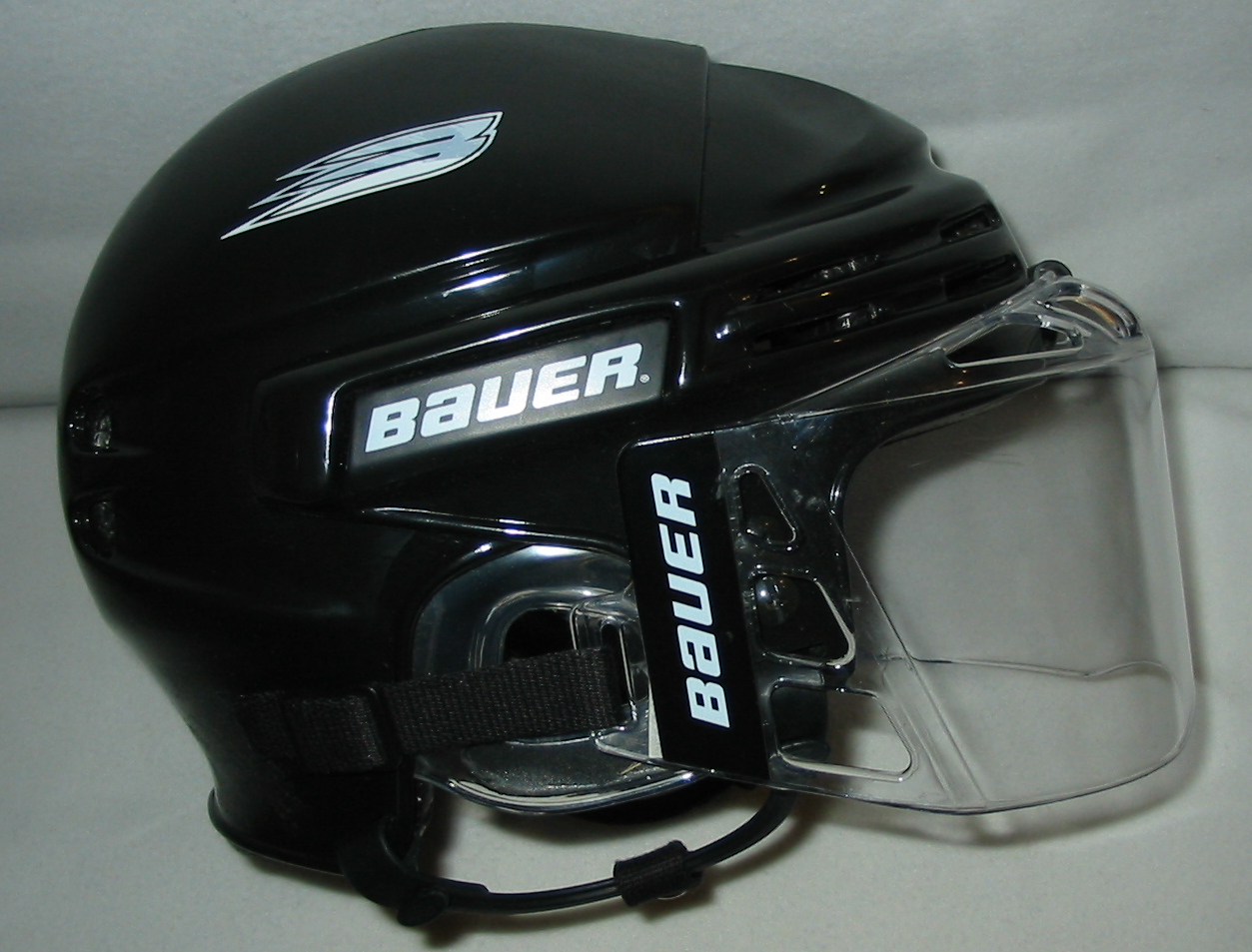
Bauer ice hockey helmet with shield and ear guards

Players and the referee (upper right) wear hockey helmets during play to protect their heads from injury from the flying puck and if they fall on the ice. Similarly, the goaltender mask worn by goaltender Braden Holtby protects his face as he fields the incoming shot.

A hockey helmet is worn by players of ice hockey, inline hockey, and bandy to help protect the head from potential injury when hit by the puck, sticks, skates, boards, other players, or the ice. The shell of a hockey helmet is generally made of a substance called vinyl nitrile that disperses force from the point of contact, while the liner may be made of either vinyl nitrile foam, expanded polypropylene foam, or other material to absorb the energy, to reduce the chances of concussion. Hockey helmets grip the head from inside by cupping the back of the head, or the occipital protuberance. Helmet manufacturers will have a chart that relates their helmet sizes to head measurements. On older models, the helmet size is adjusted by loosening the screws on the side to slide the front portion forward or back.

== Visors and shields ==
A visor or face shield in ice hockey is a device attached to the front of a helmet to reduce potential of injury to the face. Visors cover the upper half of the face, while full face shields cover the entire face. A series of eye injuries, most notably that to Greg Neeld (the first player to wear a visor in professional hockey) and Bryan Berard have led to a call from many to enforce their wearing. As of 2017, 94% of NHL players wear visors. Many other leagues around the world mandate the use of visors. Visors and shields, made of a high impact-resistant plastic, offer better overall vision than the wire cages available, which can obscure vision in certain areas. The face shield provides excellent straight ahead and peripheral vision, but does not provide as good air flow as a cage.

The American Hockey League, the top minor league in North America required all players to wear a visor prior to the start of the 2006–07 season. The NHL "strongly recommends" the use of visors. In 2013, the NHL began requiring all players with fewer than 25 games of experience to wear visors.

The hockey visor was first invented by Kenneth William Clay when he lost vision in his left eye to a high stick while playing for the Vanderhoof Bears. After a month in hospital in Vancouver, Clay created the first documented clear face shield in January 1964. The invention caused quite a stir, with announcers calling it a "fish bowl" and a "wrap-around windshield". While the original shield and helmet were lost in the fire that consumed the Vanderhoof Arena a few years later, the newspaper clippings still attest to the dates and facts.

== Full facial protection ==
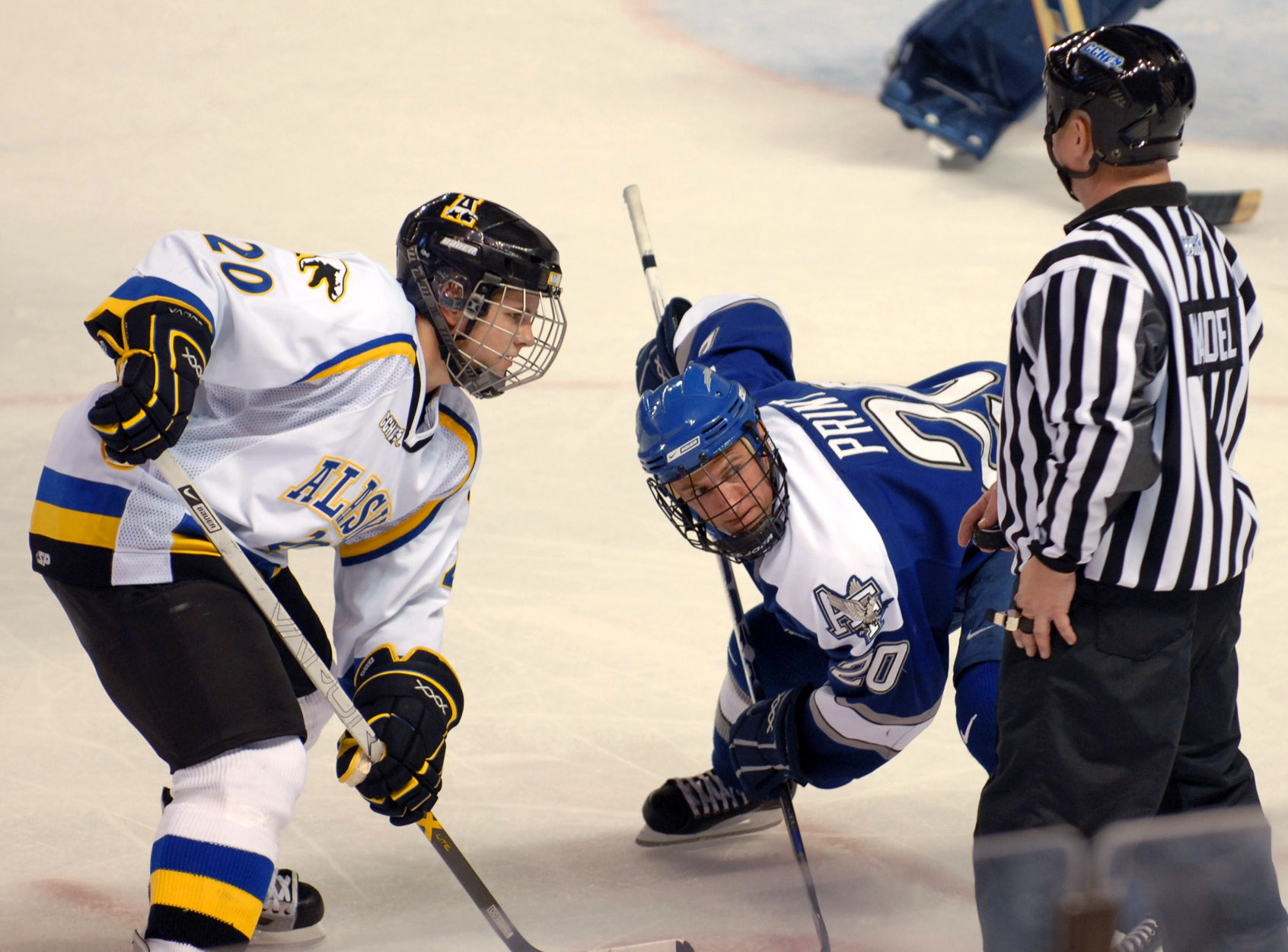
Two NCAA players wearing helmets with full cages.

A cage in ice hockey is a device attached to the front of a helmet to reduce potential of injury to the face. It consists of a metal or composite mesh that covers the entire face, although some half cages do exist (to protect the eyes while allowing full airflow). The bars, or cage, are spaced far enough apart to allow seeing through to the action but are close enough to stop pucks and sticks from getting through to injure the face. A hybrid variation of the full-face shield, which uses a polycarbonate face shield on the top half and either a polycarbonate or metal cage on its bottom half is also available.

Full facial protection is mandatory in many amateur leagues and in North America, full face cages, full shields, or shield and cage combination are mandatory in high school hockey, college hockey, and for all players under the age of 18.

In 2002, the British Journal of Sports Medicine published a study identifying the protection offered against concussions between the half-face shield and the full-face shield. The use of a full-face shield compared with half-face shield significantly reduced the playing time lost because of concussion, suggesting that concussion severity may be reduced by the use of a full-face shield.

== Helmet developers ==
Canadian ophthalmologist Tom Pashby spent 46 years improving the safety of helmets to prevent injuries. He served as president of the Canadian Standards Association (CSA) for two decades, which resulted in standards being set for helmets, rules enacted for wearing protections, and rules for safer play.

NHL player George Parsons was forced to retire due to career-ending eye injury in 1939. He became involved with CCM, helping to develop helmets and facial protection that would be safer for players. The hockey visor was first invented by Kenneth William Clay when he lost vision in his left eye to a high stick while playing for the Vanderhoof Bears. After a month in hospital in Vancouver, Clay created the first documented clear face shield in January 1964. The invention caused quite a stir, with announcers calling it a "fish bowl" and a "wrap-around windshield". While the original shield and helmet were lost in the fire that consumed the Vanderhoof Arena a few years later, the newspaper clippings still attest to the dates and facts. By early 1976, CCM had developed a hockey helmet complete with eye and face shield and lower face protector that was both approved by the CSA and endorsed by the Canadian Amateur Hockey Association.

== Helmets in the National Hockey League ==
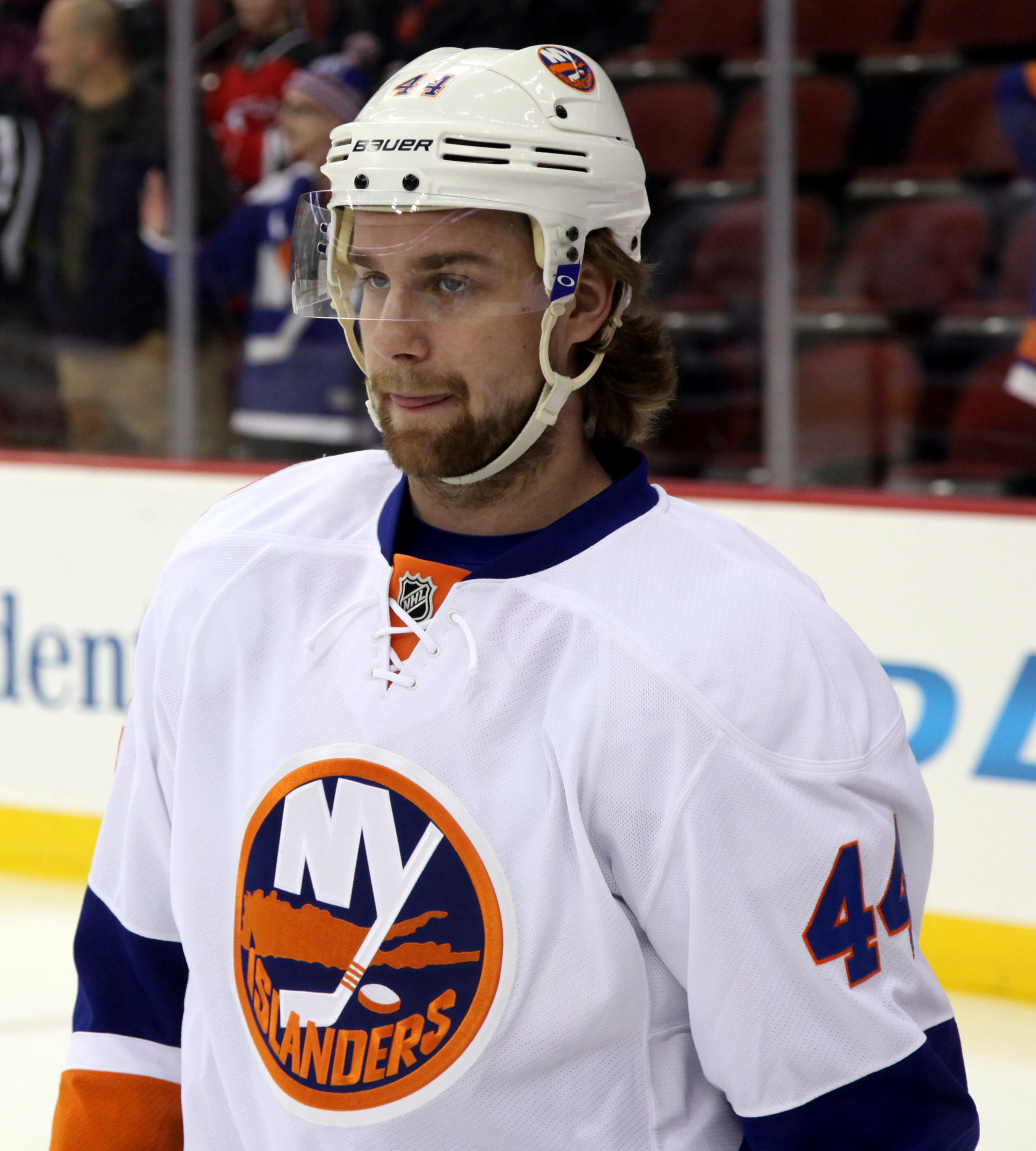
Defenseman Calvin de Haan wearing a helmet and visor

The first player to regularly wear a helmet for protective purposes was George Owen, who played for the Boston Bruins in 1928–29. In 1927, Barney Stanley presented a prototype of a helmet at the NHL's annual meeting. It was quickly rejected.

Helmets appeared after the Ace Bailey–Eddie Shore incident on December 12, 1933, as a result of which Bailey almost died and Shore suffered a severe head injury. After that, Art Ross engineered a new helmet design and when the Boston Bruins took to the ice in a game against the Ottawa Senators, most of the players donned the new helmet. Most Bruins players didn't wear the helmet after the game, with the exception of Eddie Shore, who wore it the rest of his career. In the 1930s, the Toronto Maple Leafs players were ordered to add helmets to their equipment. A few minutes into the first game with the new helmets, the popular King Clancy famously flung his off. The helmets were generally unpopular with fans, media, and other players. A few players, such as Des Smith, Bill Mosienko, Dit Clapper, and Don Gallinger continued to don helmets.

During the Original Six era, Maurice Richard and Elmer Lach briefly wore helmets. Jack Crawford wore a helmet to hide his bald head and Charlie Burns wore one to protect the metal plates in his head from an injury incurred in playing junior ice hockey, predating his NHL career.

The death of Bill Masterton from a brain injury in a January 13, 1968, game between the Minnesota North Stars and Oakland Seals started to change perceptions surrounding helmets. Helmet use began to gradually increase during the 1970s, with Ted Green being the first Bruins player since Shore to wear one. He began in the 1970–71 NHL season and continued until his retirement from pro hockey in 1979. The 1972 Summit Series showcased an entirely helmet clad Soviet Union team, with Paul Henderson, Stan Mikita, and Red Berenson being the only Canadians to sport a helmet. Usage increased to the point that 70% of NHL players were wearing them by 1979. At this point, every goalie had been wearing a helmet and a mask for almost half a decade.

In August 1979, the then-President of the National Hockey League (NHL), John Ziegler, announced that protective helmets would become mandatory for incoming players in the NHL. "The introduction of the helmet rule will be an additional safety factor," he said. The rule allowed players who signed professional contracts prior to June 1, 1979, who were already not wearing helmets to continue to do so for the rest of their careers provided a liability waiver was signed, if they so desired.

Nearly a decade later, in 1988, the NHL also made helmets mandatory for its officials; like the ruling for players, any official that was not wearing a helmet before the ruling could also go helmetless if he so desired.

With the new rulings in place, the last player to play without a helmet was Craig MacTavish, who played his final game during the 1996–97 season for the St. Louis Blues.

Following the players, the last referee to call a game without wearing a helmet was Mick McGeough, who began wearing a helmet during the 2006–07 season, just before he retired at the end of the 2007–08 season.

== Brands ==
- Bauer Hockey (including Mission Hockey, Itech, and Cascade)
- Easton Hockey
- Oakley
- CCM (including Koho/Jofa)

== See also ==
- Shock detector
