= Karhu (sports brand) =

Finnish sports equipment company

- Formerly: Oy Urheilutarpeita
- Type: Besloten Vennootschap (Limited Liability Company)
- Industry: Sports equipment, textile
- Founded: 1916; 110 years ago in Helsinki
- Headquarters: Netherlands
- Products: Sneakers, apparel
- Parent: Karhu Holding B.V.
- Website: karhu.com

Karhu is a Dutch-owned sports equipment company based on an originally Finnish brand, focused on running. Originally established as "Oy Urheilutarpeita" in 1916, it was renamed "Karhu" (meaning bear in Finnish) four years later. Karhu's line of products includes running/lifestyle footwear and apparel. In past years, Karhu also manufactured skis. In 2008, the company was sold to a group of investors organised under "Karhu Holding B.V.". The investors responsible for operations are Dutch/American businessman Huub Valkenburg and the Arese family from Italy. Karhu Holding B.V. is based in the Netherlands and is run by Emanuele Arese.

Karhu is renowned for having implemented the three stripes trademark, which was then sold to German company Adidas in 1952.

== History ==
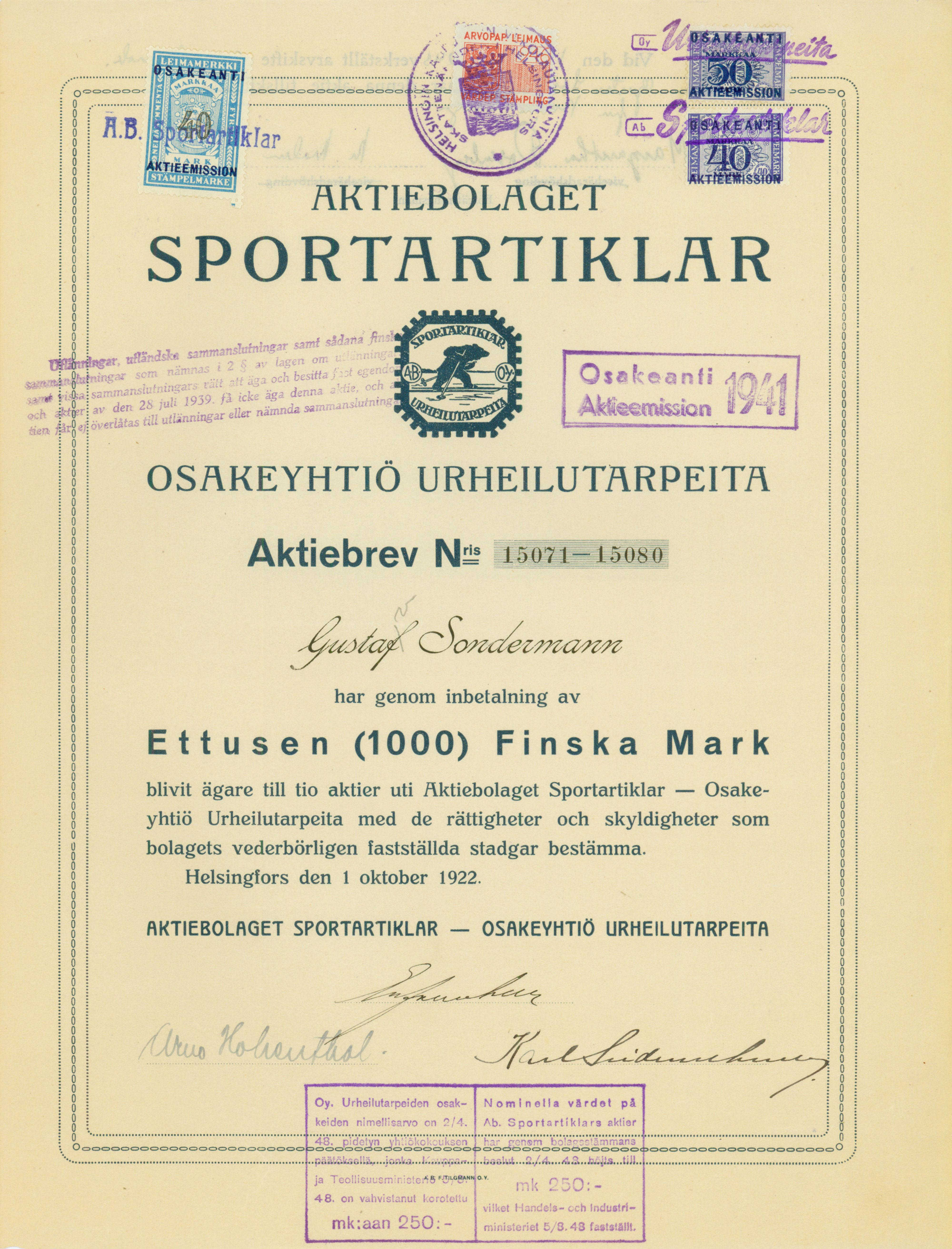
Share of the Oy Urheilutarpeita, issued 1. October 1922

The company was established in Helsinki, Finland, in 1916, as "Oy Urheilutarpeita". In 1920, the company was renamed "Karhu", adopting a bear as its logo. In addition to the discuses and javelins that were Karhu's main products, the company also produced running shoes and track spikes.

The Karhu brand featured prominently at the 1920 Antwerp Olympic Games, where Finnish athletes took all three medals in javelin using Karhu javelins, and the "Flying Finns" took five gold medals on the track wearing Karhu spikes. Four years later, at the 1924 Summer Olympics in Paris, Paavo Nurmi won five gold medals in track events "wearing a conspicuous pair of white Karhu running spikes".

In the 1930s, Karhu's production expanded to include cross-country and ski jumping skis. During the Winter War and Continuation War, from 1939–1945, Karhu produced snow-camouflage suits, tents and skis for the Finnish military.

In 1952, Karhu sold the "three stripes" trademark it had been using to a then little-known German brand Adidas for the equivalent of 1,600 euros and two bottles of whiskey. In the 1960s Karhu began to use the M-logo in its place. The 'M' (that comes from "Mestari" which means "master" or "champion" in Finnish) is still in use on Karhu shoes.

During successive years, Karhu's innovations included the first use of nylon and air cushioning in running shoes. The 1960s also saw the development of Karhu's line of pesäpallo (Finnish baseball) equipment. In 1966, the Karhu company changed its name to "Oy Urheilu Karhu Sport Ab". By 1968, Karhu launched the Trampas, a shoe that came in two versions, one for trainers and the other for casual wear. The shoe was a great success, being used by the Finnish Olympic team, being praised by Arthur Lydiard, who called them "the best training shoe in the world". A new name change came in 1972 to "Karhu-Titan", reflecting its strong ice hockey equipment brands Titan (sticks), Koho (protective and goaltender equipment) and Jofa (helmets).

Operations were launched by Doug Barbor in Canada in Cowansville, Quebec, in 1976 to market and sell cross-country and backcountry ski products under the Karhu label in North America.

In 1982, Karhu launched the "Albatross" shoe model, one of the best-selling sneakers of that time. Two years later, the company launched the "Harlem Air" basketball shoe. In 1986, a collaboration of research and design with the University of Jyväskylä led to the development of "Fulcrum technology". A year later, Karhu acquired American hiking boot brand Merrell and sold it to Wolverine World Wide in 1997. In the same year, Karhu-Titan's name changed to Karhu Sporting Goods. Karhu also sold its hockey division.

In 2006, the Karhu North American Nordic and Telemark brand and Line Ski Businesses were acquired from Burlington, Vermont-based Trak Sports USA by K2 Sports. According to the K2 press release the majority of Karhu and Line’s operations would relocate to the K2 Sports headquarters on Vashon Island, Washington.

In 2008, Karhu Sporting Goods sold the Karhu brand to Karhu Holding B.V., a Dutch holding company led by Huub Valkenburg and Jay Duke, leading to a dispute between KSG and Karhu Holding.

In 2009, Cowansville's Trak Sports manufacturer closed down after K2 Sports moved the Karhu and Line Ski Businesses production to Washington State.

Karhu signed an agreement with Italian Paralympic Committee to dress athletes competing at the 2016 Summer Paralympics in Rio de Janeiro.

== Sponsoring ==
Karhu was the sponsor of the 1971 European Athletics Championships and more than 50 years later Karhu will be the official supplier of 2024 European Athletics Championships. In 2024-25 the brand sponsored "Atletica Virtus Lucca" an important athletic society in Italy.

== Products ==
=== Shoes ===
Karhu's main line of running shoes is based on its "Fulcrum Technology", which has been developed in cooperation with the University of Jyväskylä since the 1980s. The line includes several models for both men and women, intended to suit different types of pronation and training, off-road or trail running shoes and racing needs. In early 2000s, Karhu launched the M-Series, which earned popularity at the time, but was discontinued when Karhu was sold to foreign investors in 2008. In 2009, the Karhu Fulcrum Strong model of running shoe was awarded "Best Debut" by Runner's World magazine. In 2017, Karhu partnered with American specialty running retailer Fleet Feet to be the exclusive U.S. retailer of its running line.

Karhu also released a line of casual shoes called Karhu Originals, a range of retro inspired footwear, which were nominated for "Sneaker of the Year 2005" at the Global Sports Style Awards in Munich in 2005.

=== Skis ===
Market share of Karhu skis sold in Finland was over 25% each year, but greatly reduced over past two decades by the fact the same factory also supplies Yoko and Järvinen branded skis and overall ski production in Kitee went down to about one-tenth due to national and global demand decline. The major export markets for Karhu skis were Sweden, Japan, Estonia and Germany. Production of Karhu skis was briefly leased and Sporten (Cz, Now Kästle Cz) made the Karhu skis between 2013 and 2015, but the license agreement was resigned with Kitee Ski oy (known until 2012 as Karhu Ski oy) in Kitee, now KSF Sport Oy, Finland.

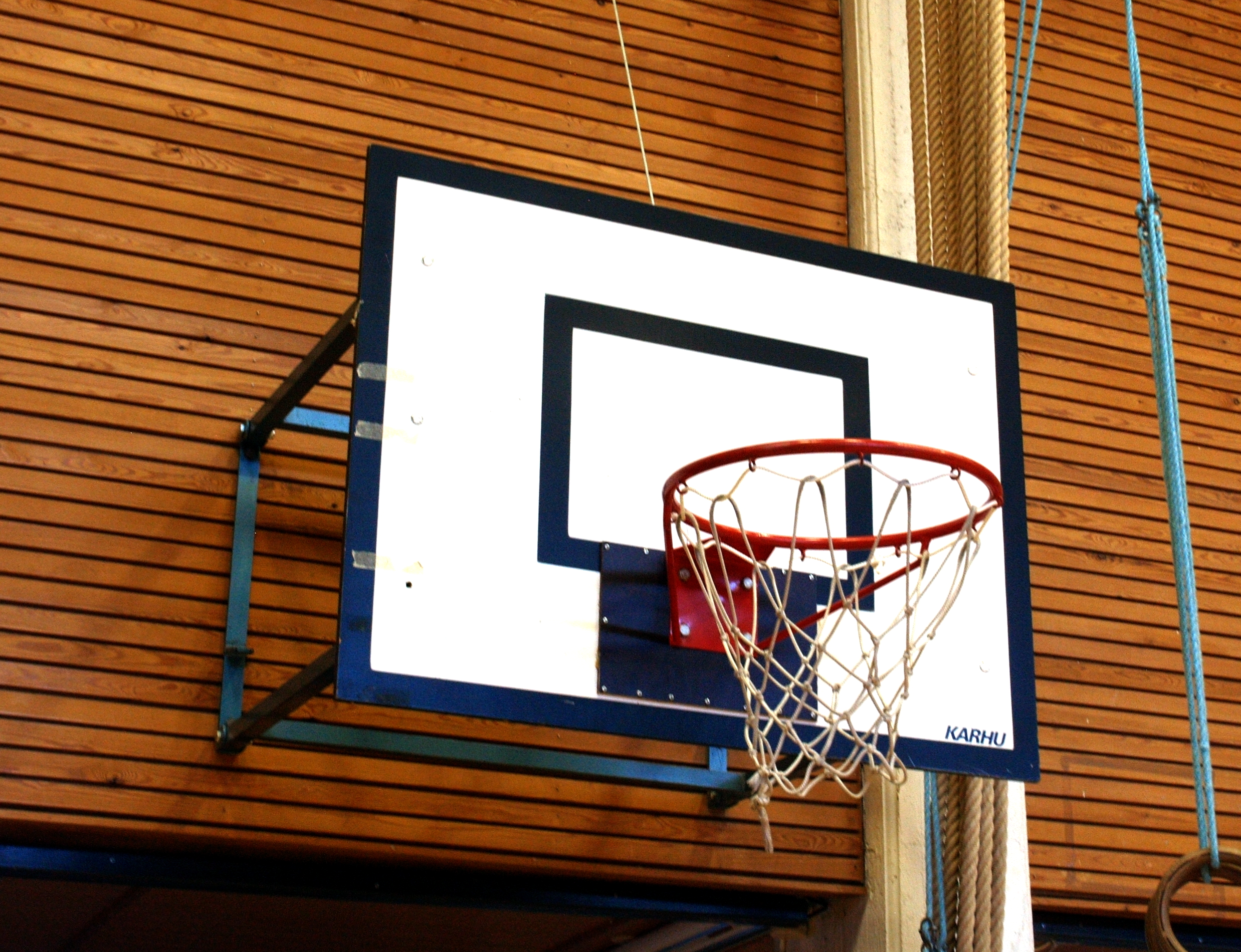
Karhu Basketball goal

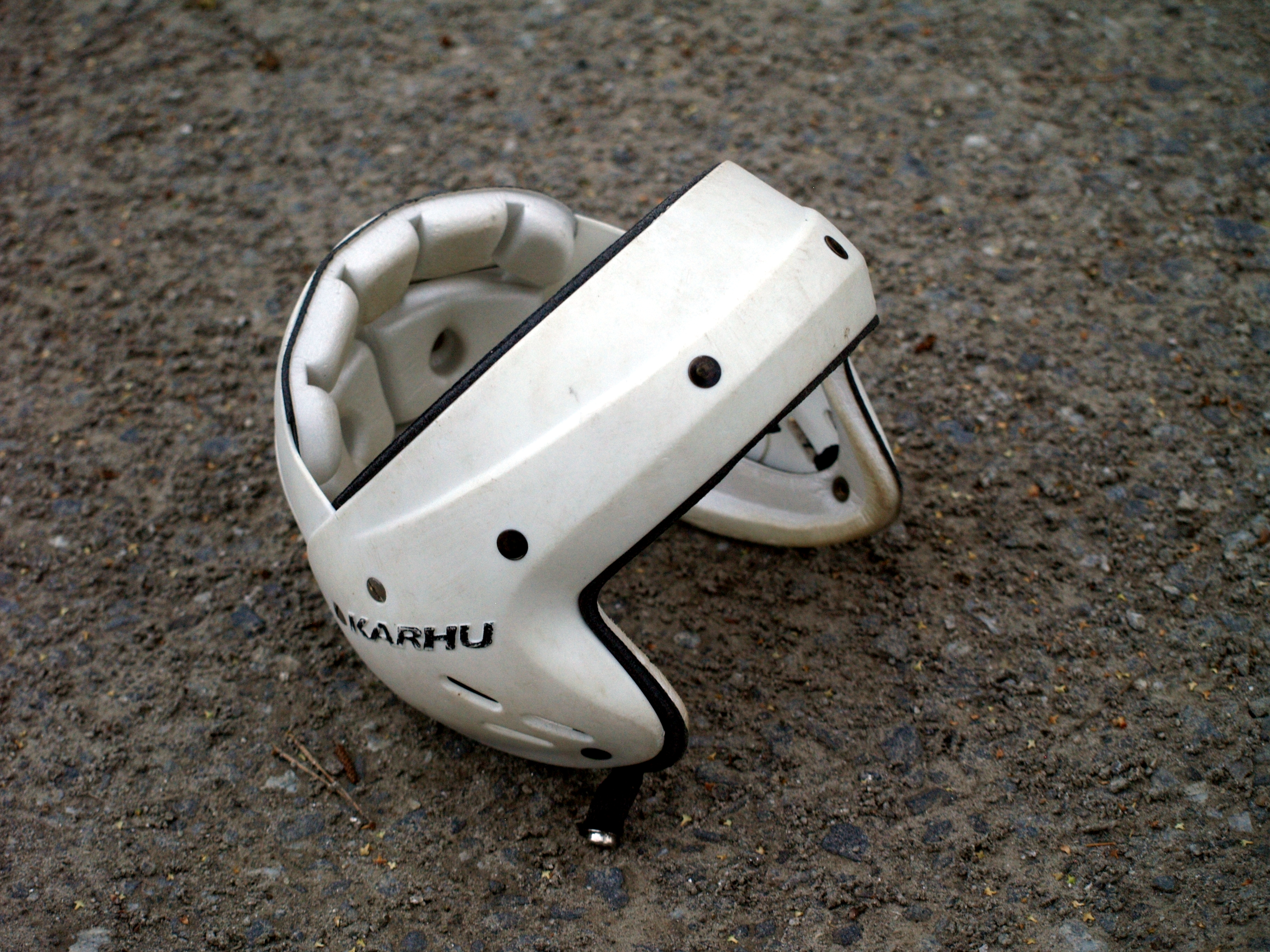
Karhu Pesäpallo helmet

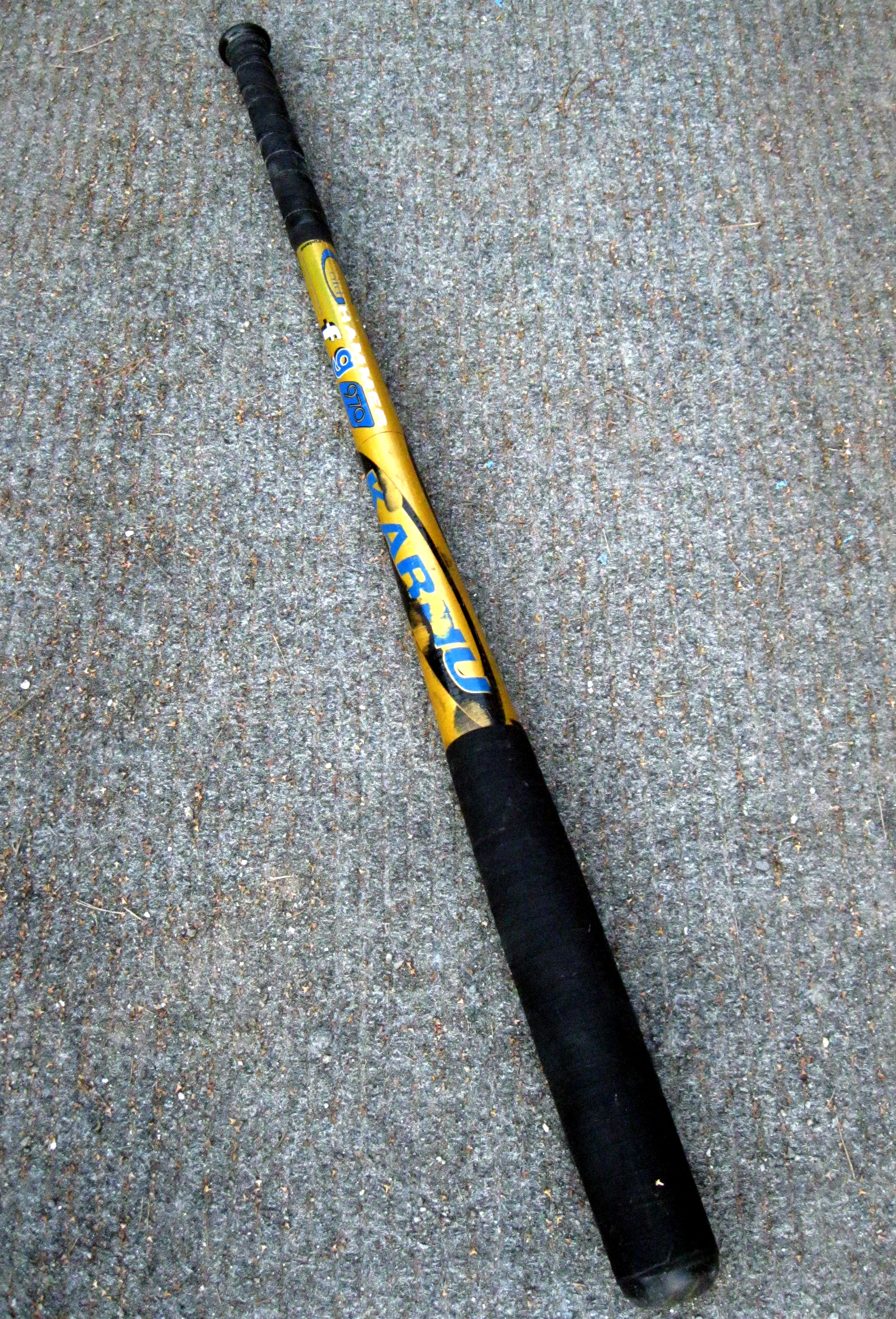
Karhu Goldhammer FG-970 -pesäpallo bat.

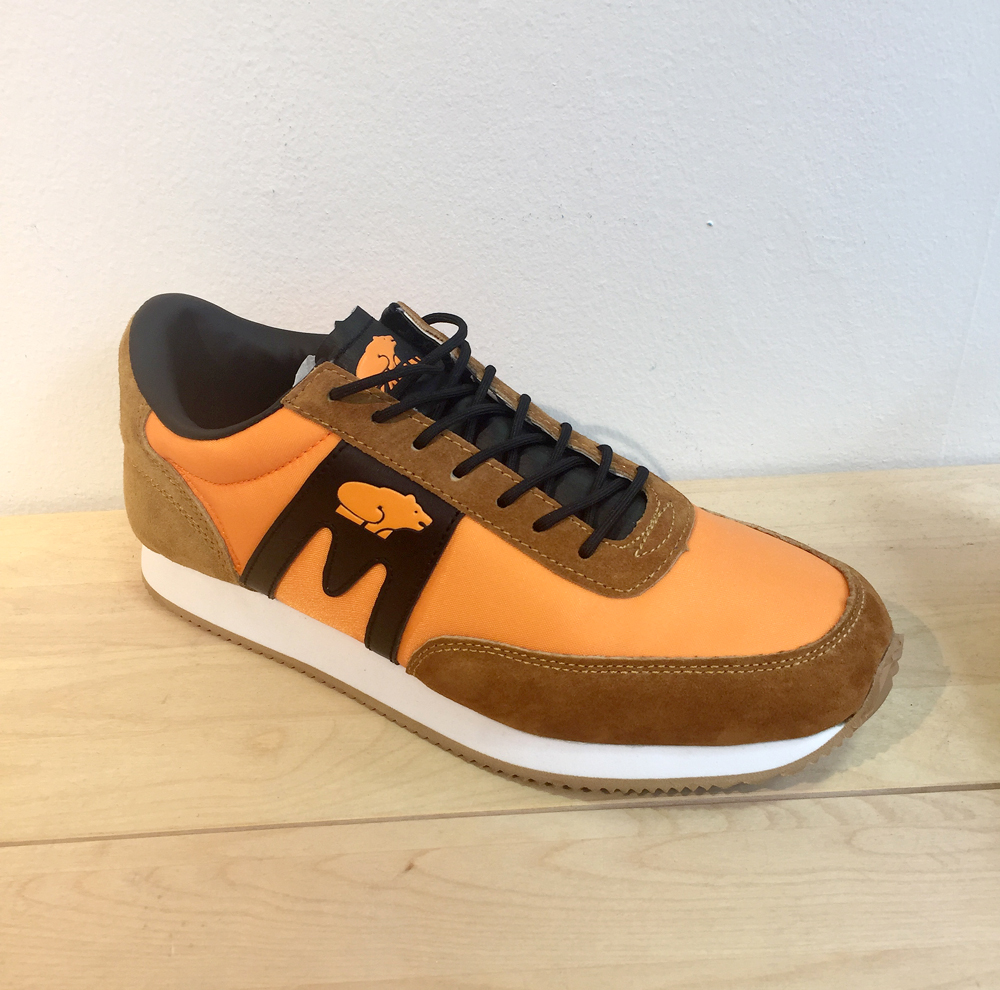
Karhu shoe

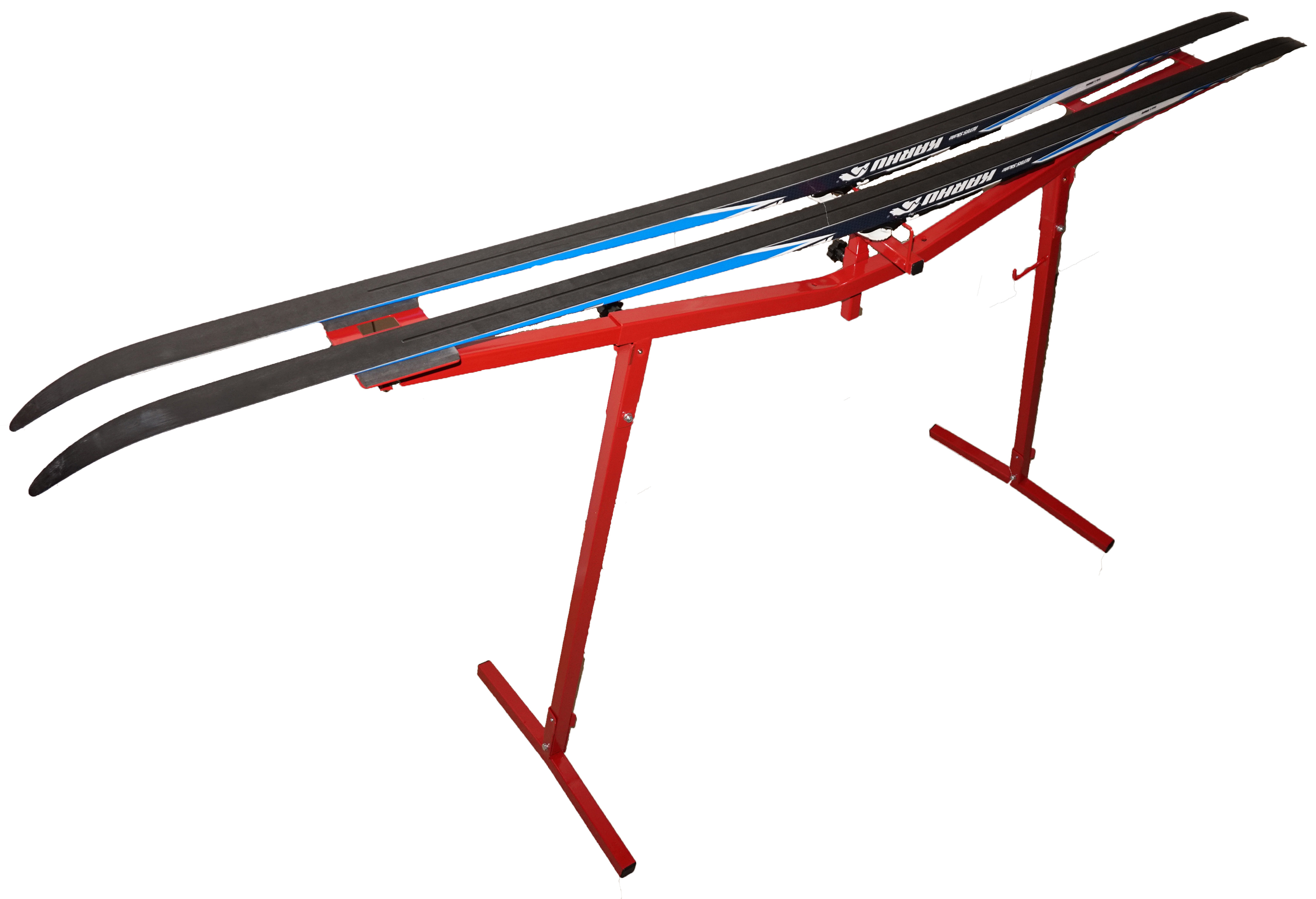
Karhu skis
