= George Tackaberry =

George Edwin Tackaberry (May 6, 1874 - November 19, 1937) was a Canadian boot maker remembered today as the inventor of a long-lived brand of ice hockey skate sold by CCM called the CCM "Tack". (CCM "Tacks".)

== Early life ==
Tackaberry apprenticed as a shoemaker in his home town of Dresden, Ontario. He moved to Brandon, Manitoba in 1892 with his wife Helen where he specialized in orthopaedic shoes for the handicapped.

== Work with CCM ==
Tackaberry's neighbour Joe Hall, a professional hockey player, complained to Tackaberry about his hockey boots not lasting him the entire season without collapsing and in 1905 commissioned Tackaberry to make him a new, more durable pair of boots. Combining the natural strength of kangaroo leather with a reinforced toe, Tackaberry had the winning combination. The following year in 1906, Tackaberry was flooded with orders from Hall's team members, the business took off from there and this specific style of boot became known as the Tackaberry.

With his passing in 1937, Tackaberry's wife Helen sold the patent to CCM. The boots, commonly called "CCM Tacks", remained CCM's primary skate until 2006, and are still on the market, and popular, today.
