= Altor Equity Partners =

Private equity company

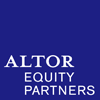
- Type: Private
- Industry: Private equity
- Founded: 2003
- Founder: Harald Mix
- Headquarters: Stockholm, Sweden
- Products: Leveraged buyout, Growth capital
- Total assets: €8.3 billion
- Number of employees: 100+
- Website: www.altor.com

Altor Equity Partners is a private equity firm focused on leveraged buyout and growth capital investments in Sweden, Denmark, Finland, Norway and the DACH region.

== History ==
Altor Equity Partners was founded in 2003 by a team led by Harald Mix, formerly a partner at Industri Kapital, another Nordic-focused private equity firm. The firm is based in Stockholm, Sweden.

As of 2015, the firm has raised approximately €6.2 billion since inception across three funds. The firm completed fundraising for its first investment vehicle, the Altor 2003 Fund in May 2003 with €650 million of investor commitments. Altor Fund II was closed in March 2006 €1.2 billion of capital and Altor Fund III closed in August 2008 with €2.0 billion of commitments. Altor closed its fourth fund in July 2014, also with €2 billion in commitments. Altor closed its fifth fund in 2019, with €2.5 billion in commitments.

== Notable investments ==
In 2006, Altor purchased Norwegian outdoor clothing retailer Helly Hansen from Investcorp for an undisclosed amount. In 2012, the firm sold 75 percent of the acquired company to the Ontario Teachers’ Pension Plan for about $326 million, reportedly four times the original acquisition price.

The firm bought the French ski manufacturer Skis Rossignol from a group led by Macquarie in July 2013 for an undisclosed amount.

In August 2021, Altor acquired a majority stake in Swedish video game publisher Raw Fury for an undisclosed price. Four years later, the firm acquired a majority stake in Evac, the Finnish clean technology firm backed by Bridgepoint Group for €600 million.

== Other sources ==
- Meehan, Caroline (3 June 2003). "Harald Mix's debut buy-out fund overshoots target". Financial News.
