= Koho (ice hockey) =

Finnish brand of ice hockey equipment

- Product type: Ice hockey equipment
- Current owner: Birch Hill Equity Partners
- Country: Finland
- Introduced: 1964
- Website: Archived official website at the Wayback Machine (archived 2004-02-24)

Koho is a Finnish brand of ice hockey equipment owned by Birch Hill Equity Partners through its portfolio company Sport Maska Inc. Koho equipment was made originally by the company Koho-tuote Oy, which was founded in 1964 in Forssa, Finland by Kari Aro (1935–2003).

Since the sale of the Koho company in 1974, the brand has gone through numerous ownership changes. Currently it is owned by the Quebec company Sport Maska, whose portfolio of brands also includes CCM, Jofa, Titan, Canadien, and Heaton.

== History ==
Koho-tuote was purchased in 1974 by Amer, which continued to manufacture Koho products. In 1986, Amer sold its Koho and Canadien brands to Karhu, which already owned the Titan and Jofa brands. In 1987, Karhu's hockey operations were sold to its partially owned Canadian arm, Karhu Canada Inc., later renamed the Sports Holdings Corporation. In late 1998, the SHC was acquired by the holding company SLM International, which owned the CCM brand through its subsidiary Sport Maska. Then, in March 1999, SLM was renamed The Hockey Company, reflecting its portfolio of hockey equipment brands. In 2004, Reebok purchased The Hockey Company, then a year later, was itself purchased by Adidas. During the Reebok and Adidas ownership, all brands except CCM were phased out. In 2017, Adidas sold its hockey operations, which were still consolidated in the subsidiary Sport Maska, to the private equity firm Birch Hill Equity Partners for $110 million. Sport Maska's primary brand remains CCM, though it produces Koho-branded equipment and apparel occasionally.
