= Elbow pad =

Protective padded gear

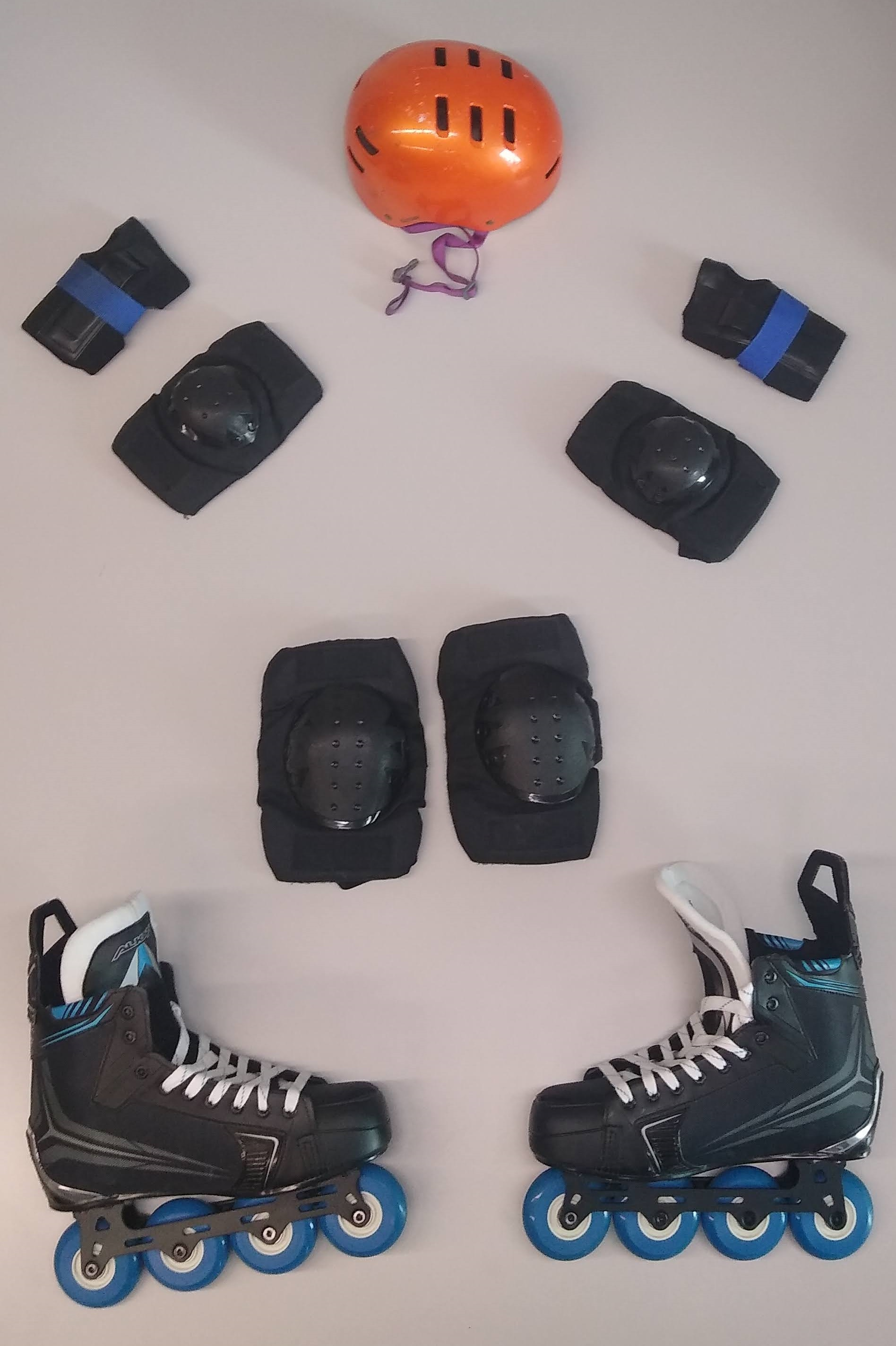
Typical In-line skating protective gear includes helmet, elbow pads, wrist guards, and knee pads.

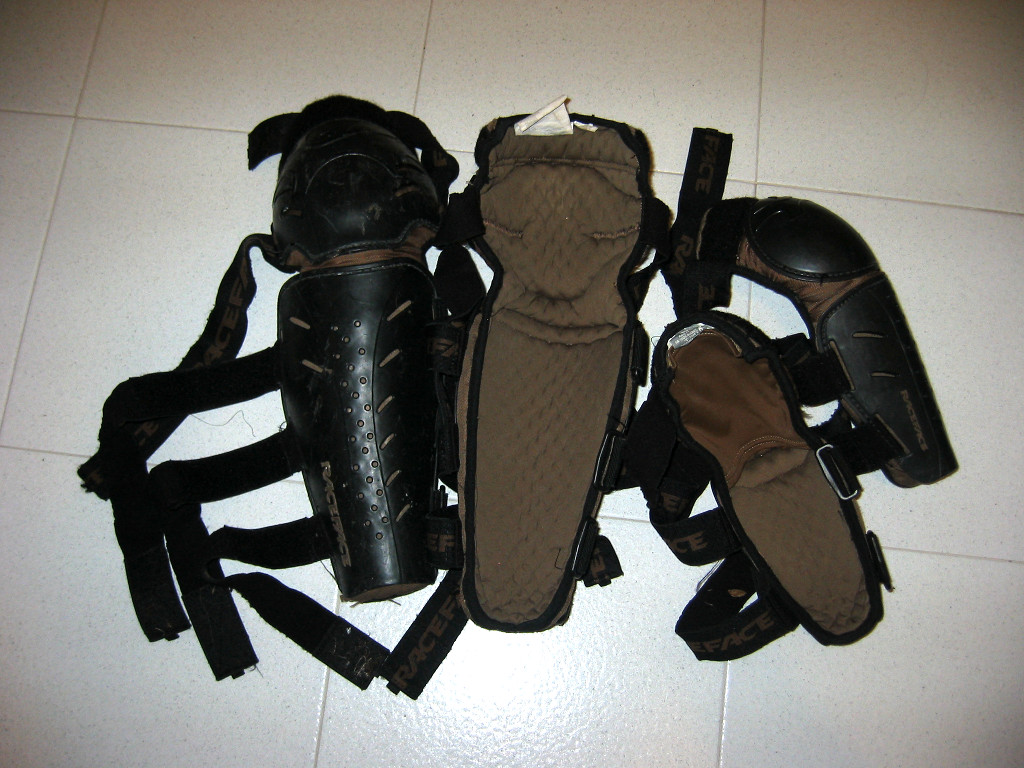
Mountain biking knee pads with attached shin guards (left), and elbow pads with attached forearm guards (right).

Elbow pads are protective padded gear worn on the elbows to protect them against injury during a fall or a strike.

Elbow pads are worn by many athletes, especially hockey players, cyclists, roller skaters, skateboarders, volleyball players, skiers and wrestlers. Wrestlers sometimes use elbow pads as weapons by slapping their opponents, or take it off for an Atomic Elbow.

Soldiers also often wear elbow pads.

== See also ==
- Knee pads
- Shoulder pads (sport)
