= Hockey pants =

Type of sport pants

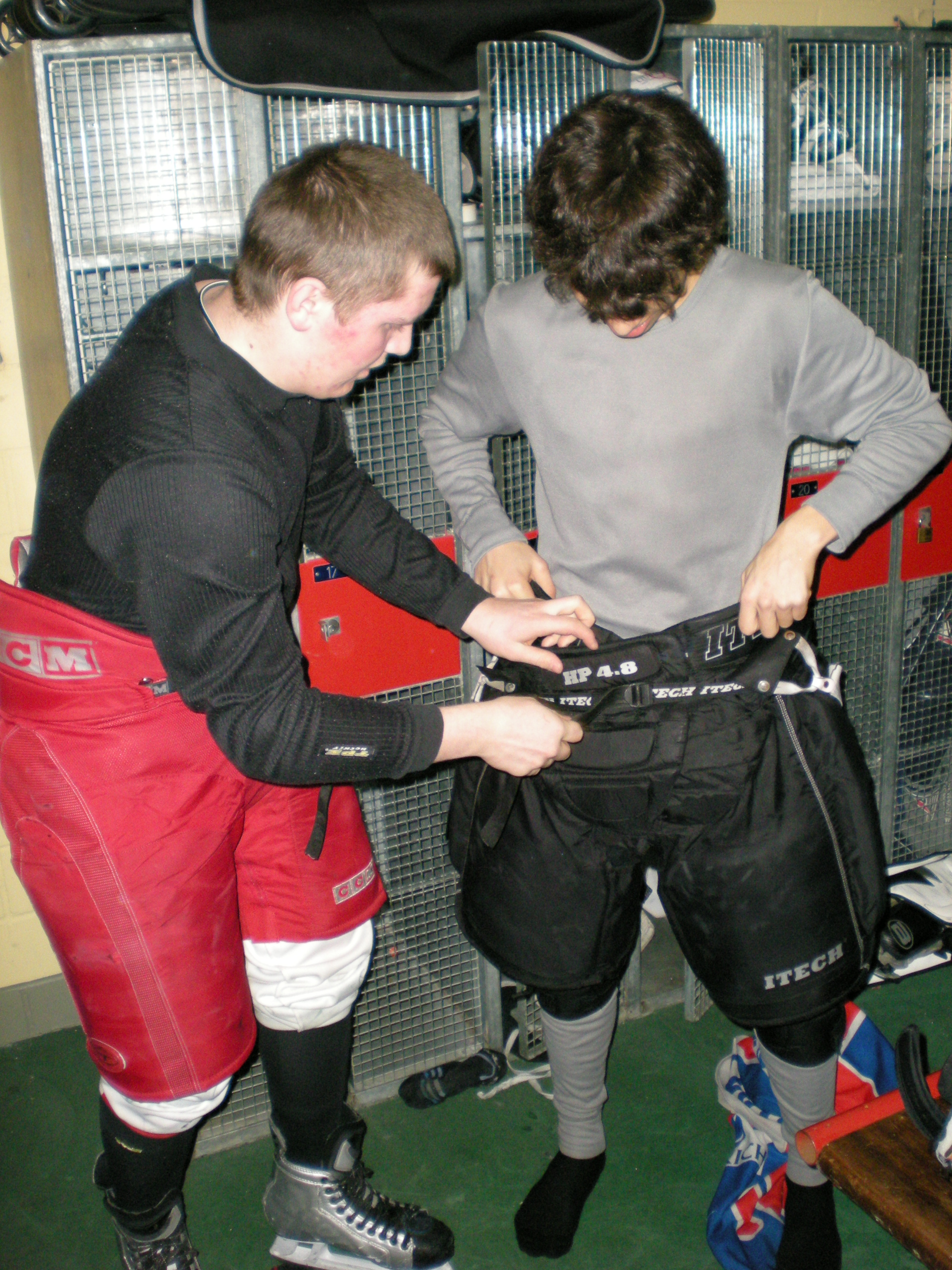

Hockey pants are knee-to-waist protective gear for ice hockey or roller hockey players. The pants carry a variety of padding depending on whether they are worn by goaltenders or skaters (forwards and defenders), and also on the manufacturer.

The pants are traditionally a one-piece garment with a lace-up fly augmented by a strap belt. Sometimes, they are additionally held up by suspenders (particularly in the case of goalie pants).

Hockey pants are also called "breezers" in Michigan, South Dakota, North Dakota, Minnesota and Wisconsin.

== See also ==
- Cooperalls
- Sportswear (activewear)
