= Titan (ice hockey) =

Finnish brand of ice hockey equipment

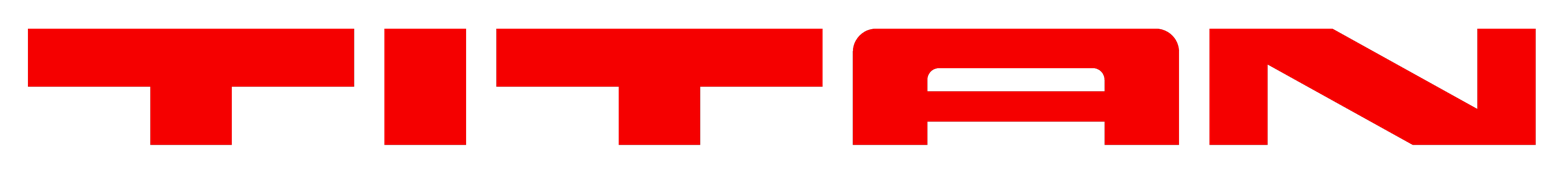
- Product type: Ice hockey sticks
- Current owner: Birch Hill Equity Partners
- Country: Finland
- Introduced: 1966

Titan is a brand of ice hockey sticks owned by Birch Hill Equity Partners through its portfolio company Sport Maska Inc. The company Titan OY was founded in Tampere, Finland in 1966 by Antti-Jussi Tiitola (1936–2021), and began by making alpine skis. Later in its first year of operations, Titan began manufacturing ice hockey sticks. Until the 1960s, hockey stick manufacturing was seen primarily as carpentry. Tiitola, an engineer by training, introduced science and technology to the design and production of sticks.

In 1972, Tiitola sold Titan OY to the sporting goods company Karhu, which then changed its name to Karhu-Titan. Karhu continued to manufacture Titan sticks, and then in 1979 transferred production to its partly owned Canadian arm, Karhu-Titan Canada Ltd. That same year, Karhu signed a deal with Wayne Gretzky to use Titan sticks exclusively. The company made a specially designed model for him that he used until 1990, at which point he switched to an Easton two-piece aluminium stick.

In 1998, Karhu Canada, which had been renamed the Sports Holdings Corporation, was purchased by SLM International, which was renamed The Hockey Company the following year. At this time, the Titan brand was mostly phased out. In 2004, Reebok purchased The Hockey Company, then in 2005, Reebok was purchased by Adidas. In 2017, Adidas sold all of its hockey operations, which were consolidated in the subsidiary Sport Maska Inc., to the private equity firm Birch Hill Equity Partners. Although Sport Maska's main brand is CCM, occasionally it makes retro sticks and apparel using the Titan name.
