= Cooper =

Cooper, Cooper's, Coopers and similar may refer to:

- Cooper (profession), a maker of wooden casks and other staved vessels

== Arts and entertainment ==
- Cooper (producers), an alias of Dutch producers Klubbheads
- "Cooper", a song by Roxette from the 1999 album Have a Nice Day
- Cooper Prize, an international playwriting prize based in Melbourne, Australia, since 2024

== Businesses ==
- Cooper (company), an American user experience design and business strategy consulting firm
- Cooper (motorcycles), an American brand of motorcycles
- Cooper Canada, a defunct sporting goods manufacturer
- Cooper Car Company, a British car company
  - Mini Cooper, the name of several cars
- Cooper Chemical Company, an American chemical manufacturer
- The Cooper Companies, an American medical device company
- Cooper Do-nuts, a Los Angeles cafe which was the site of alleged uprising in reaction to police harassment of LGBT people
- Cooper Enterprises, a Canadian boat builder
  - Cooper 353, a Canadian sailboat
  - Cooper 416, a Canadian sailboat
- Cooper Firearms of Montana, an American firearms manufacturer
- Coopers Inc., now part of Jockey, an American manufacturer of underwear
- Cooper Industries, an American electrical products manufacturer
- Cooper Tire & Rubber Company, an American company
- Coopers Brewery, an Australian beer company
- Cooper's (bakery), in Bangladesh
- Coopers' Company and Coborn School, in Upminster, UK
- Frank Cooper's, a British brand of marmalade
- Worshipful Company of Coopers, a City of London Livery Company

== People and fictional characters ==
- Cooper (surname), including a list of people and fictional characters
- Cooper (given name), including a list of people and fictional characters
- Cooper (artist), American artist Brian Cooper (born 1976)

== Places ==
=== United States ===
- Cooper City, Florida
- Cooper, Iowa
- Cooper, Kentucky
- Cooper, Maine
- Cooper, Minneapolis, Minnesota
- Cooper, Passaic County, New Jersey
- Cooper, Ohio
- Cooper, Texas, Delta County, Texas
- Cooper, U.S. Virgin Islands
- Cooper, Houston County, Texas
- Coopers, West Virginia
- Coopers, Georgia
- Coopers, in Logan Township, Gloucester County, New Jersey

=== Elsewhere ===
- Cooper (crater), on the Moon
- Division of Cooper, an electoral division in Victoria, Australia
- Electoral district of Cooper, electoral division in Queensland, Australia
- Cooper's Cave, South Africa

== Other uses ==
- Cooper School (disambiguation)
- Cooper Nuclear Station, a power plant in Brownville, Nebraska
- Cooper Stadium, Columbus, Ohio, U.S.
- Cooper Union for the Advancement of Science and Art, or Cooper Institute, a private college in New York City, U.S.
- Cooper University Hospital, Camden, New Jersey, U.S.
- Cooper Foundation, an American charitable and educational organization
- Cooper baronets, several baronetcies, including lists of baronets whose last name is Cooper
- Cooper, a dog who accompanied travel author Peter Jenkins in A Walk Across America, 1973–1979

== See also ==
- Cooper County (disambiguation)
- Cooper Creek (disambiguation)
- Cooper Island (South Georgia)
- Cooper Lake (disambiguation)
- Cooper Mountain (disambiguation)
- Cooper River (disambiguation)
- Cooper Township (disambiguation)
- Coopers Creek (disambiguation)
- Cooper's Hill (disambiguation)
- Cooper Black, a serif typeface
- Copper (disambiguation)
- Couper, a surname
- Couper Islands, Nunavut, Canada
- Cowper (disambiguation)
- Cupar (disambiguation)
- Koopa (disambiguation)
- Kooper, a surname
