= Itech =

Canadian brand of ice hockey equipment

- Product type: Ice hockey equipment
- Current owner: Bauer Hockey (2008–)
- Country: Canada
- Introduced: 1984
- Discontinued: 2009
- Previous owners: Itech Sports Products Inc. (1984–2004); Mission-Itech Hockey Ltd. (2004–2008)
- Website: Archived official website at the Wayback Machine (archived 2008-10-31)

Itech is a Canadian brand of ice hockey equipment owned by Bauer Hockey. The brand was created by former NHL player Robin Burns in 1984 and was manufactured by his company Itech Sports Products Inc. In 2004, his company merged with Mission Hockey to form Mission-Itech Hockey, which continued to produce Itech products until its purchase in 2008 by Bauer. Since 2009, the name has been absent from the hockey market.

== History ==
In 1984, Burns stepped down as president of the ice skate manufacturer Micron and started his own company, Itech Sports Products Inc., in Kirkland, Quebec. Initially, Burns set up the company to design and produce plastic face shields. At an old-timers game in the early 1980s, Burns was clipped in the face with a stick. After the game, he said to Red Storey that he would "have some sort of protective mask designed by that time next year." Burns's design went into production shortly after he started the company, and was soon adopted widely in the NHL.

In 2002, Itech diversified beyond hockey when it purchased the Cooper baseball assets from Irwin Toy.

In 2004, Burns merged Itech with Mission Hockey, which was based in California, to form Mission-Itech Hockey Ltd. For the next four years, the company continued to produce equipment under both brands. In the fall of 2008, Bauer purchased Mission-Itech. After the acquisition, Bauer continued to sell Itech equipment for a short time before phasing out the brand in 2009.
