= Kooser =

Kooser is a surname. Notable people with the surname include:

- Barry Kooser (born 1968), American artist, painter, and documentary filmmaker
- Ted Kooser (born 1939), American poet

== See also ==
- Kooper
