= Goaltender mask =

Sports mask protecting the head and face

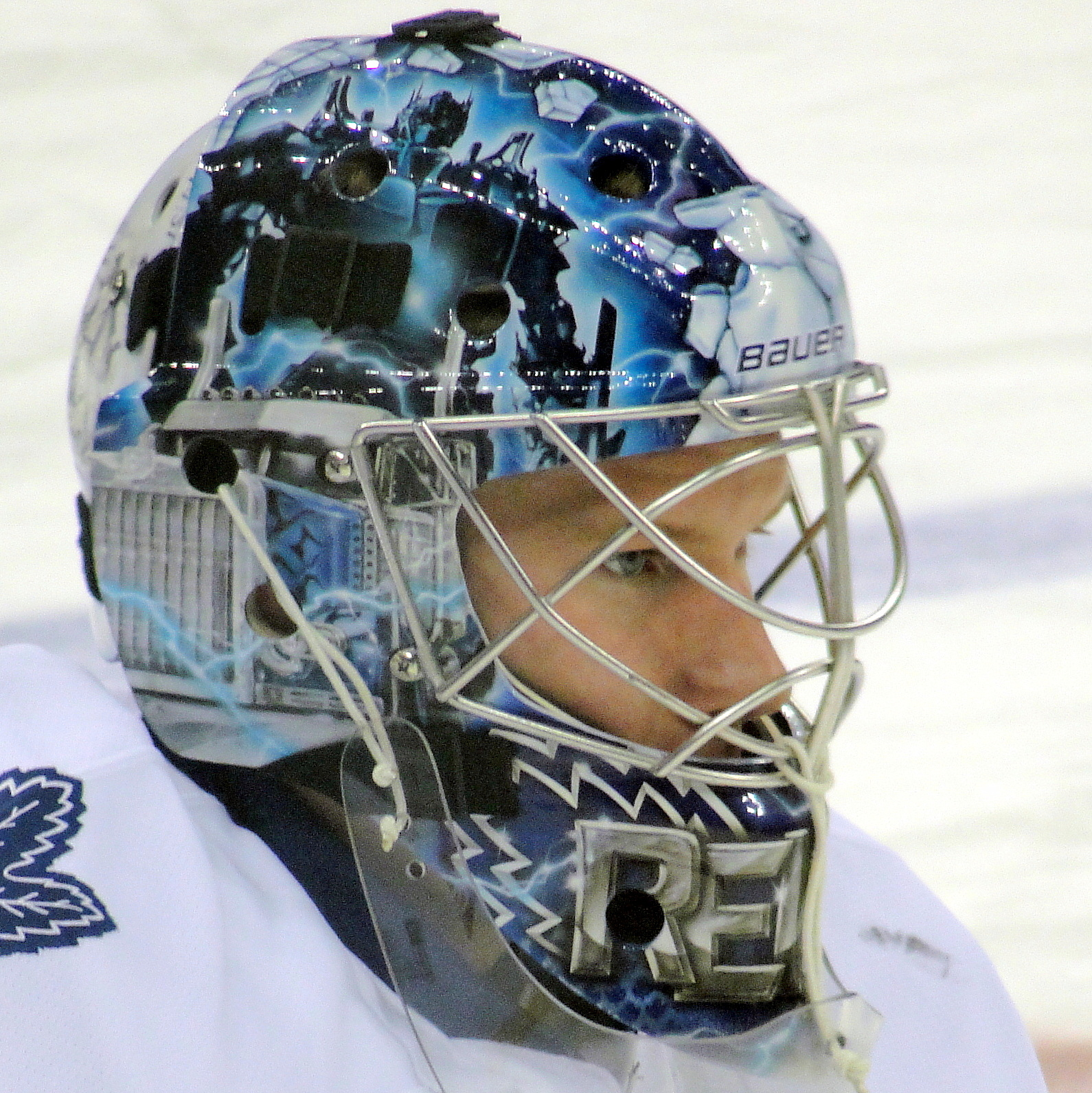
James Reimer wearing a goaltender mask

Braden Holtby wears a goaltender mask, protecting his head from an incoming shot on goal from Bryan Rust.

A goaltender mask, commonly referred to as a goalie mask, is a mask worn by goaltenders in a variety of sports to protect the head and face from injury from the ball or puck, as they constantly face incoming shots on goal. Some sports requiring their use include ice hockey, box lacrosse, inline hockey, field hockey, rink hockey, ringette, bandy, rinkball, broomball, and floorball. This article deals chiefly with the goalie masks used in ice hockey.

In ice hockey it is sometimes simply referred to as a hockey mask. In some cases the facemask must meet safety specifications designed for use in a specific sport such as ringette. Some recent changes have also occurred in bandy though not without controversy.

Jacques Plante was the first ice hockey goaltender to create and use a practical mask in 1959. Plante's mask was a piece of fiberglass that was contoured to his face. This mask later evolved into a helmet-cage combination, and single piece full fiberglass mask. Today, the full fiberglass mask with the birdcage facial protector (known as a "combo mask") is the more popular option, because it is safer and offers better visibility.

Since the invention of the fiberglass ice hockey mask, professional goaltenders no longer play without a mask, considering it is now a mandatory piece of equipment. The last goaltender to play without a mask was Andy Brown, who played his last NHL game in 1974. He later moved to the Indianapolis Racers of the World Hockey Association and played without a mask until his retirement in 1977.

== History ==
Clint Benedict became the first ice hockey goalie to wear facial protection in a game in 1930.

The first recorded case of an ice hockey goaltender using a mask was in February 1927 where a metal fencing mask was donned by Queen's University netminder Elizabeth Graham, mainly to protect her teeth.

In 1930, the first crude leather model of the mask (actually an American football "nose-guard") was worn by Clint Benedict to protect his broken nose. After recovering from the injury, he abandoned the mask, never wearing one again in his career.

At the 1936 Winter Olympics, Japanese ice hockey goaltender Teiji Honma wore a crude mask, similar to the one worn by baseball catchers. The mask was made of leather, and had a wire cage that protected the face, as well as Honma's large circular glasses.

=== Jacques Plante ===
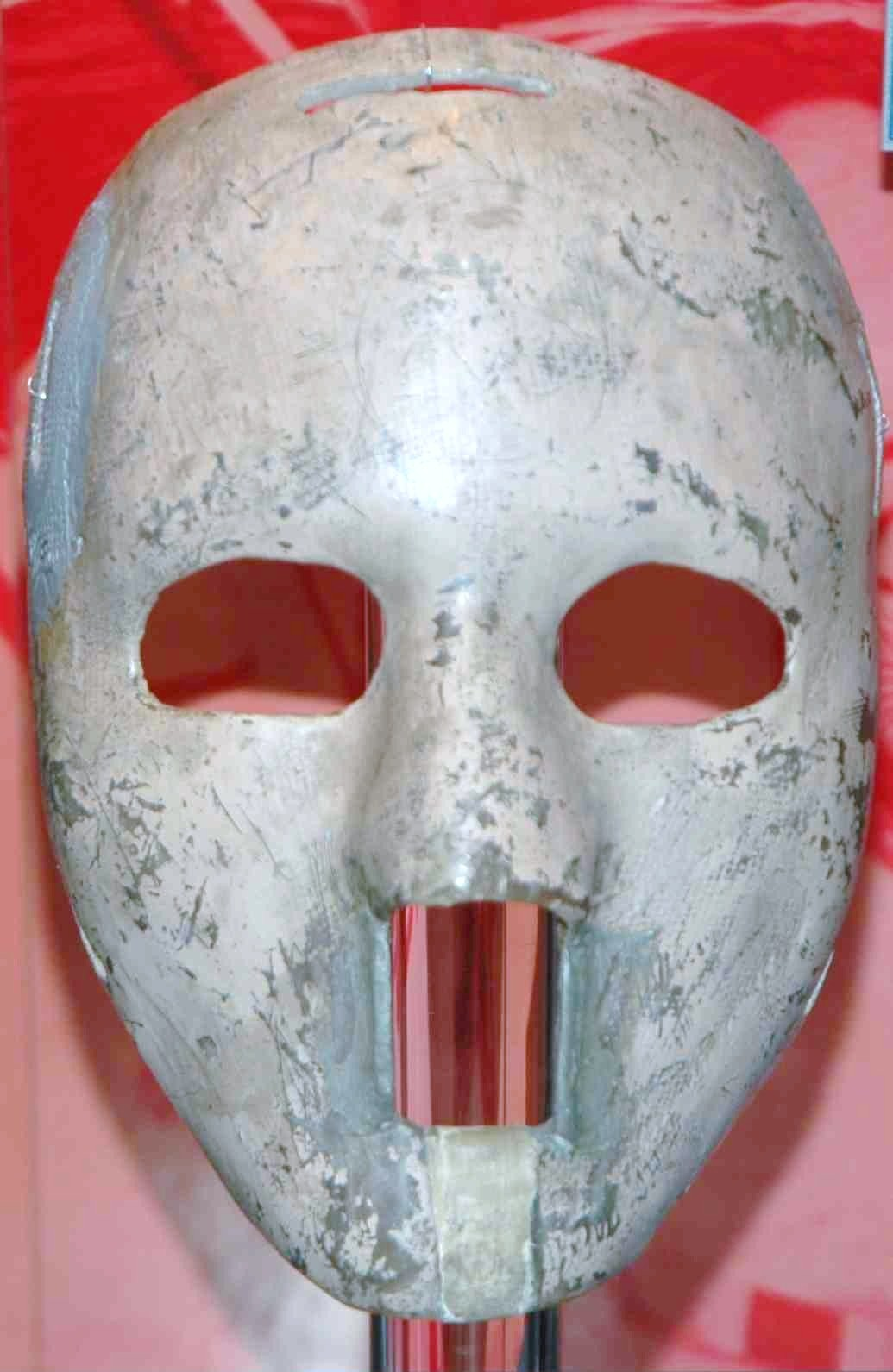
Jacques Plante's original fiberglass mask, first used in 1959; Hockey Hall of Fame, Toronto

It was not until 1959 that a goaltender wore a mask full-time. On November 1, 1959, in the first period of a game between the Montreal Canadiens and New York Rangers of the National Hockey League (NHL) at Madison Square Garden, Canadiens goaltender Jacques Plante was struck in the face by a shot from Andy Bathgate. Plante had previously worn his mask in practice, but head coach Toe Blake refused to allow him to wear it in a game, fearing it would inhibit his vision. After being stitched up, Plante gave Blake an ultimatum, refusing to go back out onto the ice without the mask, to which Blake obliged, not wanting to forfeit the game, since NHL teams did not have back-up goaltenders at the time. Montreal won the game 3–1 and continued on an 18-game unbeaten streak, which went through November.

In preparation for the playoffs, Plante was asked by Blake to remove it for a game on March 8, a 3–0 loss. Plante donned the mask the next night, and for the remainder of his career. When he introduced the mask into the NHL, many questioned his dedication and bravery; in response, Plante made an analogy to a person, which he described as skydiving without a parachute, which he considered a gesture of stupidity rather than bravery. Although Plante faced some laughter, the face-hugging fiberglass goaltender mask soon became the standard; by late 1969, only a few NHL goaltenders went without one.

== Types ==
=== Face-hugging ===
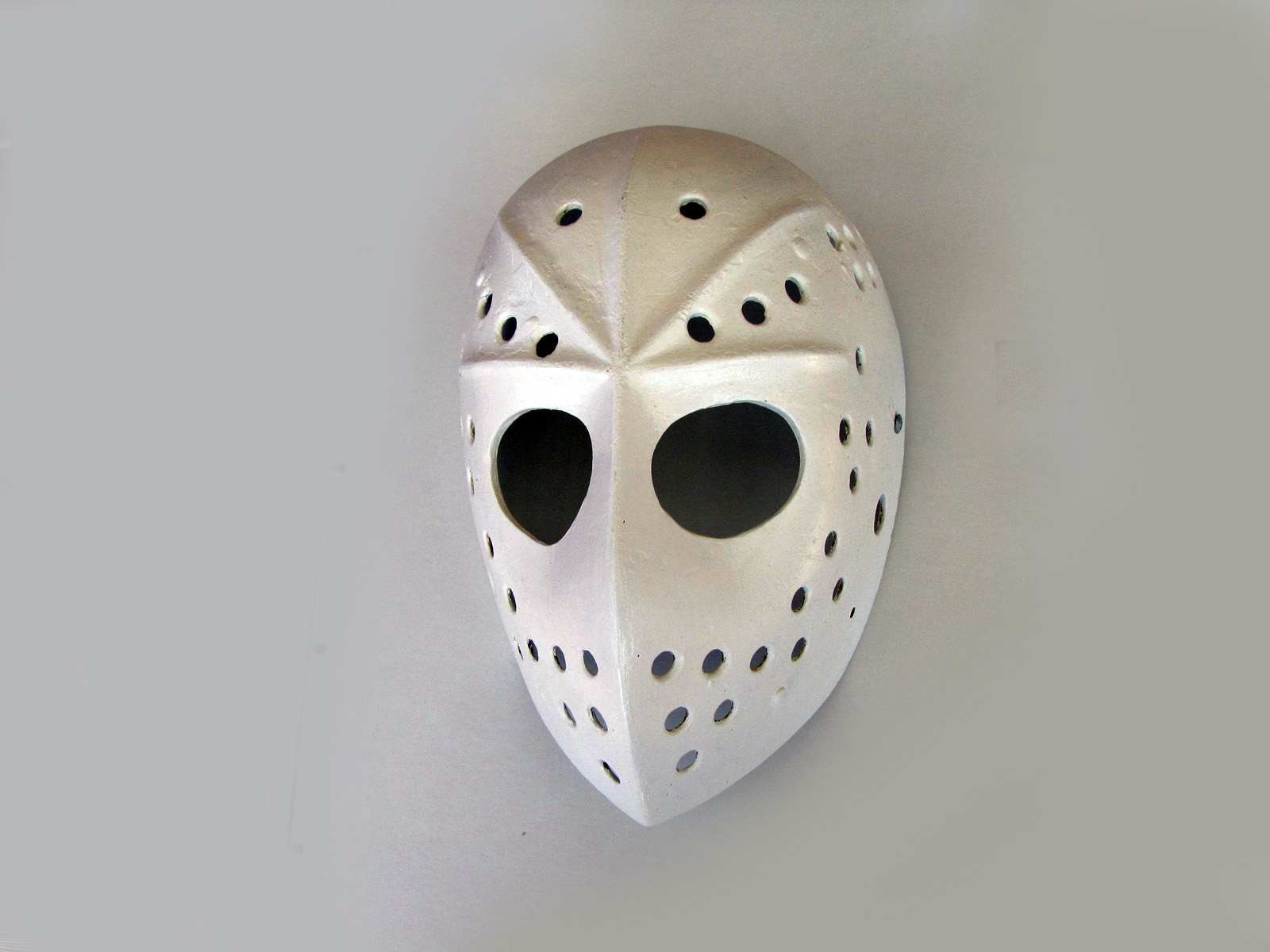
Left: 1970s mask made by Fibrosport; right: Friday the 13th character Jason Voorhees wearing the now-iconic goalie mask, molded from a 1970 Jacques Plante Elite FibroSport model 103, and painted in the style of a Detroit Red Wings mask

The face-hugging fiberglass, the type which was worn first by Jacques Plante, is a longtime symbol of ice hockey as typified by the famous painting At the Crease, by Ken Danby. The goaltender mask evolved further from the original face-hugging fiberglass mask designed by Plante. Although this mask does not seem very protective now, at the time it was, based on the style of game that was played.

Gerry Cheevers's use of the face-hugging mask for the Boston Bruins was among the first to be "decorated" in a custom manner; as prompted by then-Bruins trainer John "Frosty" Forristall as a joke, painting a fake stitch on the mask where Cheevers had been struck by an errant puck. Cheevers adopted the "stitch mask" as his own, and went on to set an NHL record (which still stands) of 32-straight wins during the Bruins' 1971–72 season.

While this style of mask is no longer used by hockey leagues, it has remained famous because of its use in popular culture. Perhaps the best-known example is the character Jason Voorhees from the Friday the 13th horror film franchise. Casey Jones from the Teenage Mutant Ninja Turtles franchise also wears a stylized version of the mask, as did D-Roc the Executioner, the late guitarist of the heavy metal band Body Count. Similarly, the members of Hollywood Undead are always seen wearing signature masks based on this design. In the film Heat, the protagonists wear face-hugging hockey masks as part of their disguise during a heist, as do the characters in the video game Grand Theft Auto: Vice City, during a mission which is heavily inspired by the heist from the film.

=== Helmet-cage ("bird cage") combination ===
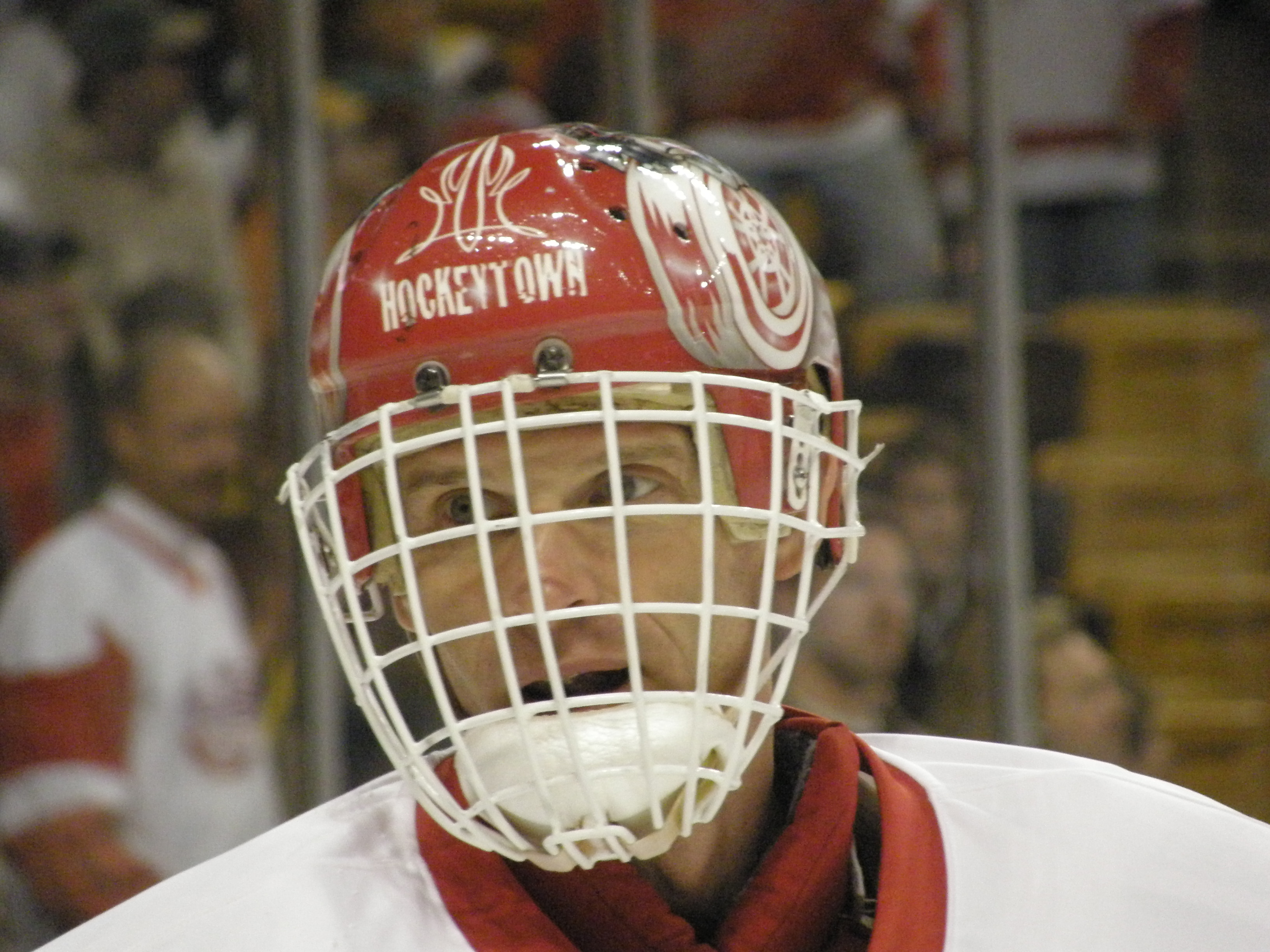
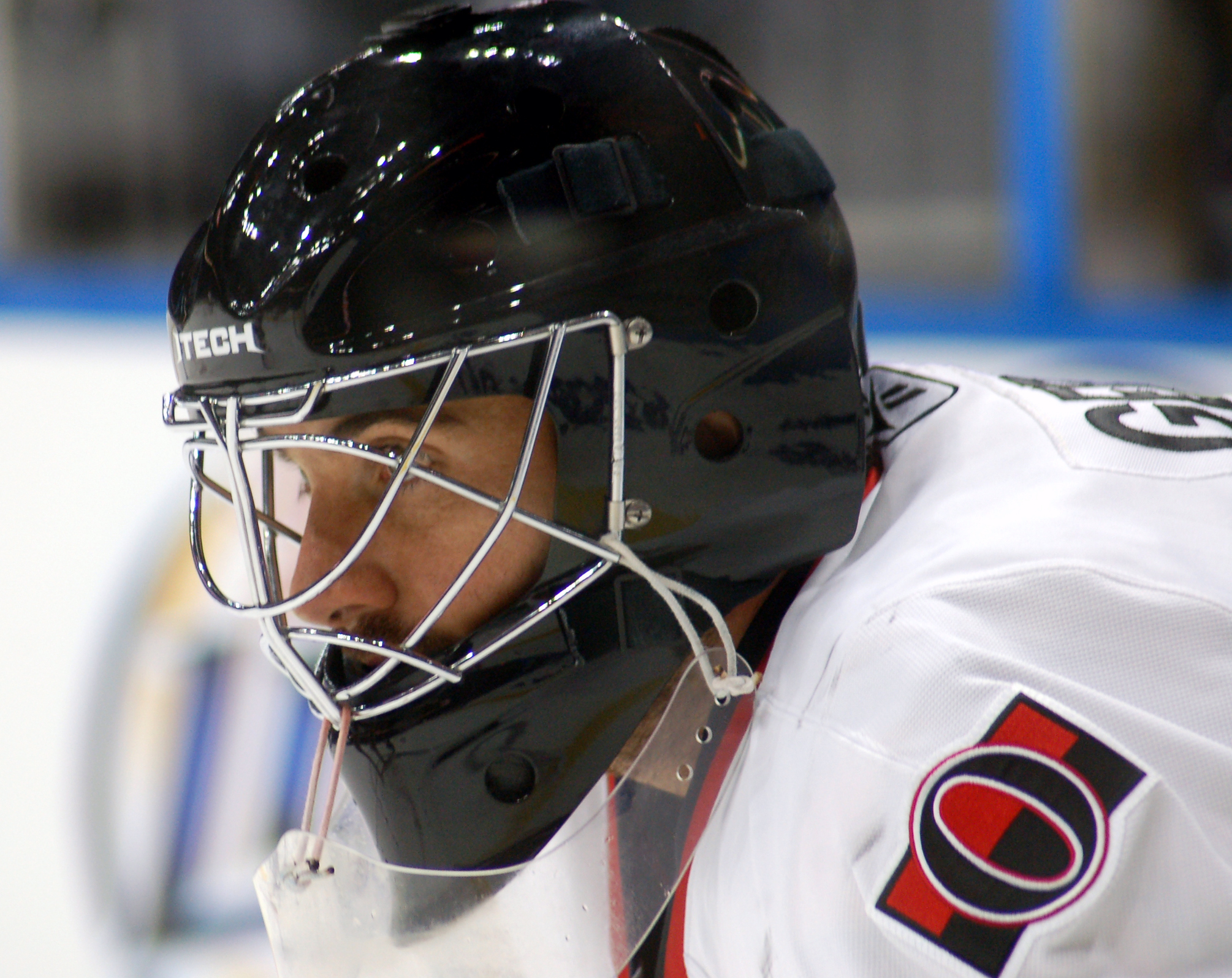
Left: the cage/helmet combo mask, worn by Dominik Hašek; right: A standard (typical) full fiberglass/Kevlar mask, as worn by Martin Gerber

In the 1970s, a helmet-cage combination was popularized by Vladislav Tretiak. He was particularly notable for wearing it during the 1972 Summit Series, which exposed the "bird-cage" style mask to Canadian hockey fans and players. Like the original fiberglass design, the helmet-cage combination has been criticized for not providing adequate facial/cranial protection. Chris Osgood wore this style of mask throughout his entire 17 year career (1993-2011). Dan Cloutier switched from this type of mask to the more popular full fiberglass citing safety reasons upon the advice of the Los Angeles Kings. Dominik Hašek used this type of mask. Rick DiPietro, last with the New York Islanders in 2013, was one of the last NHL goaltenders to use this type of mask. Following Clint Malarchuk's life-threatening injury in 1989, more goaltender masks have adopted a plastic extension to guard the neck, usually hanging loose for more maneuverability. On March 4, 2014, Tim Thomas took the ice for the Florida Panthers wearing an old Cooper helmet painted dark blue with a modern Bauer cage and white Itech neck guard attached. During the game, the cage broke from a slapshot and Thomas returned with a red Mage-style helmet with a similar Bauer cage. Goaltenders at lower levels of hockey (such as high-school, college or recreational leagues) who choose to use this design cite reasons such as the plastic helmet used is lighter than the fiberglass or composite materials used in other designs, and that the helmet has a wider opening than a traditional mask for a less claustrophobic feeling and better sight of the puck.

=== Fiberglass/cage combination (Combo mask) ===
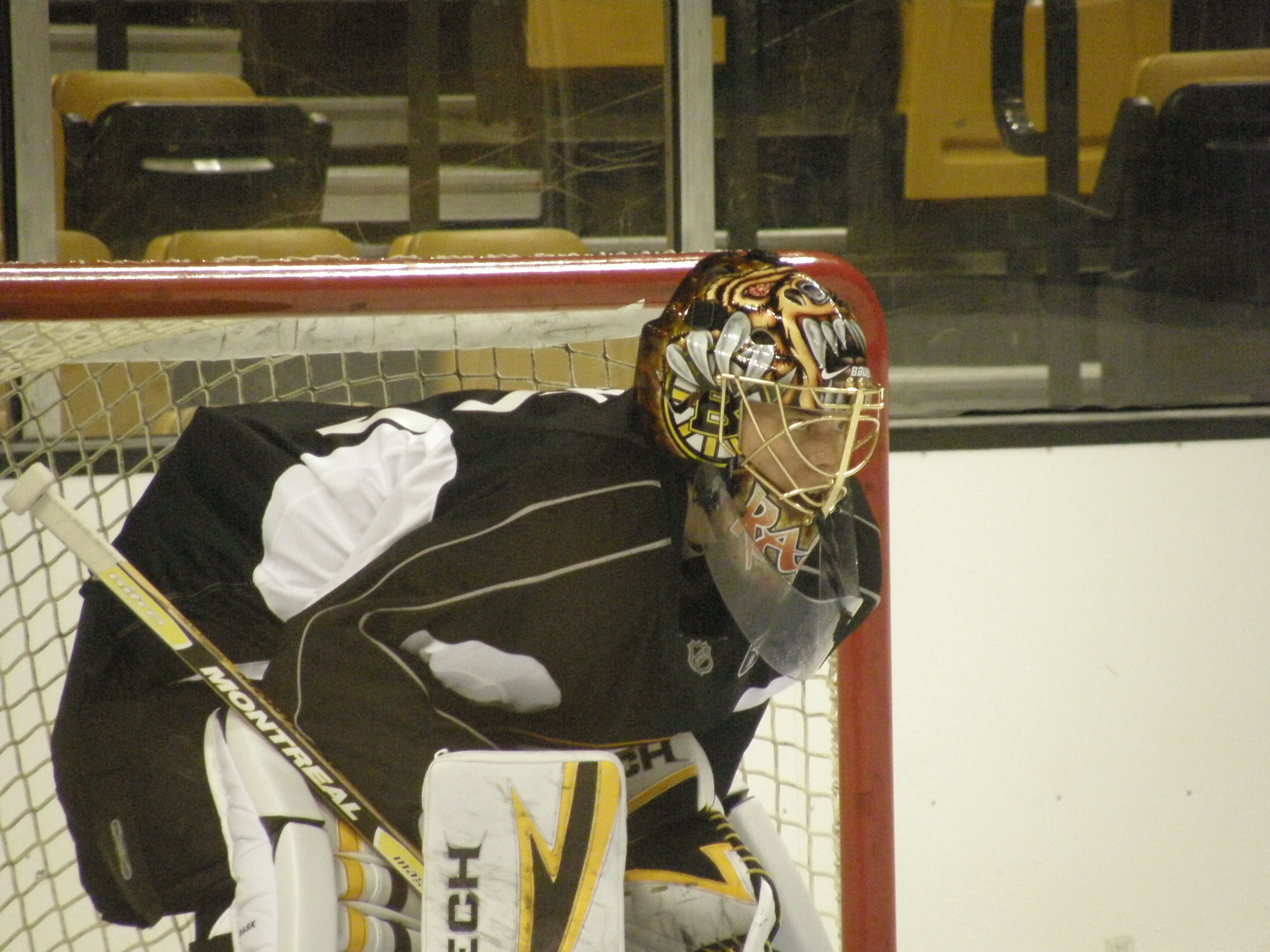
Boston Bruins goaltender Tuukka Rask with a full fiberglass/birdcage combination goaltender mask

In the late 1970s, a second type of goaltender mask consisting of a fiberglass mask with a wire cage covering a cut-out area in the middle of it was developed by Dave Dryden and Greg Harrison. The fiberglass portion can also be made out of carbon fiber, or a fiberglass and kevlar mix. Gilles Meloche and Chico Resch were among the first NHL adopters of the combo mask, in the early 1980s. More modern versions of this type of mask are designed to better withstand the impact of a hockey puck at higher speeds, and are used at all levels of organized ice hockey. This type of mask is considered safer than the other types, since it disperses the impact of the puck better than the helmet-cage combination, and is the most common type used by goaltenders today. Former goaltender Tim Thomas of the Boston Bruins wore a newer style one piece called a Sportmask Mage RS, which is made like the newer fiberglass mask, but resembles the helmet/cage combination. The combo mask was approved for Canadian minor hockey in 1989. Amateur versions have only square or rectangular openings between the bars, as the cats-eye bars are banned in minor hockey.

=== Cats-eye bars ===
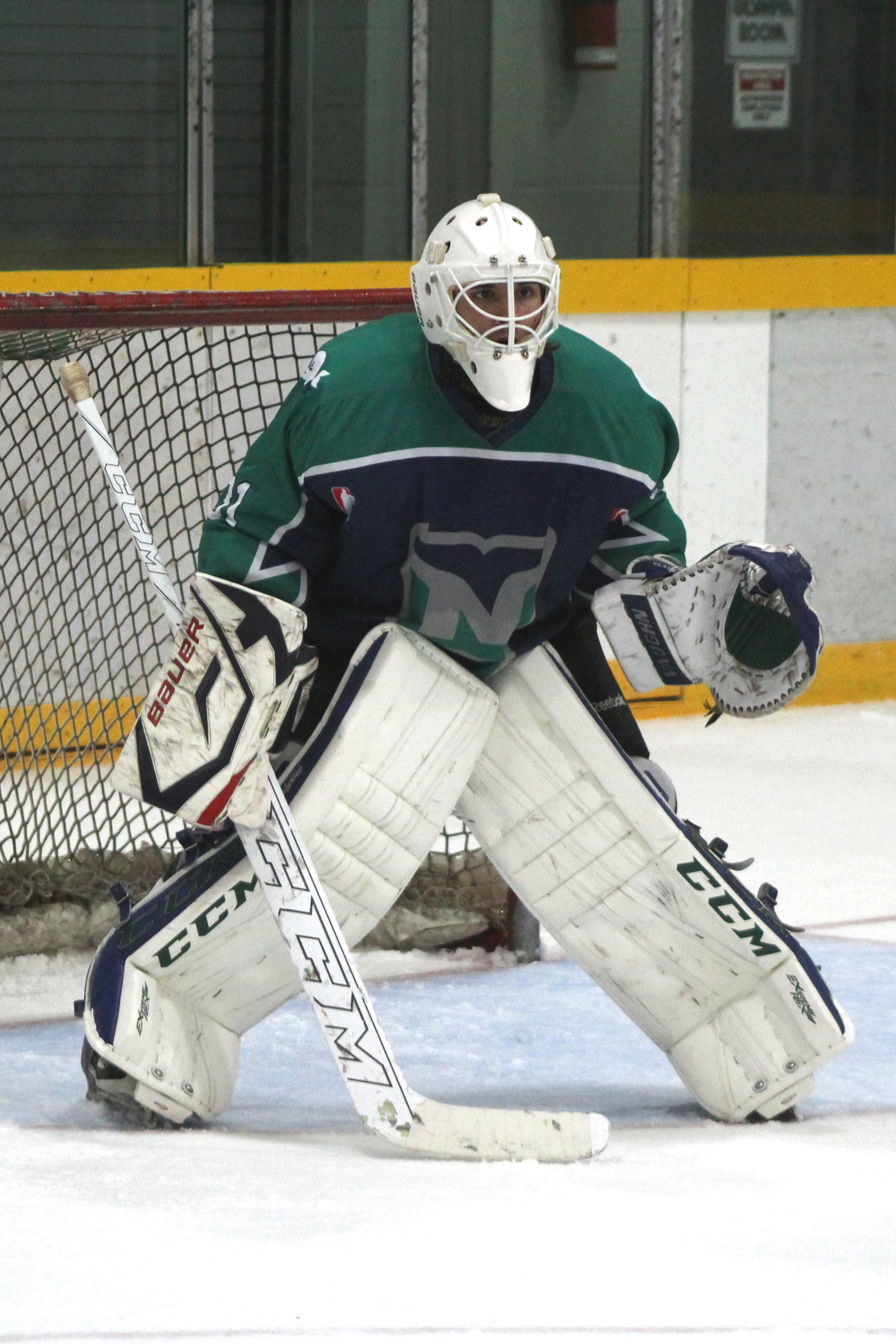
Canadian Inventor Brian Heaton helped inspire the basis for "cateye" cages in use by goalies today

Brian Heaton, designer of the Cooper Canada HM30 cage and HM40 for forward players, inspired the basis for all cats-eye bars, (a.k.a. "cateye" cages) in use by goaltenders today.

Cats-eye bars are banned in all minor hockey governed by Hockey Canada, unless they feature additional bars to reduce the size of the openings.

Many Cateye cages cause injuries if used due to their wider openings that cause sticks, pucks, and broken sticks to pierce through.

== Tactical play ==
The advent of the goaltender mask changed the way goaltenders play, allowing them to make more saves on their knees without fear of serious head or facial injuries. Before the advent of the mask, most goaltenders stayed standing as much as possible. In the modern era, a goaltender is likely to suffer temporary discomfort instead of serious concussions and lacerations; however, a mask does not eliminate all potential risk of injury, and goaltenders have been concussed by a shot hitting the head. Some goaltenders, such as Dominik Hašek and Henrik Lundqvist, have used their heads intentionally to stop shots. Lundqvist said that his reason for this is to not obstruct his vision by placing his catching glove in front of his mask to stop the shot.

== Mask decoration ==
With available surface area provided by fiberglass masks, goaltenders find it fashionable to give their mask distinctive decorations. This tradition started with the earliest masks, notably by the aforementioned, now-retired Boston Bruins goaltender Gerry Cheevers, who was known for drawing stitches on his mask whenever it got hit. These stitches represented where Cheevers would have been cut had he not been wearing his mask. Modern-day masks also offer this ability, and goaltenders are well-identified with their helmet design, often transferring the motif into their new team's colours when traded or signed to a new team (for example, Patrick Lalime's Marvin the Martian theme, Félix Potvin's cat theme, Curtis Joseph's Cujo theme, Ed Belfour's eagle theme, Martin Brodeur's Devils theme, Peter Budaj's Ned Flanders theme, Cam Talbot's Ghostbusters theme or John Gibson's Arcade game theme).

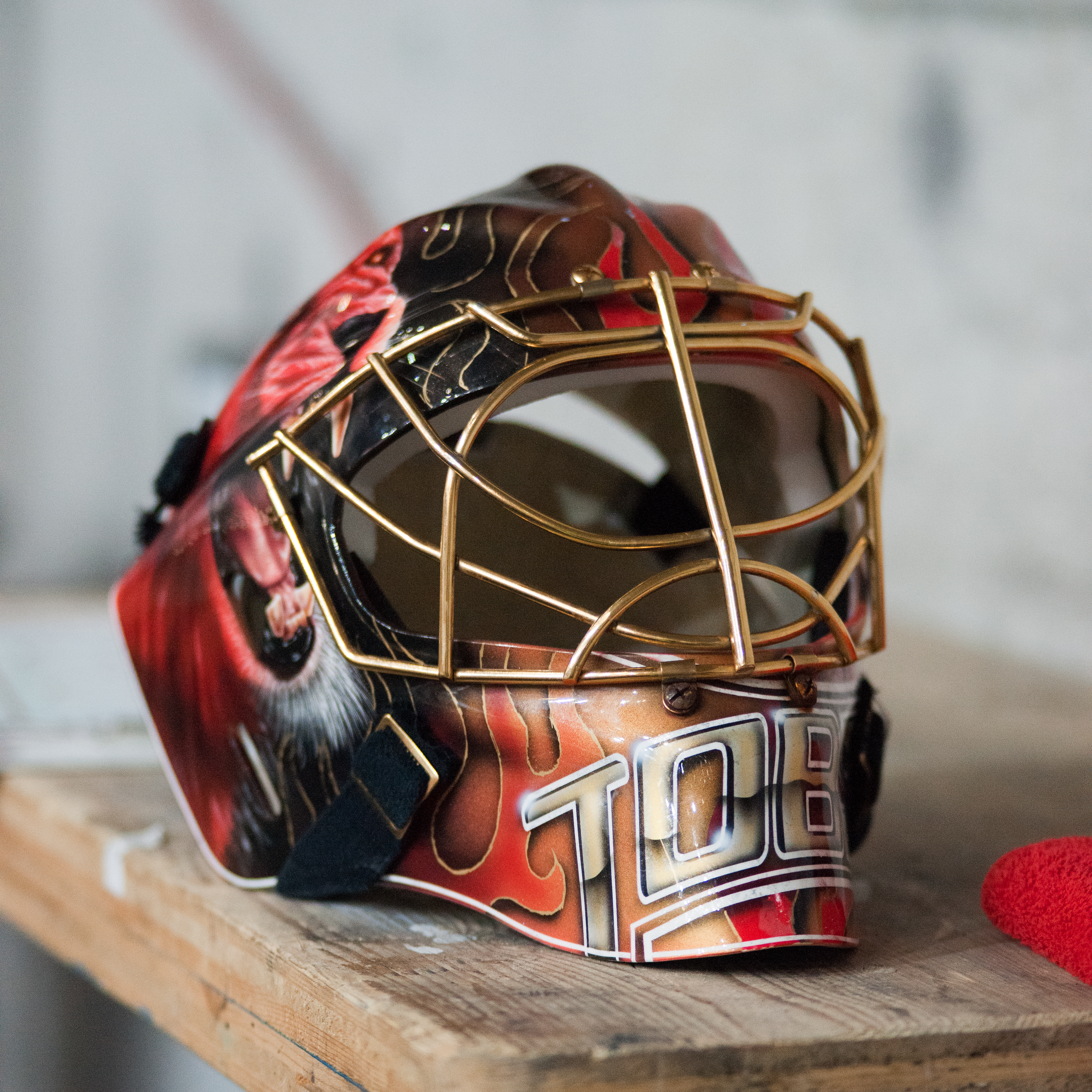
Modern decorated mask from Michael Tobler, Lausanne Season 2009–10, made by Airxess

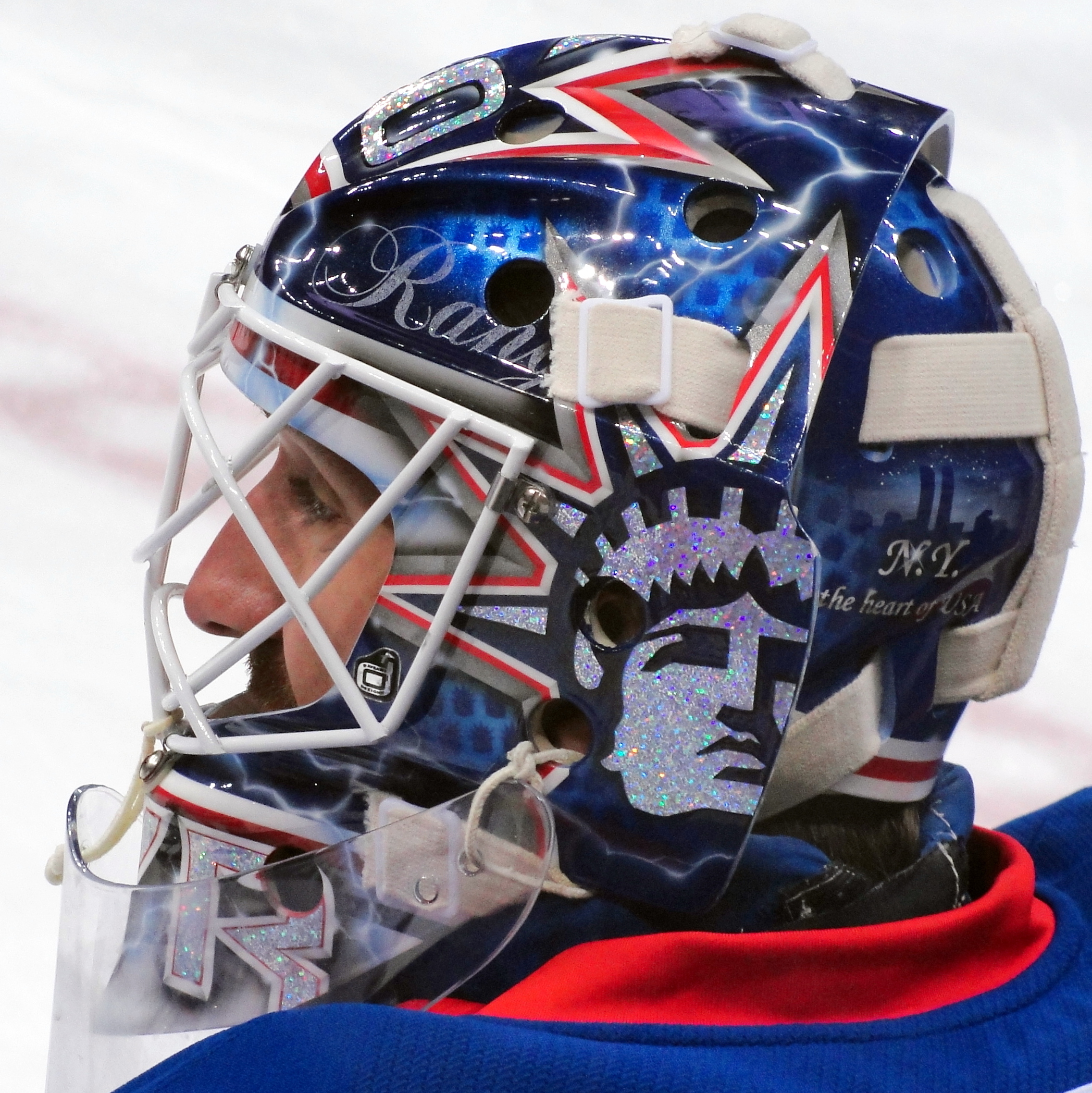
Henrik Lundqvist's mask featuring the Statue of Liberty

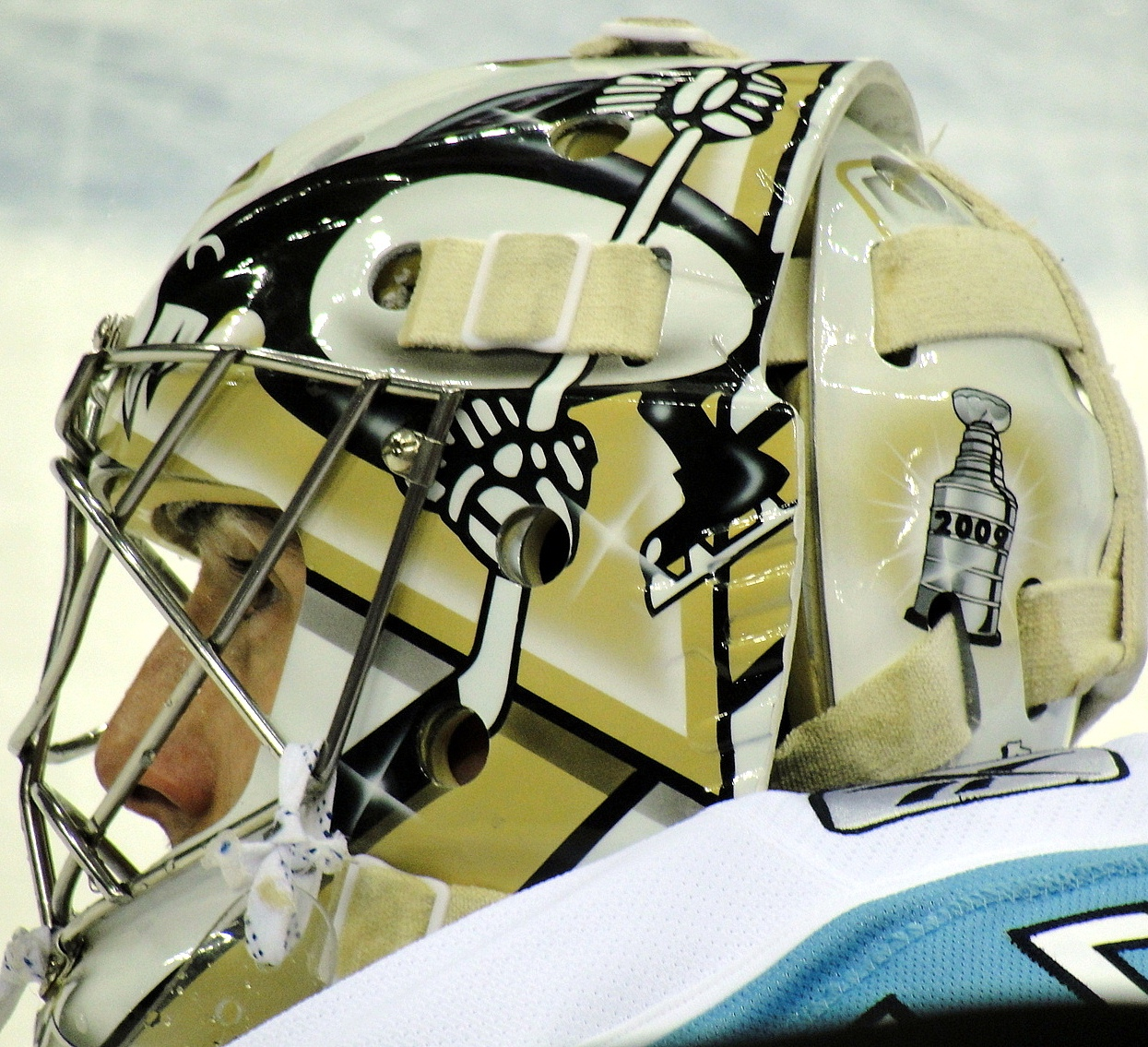
Marc-André Fleury's mask celebrating the Penguins 2009 Stanley Cup win

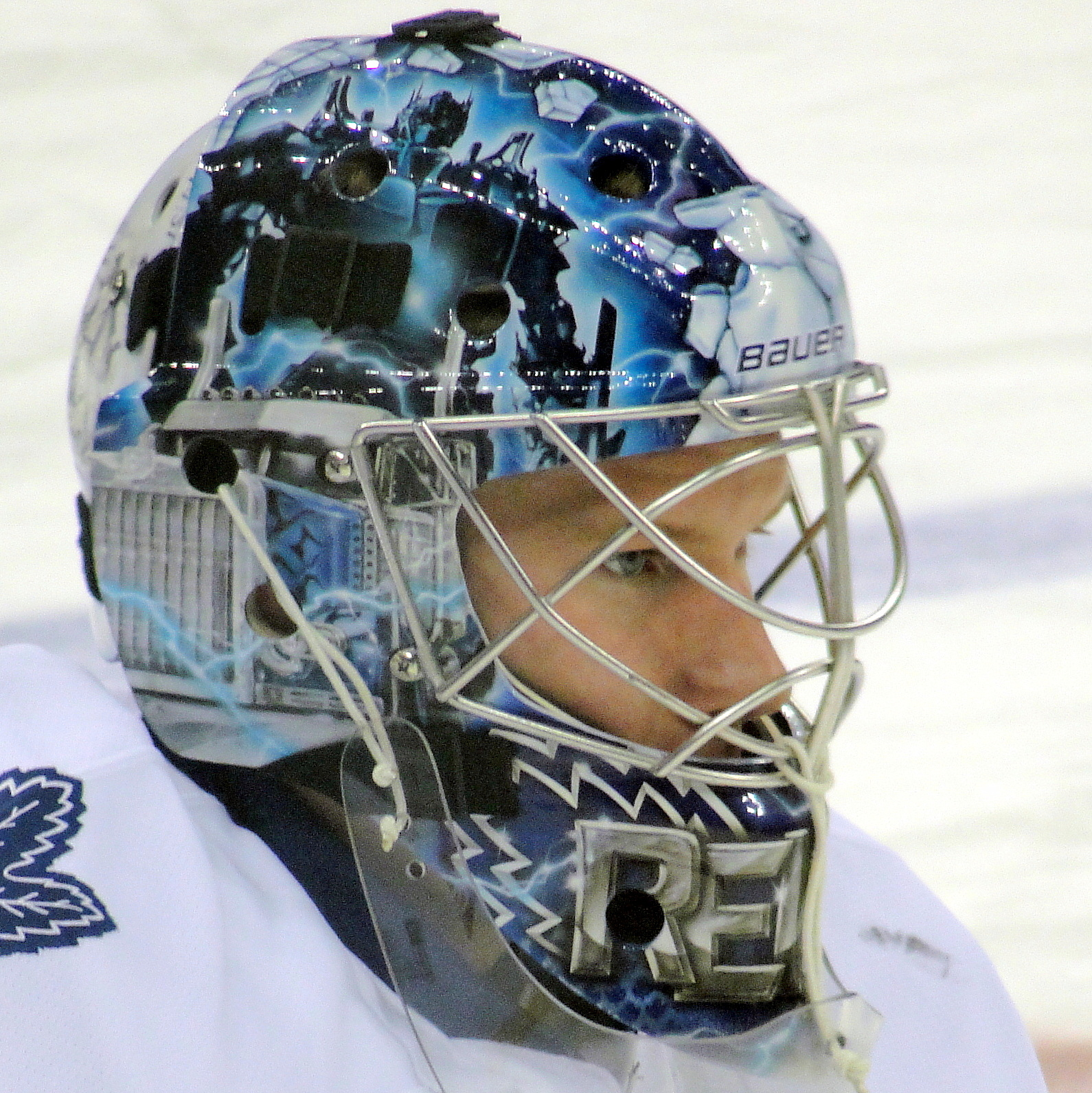
Leafs goaltender James Reimer's "Optimus Prime" themed mask

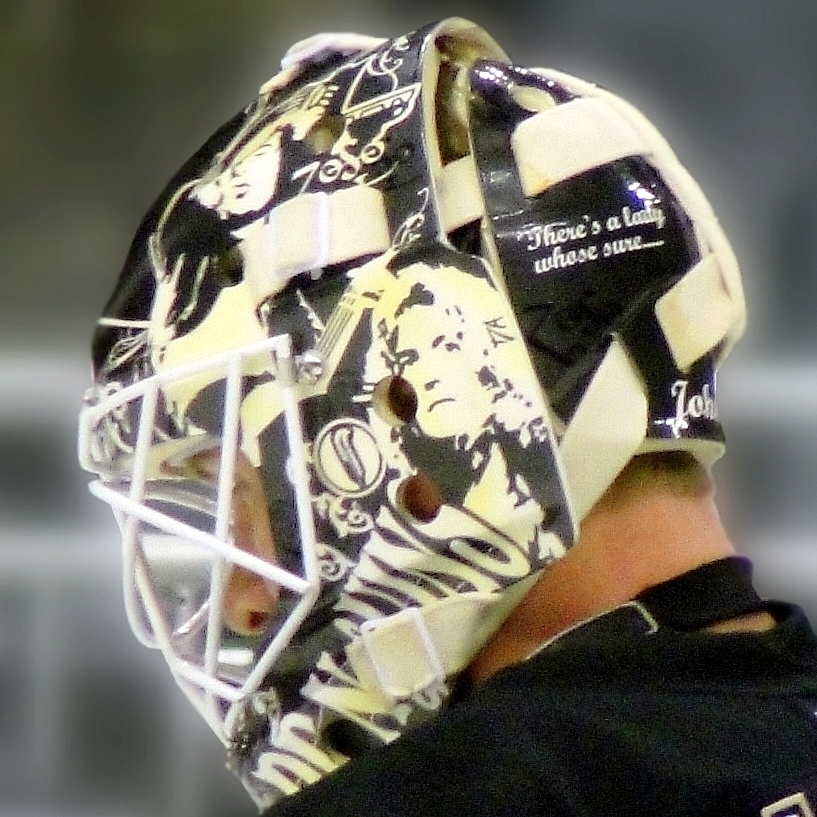
Brent Johnson's mask featuring Led Zeppelin graphics and lyrics

== Other uses ==
=== Other sports ===
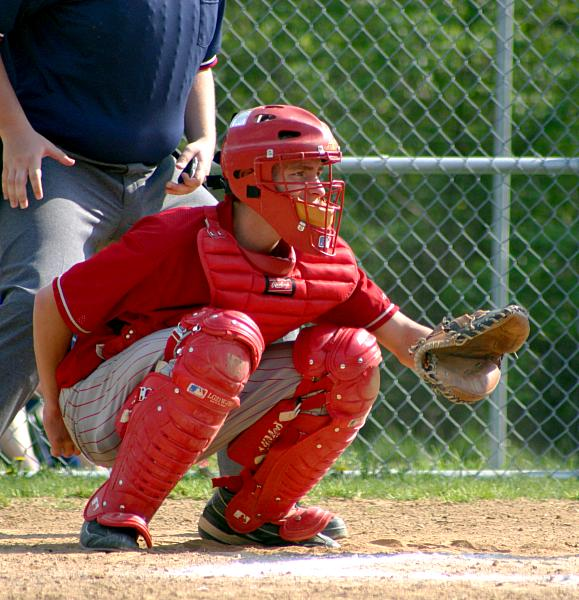
A baseball catcher wearing a mask modeled after the goaltender mask.

In recent years, baseball catchers have begun wearing facemasks similar in style to goaltender masks. Charlie O'Brien was the first to use a hockey-style catcher's mask in a Major League Baseball game in 1996 while playing for the Toronto Blue Jays.

Goaltender masks are commonly seen being worn by box lacrosse, ringette, rinkball, floorball and field hockey goaltenders at both youth and professional levels.

== See also ==
- Hockey helmet
- Goalie pads
- Ringette
