= Ruby Mountain (disambiguation) =

Ruby Mountain may refer to the following mountains:

- Ruby Mountain (Colorado), Summit County, Colorado, US
- Ruby Mountain (Washington), Washington, United States
- Ruby Mountain, British Columbia, Canada
- Ruby Mountain (New York), New York, United States

== See also ==
- Ruby Mountains
