= Cowper =

Cowper may refer to:

- Cowper (surname), people with the surname
- Earl Cowper, an extinct title in the peerage of Great Britain
- Cowper, New South Wales, a town in New South Wales, Australia
- Division of Cowper, an electoral district in the Australian House of Representatives, in New South Wales
- Cowper County, New South Wales
- Cowper House, Chester, England
- Cowper stove, a regenerative heat exchanger

== See also ==
- Bulbourethral gland or Cowper's gland, a component of the reproductive system of human males
- Cooper (profession); cowper is an old English spelling of cooper (a maker or repairer of casks and barrels)
- Pre-ejaculate or Cowper's fluid, the clear fluid emitted when a man is sexually aroused
- William Cowper (disambiguation)
