= Kooper =

Kooper is a surname. Notable people with the surname include:

- Al Kooper (born 1944), American songwriter, record producer and musician
- Kees Kooper (1923–2014), Dutch violinist
- Markus Kooper (1918–2005), Namibian activist, educator and religious figure
- Paula Kooper, Namibian politician
- Simon Kooper (before 1860–1913), Captain of the ǃKharakhoen (Fransman Nama), a subtribe of the Nama people in Namibia

== See also ==
- Cooper (disambiguation)
