= Koopa (disambiguation) =

Koopa usually refers to Koopa Troopas, fictional creatures from Nintendo's Mario franchise.

Koopa may also refer to:

- Bowser, a video game character and the main antagonist of the Mario franchise also known as King Koopa
  - Koopalings, Bowser's minions
- Koopa (band), an English rock band

== See also ==
- Cooper (disambiguation)
