= Cooper Mountain =

Cooper Mountain may refer to:

- Cooper Mountain (Colorado)
- Cooper Mountain (Oregon)
- Cooper Mountain (West Virginia)
