= Mary Louise Boehm =

American pianist and painter (1924–2002)

Mary Louise Boehm (July 25, 1924 – November 29, 2002) was an American pianist and painter.

A descendant of Joseph Boehm, a piano-maker active in Vienna during the early 19th century, Mary Louise Boehm was born in Sumner, Iowa, and soon proved to be a child prodigy. She studied with Louis Crowder at Iowa State Teachers College (now the University of Northern Iowa) and subsequently with Robert Casadesus and Walter Gieseking.

Boehm's repertoire and recorded output was notable for works by American composers such as Amy Beach and Ernest Schelling, who are far from mainstream, even now. She also performed and made premiere recordings of works by several early romantic composers such as John Field, Johann Nepomuk Hummel, Johann Peter Pixis, Ignaz Moscheles and Friedrich Kalkbrenner. Her advocacy introduced a generation of music lovers to these neglected composers. She was also interested in performance on period instruments at a time when this was rare.

From the 1960s she began painting, working in oils, watercolor and inks. While on concert tours in South America she became interested in textiles, which led to her involvement with weaving, textile design and the complicated field of dye and color chemistries. Eventually she chose batik as a painterly textile medium. She studied the traditional Indonesian batik techniques and pioneered modern adaptations, and had major shows in the United States.

She married the Dutch violinist Kees Kooper with whom she performed regularly. In 2002 she died in Spain. Her sister Pauline Boehm Haga was also a pianist; the Grand Sonata Op. 112 by Moscheles was recorded by the sisters together.
