= Coopers Creek =

Cooper's Creek or Coopers Creek may refer to:

- Cooper Creek, formerly Cooper's Creek, a river in Queensland and South Australia, Australia
- Coopers Creek (New South Wales), a river in Australia
- Coopers Creek, New Zealand, a town in the Waimakariri District
- Coopers Creek (West Virginia), a stream in the United States
- Coopers Creek, Victoria, a former township in Australia
- Upstream Cooper River (New Jersey), in the United States
