= Cooper Mountain (Colorado) =

Mountain in Colorado, United States

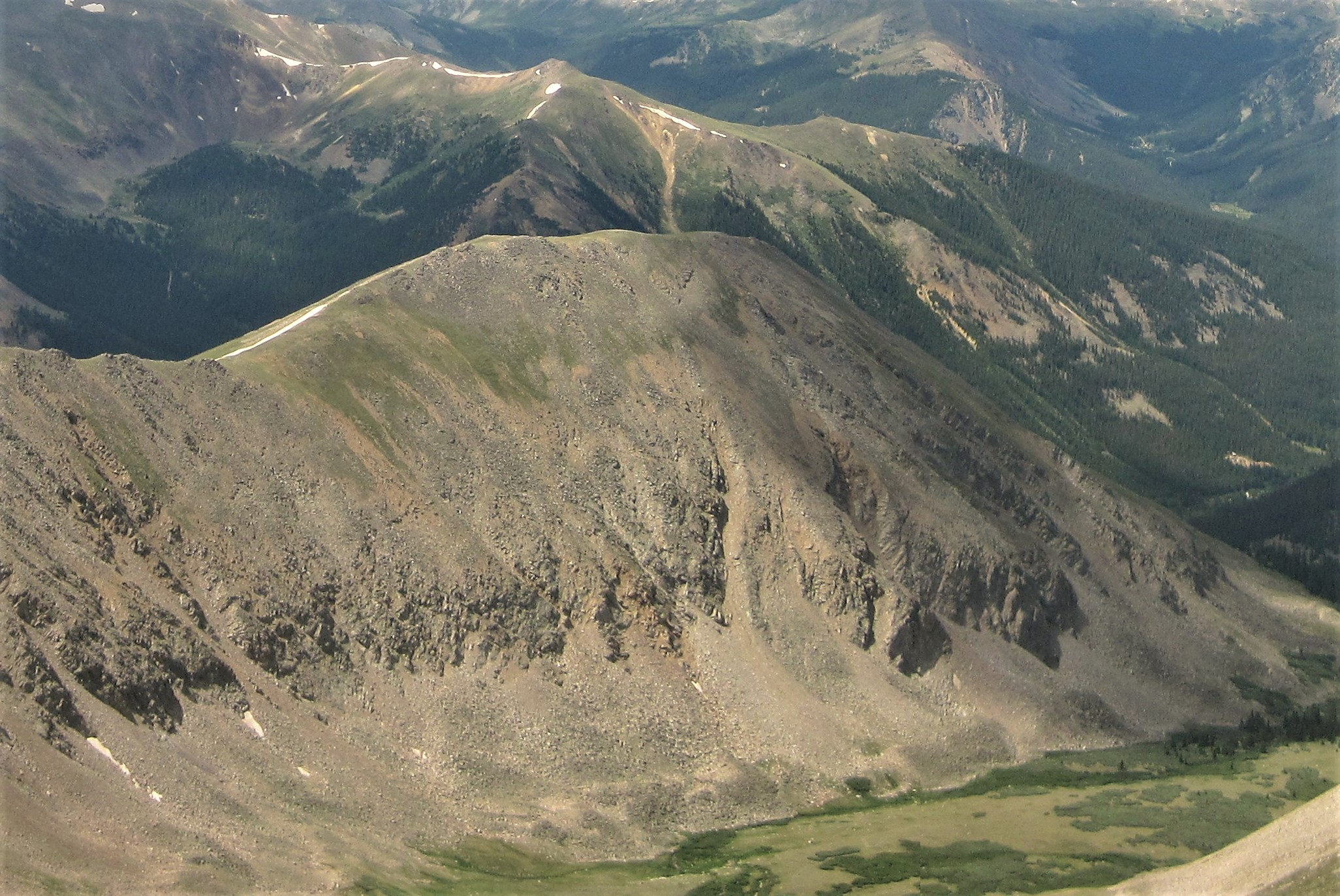
- North aspect

Highest point
- Elevation: 12,782 ft (3,896 m)
- Prominence: 172 ft (52 m)
- Parent peak: Ruby Mountain (13,277 ft)
- Isolation: 0.80 mi (1.29 km)
- Coordinates: 39°36′45″N 105°49′39″W

Geography
- Location within Colorado Location within the United States
- Country: United States
- State: Colorado
- County: Summit County
- Protected area: White River National Forest
- Parent range: Rocky Mountains; Front Range
- Topo map: USGS Montezuma

Climbing
- Easiest route: class 2

Cooper Mountain is a mountain east of Dillon in Summit County, Colorado. Grays Peak lies northeast of Cooper Mountain and Lenawee Mountain is located northwest.

== Climate ==
According to the Köppen climate classification system, Cooper Mountain is located in an alpine subarctic climate zone with cold, snowy winters, and cool to warm summers. Due to its altitude, it receives precipitation all year, as snow in winter and as thunderstorms in summer, with a dry period in late spring. Climbers can expect afternoon rain, hail, and lightning from the seasonal monsoon in late July and August.
