= Cooper's Hill =

Cooper's Hill or Cooper Hill may refer to:

- Cooper's Hill, Bedfordshire, UK, a site of Special Scientific Interest
- Cooper's Hill, Brockworth, Gloucestershire, UK
  - Cooper's Hill Cheese-Rolling and Wake an annual event in Brockworth
- Cooper's Hill, near Englefield Green, Surrey, UK
- Cooper's Hill (football ground), a former football ground in West Bromwich, once occupied by West Bromwich Albion F.C.
- Royal Indian Engineering College, known colloquially as Cooper's Hill
- Cooper's Hill, a 1642 poem by John Denham
- Cooper Hill, Missouri, a community in the United States
