= Robin Burns =

Canadian ice hockey player

- Born: August 27, 1946 (age 79) Montreal, Quebec, Canada
- Height: 6 ft 0 in (183 cm)
- Weight: 195 lb (88 kg; 13 st 13 lb)
- Position: Left wing
- Shot: Left
- Played for: Pittsburgh Penguins; Kansas City Scouts
- NHL draft: undrafted
- Playing career: 1970–1976

Robin Arthur Burns (born August 27, 1946) is a Canadian former professional ice hockey left winger. He is the cousin of coach Pat Burns.

== Playing career ==
Burns is the son of the late Robert and Eileen Burns. Robert Burns was an employee of the Montreal Transportation Commission. At age nine, Burns was diagnosed with osteomyelitis in his right leg. He endured five months of the leg being encased in a cast. (Icing on the Plains: The Rough Ride of Kansas City's NHL Scouts, p. 150, Troy Treasure, Balboa Press).

Following a season for the Montreal Notre Dame de Grace Monarchs, Burns went on to play three years with the Montreal Junior Canadiens and another two with the Houston Apollos of the Central Hockey League (CHL).

"In a 10 page sports section, the Houston Apollos were on page 10. You had the Oilers and the Astrodome, the Eighth Wonder of the World," Burns told Treasure in 2018. "Being away from Montreal for the first time, my first Christmas in Houston was a shock. It was pleasant and 70. In Montreal, it was -20. It was strange to be around the pool at Christmas time." (pp. 150-151)

After spending a season with the Montreal Voyageurs of the American Hockey League (AHL), Burns was traded from the Montreal Canadiens to the Pittsburgh Penguins for cash in 1970. Most of his time with in the Penguins organization was spent with the AHL's Hershey Bears, whom he helped lead to the 1974 Calder Cup by recording 10 goals and 14 points in 14 playoff games. In June 1974, Burns was claimed by the Kansas City Scouts in the expansion draft. He posted his best seasons with the Scouts but was phased out as the team rebuilt for their move to Colorado. In 190 regular-season games, Burns recorded 31 goals and 38 assists for 69 points.

Following his playing career, Burns and his wife Fran studied polycarbonate and created the protective hockey visor while establishing Itech. Burns was also a coach's agent representing his cousin Pat, as well as John Tortorella, Alain Vigneault, Michel Therrien, and Dave King. (Icing on the Plains: The Rough Ride of Kansas City's NHL Scouts, p. 246, Troy Treasure, Balboa Press).

== Career statistics ==
=== Regular season and playoffs ===
			Regular season					Playoffs
Season	Team	League	GP	G	A	Pts	PIM	GP	G	A	Pts	PIM
1963–64	Montreal NDG Monarchs	MMHJL	44	13	16	29	50	18	3	5	8	27
1963–64	Montreal NDG Monarchs	Mem-Cup	—	—	—	—	—	13	3	5	8	14
1964–65	Montreal Junior Canadiens	OHA	39	1	5	6	0	—	—	—	—	—
1965–66	Montreal Junior Canadiens	OHA	42	6	2	8	97	—	—	—	—	—
1966–67	Montreal Junior Canadiens	OHA	46	11	12	23	99	—	—	—	—	—
1967–68	Houston Apollos	CPHL	65	21	25	46	41	—	—	—	—	—
1968–69	Houston Apollos	CHL	61	12	18	30	63	3	0	0	0	0
1969–70	Montreal Voyageurs	AHL	62	13	7	20	33	8	0	1	1	0
1970–71	Pittsburgh Penguins	NHL	10	0	3	3	4	—	—	—	—	—
1970–71	Amarillo Wranglers	CHL	46	16	24	40	49	—	—	—	—	—
1971–72	Hershey Bears	AHL	65	18	15	33	58	4	1	1	2	10
1971–72	Pittsburgh Penguins	NHL	5	0	0	0	8	—	—	—	—	—
1972–73	Hershey Bears	AHL	39	22	25	47	51	—	—	—	—	—
1972–73	Pittsburgh Penguins	NHL	26	0	2	2	20	—	—	—	—	—
1973–74	Hershey Bears	AHL	74	31	35	66	77	14	10	4	14	6
1974–75	Kansas City Scouts	NHL	71	18	15	33	70	—	—	—	—	—
1975–76	Kansas City Scouts	NHL	78	13	18	31	37	—	—	—	—	—
NHL totals			190	31	38	69	139	—	—	—	—	—

== Transactions ==
- On October 10, 1970 the Montreal Canadiens traded Robin Burns to the Pittsburgh Penguins.
- On June 12, 1974 the Kansas City Scouts claimed Robin Burns from the Pittsburgh Penguins in the 1974 NHL Expansion Draft.
