= Mission Hockey =

American brand of inline skates

Mission
- Product type: Inline skates
- Current owner: Bauer Hockey (2008–)
- Country: United States
- Introduced: December 20, 1994
- Previous owners: Mission Hockey Company (1994–2004); Mission-Itech Hockey Ltd. (2004–2008)
- Website: Archived official website at the Wayback Machine (archived 2004-06-03)

Mission Hockey is an American brand of inline skates currently owned by Bauer Hockey. In December 1994, three former Bauer employees founded the Dare Development Group and began producing roller hockey equipment under the Mission brand name. In December 1997, Dare changed its name to the Mission Hockey Company after it expanded to ice hockey. During the late 1990s and early 2000s, Mission equipment was used widely in the National Hockey League. In 2004, Mission merged with Itech to form Mission-Itech Hockey Ltd. Mission equipment remained in production until 2008, when Bauer purchased Mission-Itech. Bauer continues to produce inline skates using Mission branding, while the name has been absent in the hockey market since it was taken over.

== History ==
The Dare Development Group Inc. was founded in Santa Ana, California on December 20, 1994 by Thomas V. Wilder, Kelly Burns, and Alexander Reynolds, three former employees of Canstar, the owner of Bauer Hockey. The trio left Canstar in the wake of its purchase by Nike in December 1994. Wilder, the company's first president, was a native of Williamsburg, Virginia, and had no exposure to hockey until the 1980 Miracle on Ice. The founders believed that California was a rapidly growing market for hockey, and saw roller hockey as a way to make the sport accessible in the warmer climate. Wilder said, "all of these players were emerging and facilities were going up and there was nobody out here making product."

In July 1996, in need of investment, the three founders sold the company to Bob Naegele Jr., who later founded the Minnesota Wild. Naegele appointed Steve Meineke of the Meineke family as chairman and chief executive officer. In its second year of operations, Mission's sales were around $14 million.

Dare began manufacturing ice skates and protective equipment in 1997. Later that year, it changed its name to the Mission Hockey Company. Soon, Mission equipment was adopted by players in the National Hockey League. Its M-1 line of sticks and gloves was especially popular.

In April 2004, Mission Hockey merged with Itech Sports Products Inc. to form Mission-Itech Hockey Ltd. The new company elected to use the Itech offices in Kirkland, Quebec as its head office. Naegele became chairman of the board of the company, while Mission president Mike Whan was appointed president and chief executive.

In February 2008, W. Graeme Roustan, in partnership with Kohlberg & Company, acquired Bauer Hockey from Nike for $200 million. Released from the protection of the sporting goods giant, Roustan set out to grow Bauer in order to protect the company's standing in the hockey market. In September 2008, only six months after Bauer became independent, the company acquired Mission-Itech. Mission-Itech's president Whan related, "consolidation is essential for the long-term success of the overall hockey industry."

After the Bauer takeover, the Mission and Itech names were phased out of hockey equipment in 2009. Bauer continues to use the Mission brand on its inline skates.

In October 2016, Performance Sports Group, Mission's parent company at the time, filed for bankruptcy. In January 2017, PSG reached an agreement with Sagard Capital Partners and Fairfax Financial Holdings Ltd to sell its assets for $575 million, including Mission.
