= Cooper Creek (disambiguation) =

Cooper Creek is a river in Australia.

Cooper Creek may also refer to:

- Cooper Creek (Toccoa River tributary), a stream in Georgia, US
- Cooper Creek (Deepwater Creek), a stream in Missouri
- Cooper Creek (New York), a river in Otsego County
- Cooper Creek, an area that was mined for gold, in Cooper Landing, Alaska
- Cooper Creek Stage Station, Wyoming
