= Cowper (surname) =

Cowper (pronounced Cowper or Cooper depending on family) is a surname of several persons:

- Andrew Cowper (1898–1980), Australian fighter pilot
- Austen Cowper (1885–1960), South African cricketer
- Bob Cowper (1940–2025), Australian cricketer
- Sir Charles Cowper (1807–1875), Australian politician
- Charles Cowper Jr. (1834–1911), Australian politician, son of Sir Charles Cowper Snr.
- David Scott Cowper (born 1942), British yachtsman
- Douglas Cowper (1817–1839), British painter
- E. E. Cowper (1859–1933), British author
- Edward Alfred Cowper (1819–1893), British mechanical engineer and metallurgist
- Frances Maria Cowper (née Madan; sometimes known as Maria Frances; 1726–1797), British poet
- Francis Thomas de Grey Cowper, 7th Earl Cowper
- Frank Cowper (1849–1930), British yachtsman and author
- Frank Cadogan Cowper (1877–1958), British artist
- Gerry Cowper (born 1958), British actress
- Mary Cowper (1685–1724), British courtier and diarist
- Nicola Cowper (born 1967), British actress
- Peter Cowper (1902–1962), English footballer of the 1920s and 1930s
- Richard Cowper, pseudonym of John Middleton Murry Jr. (1926–2002)
- Robert Cowper (composer) (1465–1539/40), English composer
- Robert Cowper (RAAF officer) (1922–2016), flying ace of the Royal Australian Air Force
- Sarah Cowper (1644–1720), English diarist
- Spencer Cowper (1670–1728), British MP and barrister
- Spencer Cowper (priest) 1713–1774, Dean of Durham Cathedral
- Steve Cowper (born 1938), American politician and governor of Alaska
- William Cowper (disambiguation), multiple people

== See also ==
- Earl Cowper, a title in the Peerage of Great Britain
