= Cooper, U.S. Virgin Islands =

Coordinates: 17°41′41″N 64°48′36″W

Cooper, United States Virgin Islands
- Village
- Interactive map of Cooper, United States Virgin Islands
- Country: United States Virgin Islands
- Island: Saint Croix
- Time zone: UTC-4 (AST)

Cooper is a settlement on the island of Saint Croix in the United States Virgin Islands.
