= William Cowper (disambiguation) =

William Cowper can refer to

- William Cowper (1731–1800), English poet and hymnodist
- William Cowper (doctor) (1701–1767) English doctor and antiquarian
- William Cowper (anatomist) (1666–1709), English anatomist; eponym of Cowper's gland and Cowper's fluid
- William Couper (bishop) (1568–1619), Scottish bishop
- William Cowper, 1st Earl Cowper (c. 1665–1723), Lord Chancellor of England
- William Cowper (Archdeacon of Cumberland) (1778–1858), Anglican priest in Australia, father of the below
- William Cowper (Dean of Sydney) (1810–1902), Anglican priest in Australia, son of the above
- William Cowper-Temple, 1st Baron Mount Temple (1811–1888), British politician and courtier
- William Cowper (1853–1918), British stage and film actor

== See also ==
- Cowper (surname)
