= Kees Kooper =

Dutch violinist

Kees Kooper (13 May 1923 in Amsterdam – 2 April 2014 in New York City) was a Dutch violinist. He lived in Amsterdam through World War II. A 1951 prizewinner in the Queen Elisabeth Competition, Kooper debuted in the Concertgebouw in Amsterdam. The New York Times wrote of his 1956 New York debut: "a violinist of considerable stature has arrived on the scene… He plays with an eloquence not often heard in our concert halls." He has been soloist in violin concerti of Mozart, Brahms, Tchaikowski, Prokofieff, Barber, Khachaturian, Berg, and others.

Kooper’s chamber music career parallels his solo work. Kooper met his wife, pianist and painter Mary Louise Boehm, while performing, and the pair traveled the world performing as the Kooper-Boehm Duo. Kooper also performed with the New York String Sextet, the Cremona Trio, and other ensembles. His name appears on many recordings. From 1976 to 1988 he was concertmaster of the Netherlands Philharmonic Orchestra in Amsterdam. Kooper held university positions, lectured, and published articles on music. Kooper gave hundreds of concerts in America, Europe, Russia and the Far East. He performed at New York’s Carnegie, Steinway, Merkin and Town Halls, the Metropolitan Museum, the Frick Gallery and other venues. He also appeared twelve times on the Historical Piano Concerts Series.

Kooper and Boehm settled in New York City, where Kooper went on to play for the Metropolitan Opera for 15 years. In 2002 his wife died. Kooper died on April 2, 2014.
