= Cooper River =

Cooper River may refer to:

- Cooper River (New Jersey), a tributary of the Delaware River
- Cooper River (South Carolina), a tributary of the estuary forming Charleston Harbor
  - Cooper River Historic District, near Moncks Corner, Berkeley County, South Carolina

== See also ==
- Cooper Creek, a major inland river in Australia
