= Cooper Lake =

Cooper Lake or Lake Cooper may refer to:

== Places ==
=== United States ===
- Cooper Lake (New York)
- Cooper Lake, Colorado, adjoins Sloan Lake
- Cooper Lake (Texas)
- Cooper Lake (Washington), in the Alpine Lakes Wilderness

=== Australia ===
- Lake Cooper (Victoria), near Corop, Victoria

== Other uses ==
- Cooper Lake (microprocessor), the codename for a processor family developed by Intel as a successor to Cascade Lake
