= Cooper's Bakery =

Bakery chain in Bangladesh

Cooper's Bakery Bangladesh
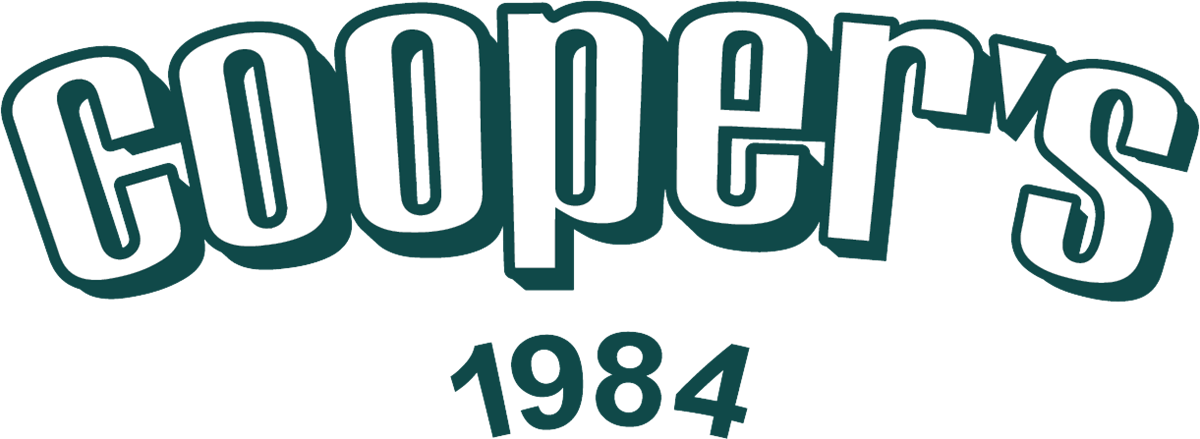
- Founded: 1984; 42 years ago
- Founders: Douglas and Sufia Cooper
- Headquarters: Dhaka, Bangladesh
- Number of locations: 51
- Area served: Bangladesh
- Products: Cakes, desserts, sandwiches, pastry, bread, cookies
- Number of employees: 500
- Website: www.coopersbakery.com

Cooper's Bakery is a bakery chain in Bangladesh. It was founded in 1984 by Douglas Cooper, a Dhaka-based British immigrant and World War II veteran, and his wife Sufia Cooper, who managed the business in the 1990s and 2000s. It introduced the modern pastry shop concept to Bangladesh.

From its original outlet in Kolabagan, Coopers currently operates a total of 52 outlets in Dhaka and Chittagong. It has a factory on the outskirts of Dhaka in Ashulia. The company, as well as sister company Gweebarra Bakery Industries, is managed by brothers John Cooper and Simon Cooper, the children of Douglas and Sufia Cooper. Sufia Cooper died in 2018.
