= Cooper (motorcycles) =

Rebadged American motorcycle brand

Cooper was a rebadged American brand of off-road motorcycles designed by Frank Cooper and manufactured by Moto Islo in Saltillo, Mexico, for distribution in the United States between 1973 and 1975.

== Company history ==
=== Origins ===
The Cooper motorcycle company was created in Burbank, California, in 1972 by Frank Cooper who, was the American distributor for Maico motorcycles. As the baby boomer generation came of age during the 1960s and 1970s, off-road motorcycling experienced a surge in popularity. Cooper sought to fill a void in the motorcycle marketplace between the less expensive, entry level Japanese motorcycles and the more expensive European motorcycles.

Cooper contracted with Isidro Lopez, the owner of a Mexican moped manufacturer named Moto Islo, to build motocross and enduro motorcycles to Cooper's specifications. Using engine parts made in Italy and later, engines made by Sachs, Cooper imported the motorcycles into the United States and sold them as Cooper motorcycles beginning in early 1973. Cooper produced an Enduro 250 cc model designed by Malcolm Smith using an engine based on a Yamaha two-stroke engine in addition to other bikes.

Although the motorcycles were initially well received, they soon developed a reputation for poor quality due to metallurgy failures, poor quality fiberglass parts and deficient quality control during the manufacturing process. Although Cooper addressed most of the reliability issues, the brand's poor reputation persisted. Cooper was also unable to manufacture motorcycles at prices low enough to compete against Japanese motorcycle manufacturers. The combination of a poor reputation along with a higher than anticipated price caused the company to cease operations after producing approximately 1,200 motorcycles.

=== Buyout and rebranding ===
The Cooper motorcycle brand was then purchased by Southern California Yamaha distributor, Don Jones who renamed the brand Ammex. Their intent was to achieve sales success by having Jones' son, three-time motocross national champion Gary Jones compete aboard the motorcycles. The Jones family significantly improved the Ammex over the previous Cooper model. Jones competed on an Ammex motorcycle during the 1976 250cc motocross national championship with his best result being a 10th place at the Sears Point race. However, the brand failed when the Mexican peso was devalued in 1976.

=== Moto Islo ===
Moto Islo also made a trials motorcycle from 1971 to 1975 called GRM (Grapevine Racing Motors) that was imported to the United States, for Bill Grapevine, who designed the bike. The Islo manufacturing facilities and name were bought by Honda around 1982. Since 2000, the brand has resurfaced in the Mexican market under the ownership of Moto Road S.A. de C.V.; the same company that currently owns the Carabela motorcycle brand.
