= Coopers, Georgia =

Unincorporated community in Georgia, U.S.

Coordinates: 32°58′43″N 83°17′07″W

Coopers is an unincorporated community in Baldwin County, in the U.S. state of Georgia.

== History ==
The community was named after Thomas Jefferson Cooper.
