= Coopers Creek (West Virginia) =

Stream in West Virginia, U.S.

Coordinates: 38°24′18″N 81°32′25″W

Coopers Creek is a stream in the U.S. state of West Virginia.

Coopers Creek was named after Leonard Cooper, a pioneer settler.

== See also ==
- List of rivers of West Virginia
