= Cooper Township =

Cooper Township may refer to the following places in the United States:

- Cooper Township, Sangamon County, Illinois
- Cooper Township, Webster County, Iowa
- Cooper Township, Michigan
- Cooper Township, Gentry County, Missouri
- Cooper Township, Clearfield County, Pennsylvania
- Cooper Township, Montour County, Pennsylvania
