= Cooper Creek (Toccoa River tributary) =

Stream in Georgia, U.S.

Coordinates: 34°44′17″N 84°07′26″W

Cooper Creek is a stream in the U.S. state of Georgia. It is a tributary of the Toccoa River.

Cooper Creek was named after Joseph and William Cooper, pioneer citizens.
