= Cooper's Hill, Bedfordshire =

Nature reserve in Bedfordshire, England

Coordinates: 52.027°N 0.503°W

Cooper's Hill
- Site of Special Scientific Interest
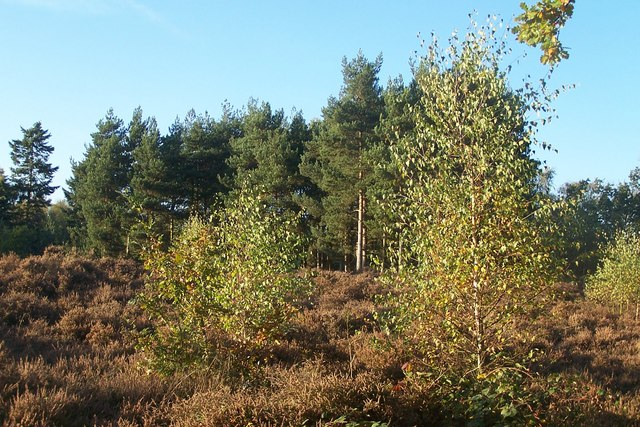
- Location of Cooper's Hill.
- Area of search: Bedfordshire
- Grid reference: TL028376
- Interest: Biological
- Area: 18.1 ha (45 acres)
- Notification date: 1984
- Location map: Magic Map

Cooper's Hill is an 18.1-hectare (45-acre) biological Site of Special Scientific Interest in Ampthill in Bedfordshire. It was notified under Section 28 of the Wildlife and Countryside Act 1981 in 1984, and the planning authority is Central Bedfordshire Council. A smaller area of 12.7 hectares is also a Local Nature Reserve, Part of the site is managed by the Wildlife Trust for Bedfordshire, Cambridgeshire and Northamptonshire. The site is owned by Ampthill Town Council

The site is described by Natural England as the best surviving example in Bedfordshire of heathland on the thin acidic soils of the Lower Greensand Ridge. It also has areas of marsh and woodland.

There is access from Alameda Road and Station Road.
