= Cooper County =

Cooper County may refer to:

- Cooper County, Missouri, United States
- Cooper County, New South Wales, Australia
- Cooper County, Queensland, Australia

== See also ==
- Cowper County, New South Wales, Australia
