= Cupar (disambiguation) =

Cupar is a town and former royal burgh in Fife, Scotland.

Cupar may also refer to:

- Places or things near or in the above town in Fife, Scotland
  - Cupar (Parliament of Scotland constituency), a pre-1707 constituency
  - Cupar Muir, a small settlement in Fife situated beside the town of Cupar
  - Cupar railway station
  - Cupar Castle, a former royal castle at Cupar, Fife, Scotland
  - Cupar Hearts A.F.C.
- HMS Cupar (1918), a Hunt-class minesweeper of the Royal Navy from World War I
- Cupar, Saskatchewan, a town in Saskatchewan province, Canada
  - Rural Municipality of Cupar No. 218, a rural municipality in Saskatchewan, Canada
