= Ruby Mountain (Colorado) =

Mountain summit in Colorado, US

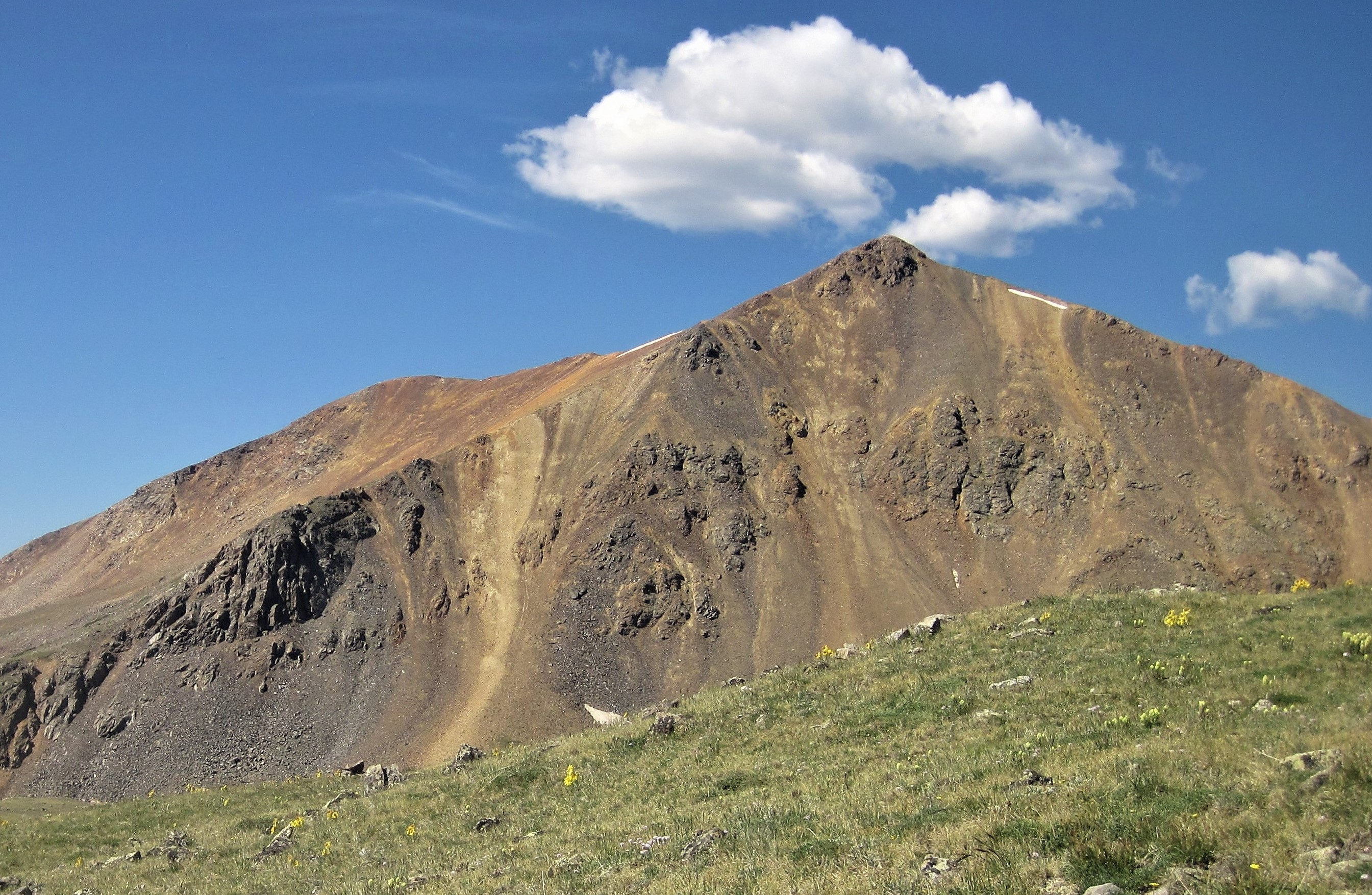
- Northeast aspect

Highest point
- Elevation: 13,277 ft (4,047 m)
- Prominence: 434 ft (132 m)
- Parent peak: Grays Peak (14,278 ft)
- Isolation: 1.21 mi (1.95 km)
- Coordinates: 39°37′00″N 105°48′51″W

Geography
- Location within Colorado Location within the United States
- Country: United States
- State: Colorado
- County: Summit County
- Protected area: White River National Forest
- Parent range: Rocky Mountains; Front Range
- Topo map: USGS Montezuma

Climbing
- Easiest route: class 2

Ruby Mountain is a 13,277-foot-elevation (4,047-meter) mountain summit in Summit County, Colorado, United States.

== Description ==
Ruby Mountain is set less than two miles west of the Continental Divide in the Front Range which is a subrange of the Rocky Mountains. The mountain is located 12 miles (19 km) east of the community of Dillon and is set on land managed by White River National Forest. Precipitation runoff from the mountain drains into Peru Creek → Snake River → Dillon Reservoir → Blue River → Colorado River. Topographic relief is significant as the summit rises 2,400 feet (732 m) above Peru Creek in one mile (1.6 km). The mountain's toponym has been officially adopted by the United States Board on Geographic Names.

== Climate ==
According to the Köppen climate classification system, Ruby Mountain is located in an alpine subarctic climate zone with cold, snowy winters, and cool to warm summers. Due to its altitude, it receives precipitation all year, as snow in winter and as thunderstorms in summer, with a dry period in late spring. Climbers can expect afternoon rain, hail, and lightning from the seasonal monsoon in late July and August.

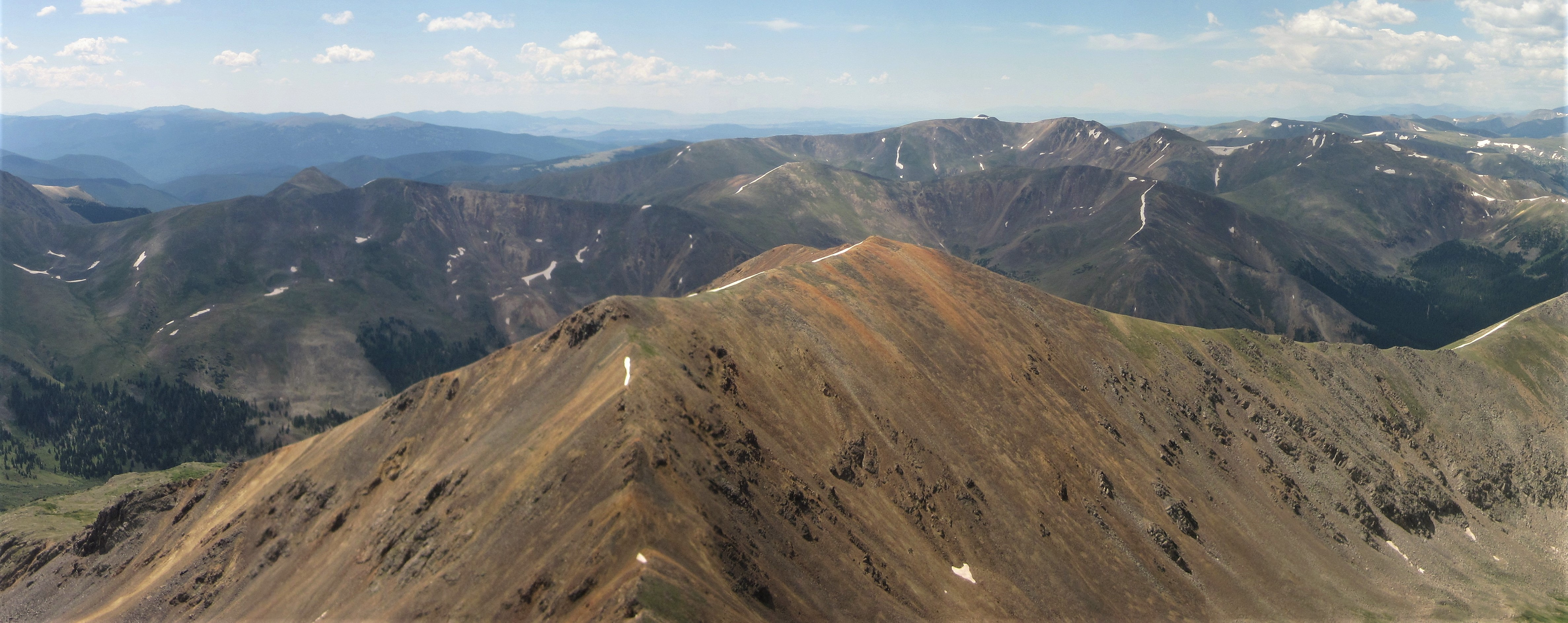
North aspect of Ruby Mountain from Grays Peak

== See also ==
- List of mountain peaks of Colorado
