= Bauer Hockey =

Ice hockey equipment manufacturer

- Formerly: Nike Bauer (2005–2008)
- Industry: Sports equipment
- Founded: 5 May 1934
- Headquarters: Exeter, New Hampshire, United States
- Area served: North America, Europe, Asia
- Products: Ice hockey equipment; Inline skates; Some equipment also used in ringette
- Owner: Fairfax Financial
- Parent: Peak Achievement Athletics (2017–present)
- Website: bauer.com

Bauer Hockey LLC is a North American manufacturer of ice hockey equipment, fitness and recreational skates and apparel. Bauer produces helmets, gloves, sticks, skates, shin guards, pants, shoulder pads, elbow pads, hockey jocks and compression underwear, as well as goalie equipment. Some of its equipment, such as its ice hockey skates, are also approved for use in the sport of ringette.

Bauer developed and manufactured primarily ice hockey skates until 1990, when it acquired the hockey assets of Cooper Canada Ltd. In 2014, Bauer expanded into baseball and softball by purchasing Easton Diamond from Riddell (BRG Sports). Bauer operates as a unit of Peak Achievement Athletics Inc. in New Hampshire.

== History ==
=== Bauer family years, 1934–1965 ===
The origins of the Bauer brand of hockey equipment traces back to 14 September 1906, when the Western Shoe Company Limited was formed in Kitchener, Ontario, on 1927. At an unknown date, Roy Charles Bauer (1895–1989) became president of the company. On 5 May 1934, Bauer formed a new company, the Canada Skate Manufacturing Company Limited, to produce ice skates. By 1934, skate manufacturing was online at the Western Shoe factory at 236 Victoria Street North. According to Roy Bauer, the inspiration for a combined shoe-skate operation came from his wife. He said, "she went shopping for skates and boots for our son Gerald and came home complaining about the inconvenience she had suffered by having to trot all over town." Bauer products were distributed in Canada by the Bauer Shoe Company, and in the United States by Bauer Canadian Skate Inc.

Bauer was the first hockey company to begin producing hockey skates in which the blade was permanently secured to the boot. The boot and blade were made by Bauer. In later years, Bauer Skate's top line was originally marketed under the trade name "Bauer Supreme". The company was further popularized by the prominence of Bobby Bauer, a family member through marriage, as a Bauer married a Bauer, and Hockey Hall of Fame member who starred for the Boston Bruins in the 1930s and 1940s.

In the 1960s and 1970s, the company paid superstar Bobby Hull to endorse their skates. Later, Bobby Clarke and Bernie Parent of the Philadelphia Flyers, Guy Lafleur of the Montreal Canadiens, and Walt Tkaczuk and Brad Park of the New York Rangers were signed to endorsement contracts by Pro Department Manager Bill Vanderburg. These moves, and the introduction soon after of the TUUK chassis, ushered in a new era for the company.

=== Greb ownership, 1965 – 1974 ===
In 1965, Roy Bauer sold his four companies — Western Shoe, Canada Skate, Bauer Shoe, and Bauer Canadian Skate — to Greb Industries Limited, a shoe manufacturer based in Kitchener. Greb Industries had been founded on 27 October 1930 as the Greb Shoe Company Limited.

In the early 1970s, Jim Roberts, also of the Canadiens, began wearing the TUUK blade. High-profile teammates Guy Lafleur, Steve Shutt and Jacques Lemaire soon followed. By 1995, the various Canstar skate brands (Micron, Bauer, etc.) had a 70% NHL market share while their TUUK and ICM holders combined for a 95% share. Bauer no longer offers the ICM holder on player skates, although it is still offered with goalie skates, in addition to the TUUK cowling.

=== Warrington ownership, 1974–1988 ===
In May 1974, Greb announced that it was being acquired by Warrington Products Limited of Toronto. Warrington, a consumer products company, had been founded on 29 August 1969 as W.C.G. Sports Industries Ltd., and in 1971 changed its name to Warrington. The company was 30 per cent owned by Cemp Investments, a holding company set up for the children of Samuel Bronfman after his death. Other Warrington-owned companies included Industrial Plastics Extrusions Company Limited, the Danby Corporation, and the Dominion Luggage Company Limited. The acquisition was completed in the fall of 1974.

Beginning in December 1978, Warrington went on an acquisitions spree. The first purchase was a 50% stake of Gamebridge Inc., which manufactured ice skates and roller skates. This was followed in November 1980 by the purchase of Caber Italia S.p.A., which manufactured ski boots. In late 1980, Gamebridge acquired Trappeur Ltée, another ski boot company. Warrington acquired an additional 47% of Gamebridge in January 1981, then in the spring of that year acquired Icaro Olivieri & Cie S.p.A. – a manufacturer of molds, blades, and buckles – which controlled the remaining 3% of Gamebridge. Finally, on 6 March 1981, Warrington acquired Tuuk Sports Limited of Montreal, a manufacturer of skate blades.

On 14 June 1980, Greb Industries Limited merged into Warrington, making Greb an operating division, and in early 1981 Warrington moved its offices from Kitchener to Montreal. In May 1982, Icaro Olivieri replaced David Simpson as president of Warrington.

In November 1986, Warrington announced that on 1 December of that year, a new subsidiary called Canstar Sports Group Inc. would take over the company's athletic shoe and skate manufacturing operations. In March 1987, Canstar sold the Greb shoe operations in Kitchener to Taurus Shoes of Montreal. At the time, Warrington had an accumulated debt of $74 million and owed shareholders 23.4 million.

=== Canstar ownership, 1988–1995 ===
In early July 1988, Icaro Olivieri, past president of Warrington, arranged to purchase the struggling company for $8.9 million. The 30% share held by Cemp would be acquired jointly by a numbered company owned by Olivieri and by DCC Equities Limited, a subsidiary of Dynamic Capital Corporation. On 2 September 1988, Warrington was renamed Canstar Sports Inc. Olivieri hired Gerald B. Wasserman to turn around the company.

In 1994, Bauer began producing the perforated TUUK chassis, which is the piece of equipment that connects the steel blade to the actual boot of the skate. This allowed skates to be made lighter, as well as more durable.

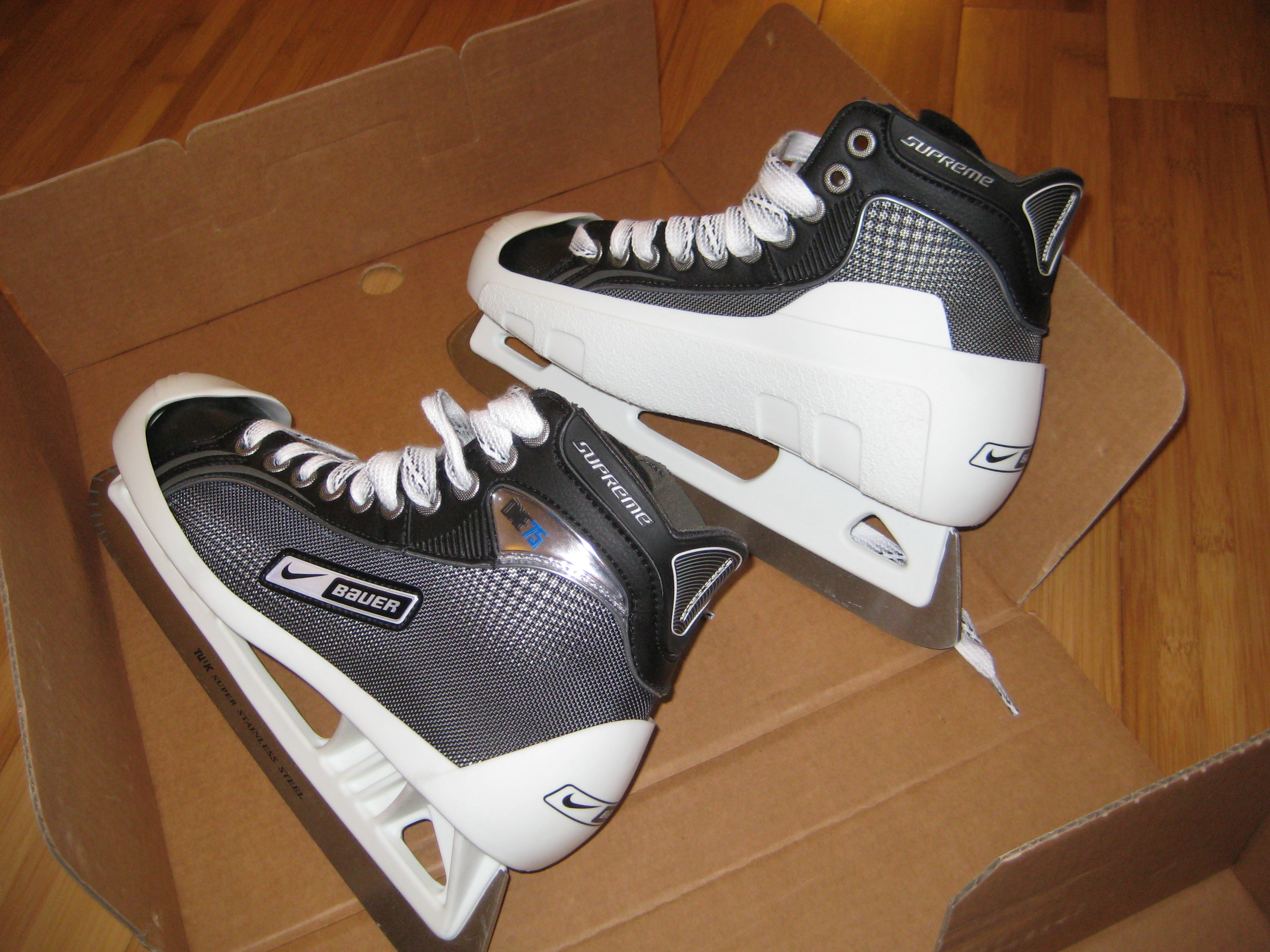
Nike Bauer Supreme One75 goalie skates

=== Nike ownership, 1995–2008 ===
In 1995, Canstar, the parent company of Bauer, became a wholly owned subsidiary of Nike. On 1 June 1995, Canstar Sports was renamed Nike Bauer Hockey Limited. In 2006, beginning with the release of the Nike Bauer Supreme One90, the company's products were rebranded as Nike Bauer. This was the first time Nike had ever used a partner brand name on a product.

=== Independent company, 2008–2017 ===
Nike sold the company to investors Roustan, Inc. and Kohlberg & Co. for $200 million on February 21, 2008, and the company was once again known as Bauer. On 18 April 2008, Nike Bauer Hockey Limited was renamed the Bauer Hockey Corp. In late 2010, the owners of the Bauer Hockey Corp. formed a parent company called Bauer Performance Sports, incorporated in British Columbia. In January 2011, the company filed a prospectus for an initial public offering with the intention to raise $75 million. The offering was underwritten by a consortium of brokers led by Dominion Securities and Wood Gundy. After raising the money, Bauer Performance Sports would acquire the Kohlberg Sports Group Inc. outright. On 10 March 2011, Bauer Performance Sports completed its offering on the Toronto Stock Exchange under the symbol BAU.

On September 25, 2008, Bauer announced the purchase of rival Mission-Itech. Mission and Itech gear was rebranded as Bauer beginning in 2009.

In June 2014, Bauer Performance Sports Limited changed its name to the Performance Sports Group Limited. Sagard Capital Partners LP, a subsidiary of the Power Corporation of Canada, began acquiring Performance Sports Group shares in June 2014 and by late 2016 owned around 17% of the company.

=== Peak Achievement era, 2017–present ===
In October 2016, Performance Sports Group filed for bankruptcy. In January 2017, PSG reached an agreement with Sagard Capital Partners and Fairfax Financial Holdings Ltd to sell Bauer's assets for $575 million. The sale gave Sagard 74% of Bauer, while Fairfax held 26%. On 11 October 2016, a new Canadian federal corporation called Peak Achievement Athletics Inc. was incorporated to hold Bauer's operations. On 7 February 2017, the old Bauer Hockey Corp. was wound down and the company's operations were incorporated newly in Delaware as Bauer Hockey LLC. On August 3, 2021, Bauer acquired ProSharp AB, a skate sharpening company based in Sweden. At the end of 2023, Fairfax's share of Peak Achievement had increased to 43%. In September 2024, Fairfax reached an agreement with Sagard to buy out the latter's stake and become the sole owner of Peak Achievement.
