= Cooper Canada =

Canadian sporting and leather goods manufacturer

- Formerly: General Leather Goods (1905-1949); Cooper Weeks (1949-1971)
- Fate: Acquired by Bauer Hockey
- Headquarters: Toronto, Ontario

Cooper Canada Ltd. was a sporting goods and fine leather goods manufacturer based in Toronto, Ontario, Canada. In its heyday, the 1960s through to the 1980s, the company was Canada's leading producer of fine leathergoods, hockey, baseball and lacrosse equipment. The company pioneered team-coloured hockey equipment and the use of nylon, foam, and modern plastics in equipment manufacturing.

== Inception ==
Cecil John Weeks, a nephew by marriage of General Leather Goods owner R.H. Cameron, worked with Cameron, who had founded the company in 1905. Jack Cooper, who also worked with GLG, joined Weeks in purchasing the company in 1949. (Cooper had joined the company of 15 employees in 1932 as their first salesman) The company was re-styled as Cooper Weeks. In 1954 Jack Cooper bought out his partner, Cecil Weeks, but the company continued to be named 'Cooper-Weeks' until 1971, when it was changed to Cooper Canada to coincide with the company going 'public' with 40% of its shares being traded on the Toronto Stock Exchange. Cooper Canada was sold to Charon Industries in 1987.

== Innovation ==
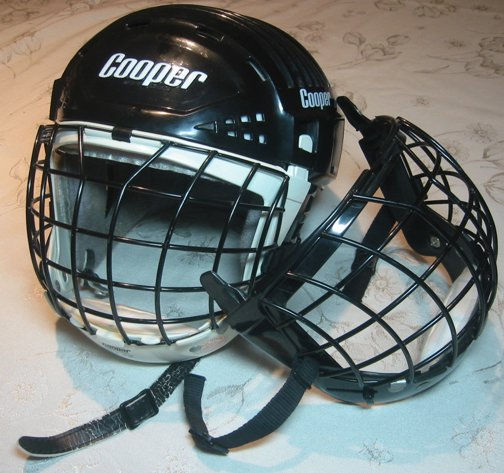
The Cooper XL7 hockey helmet, formerly used in the NHL and derided as unsafe, is now prized by collectors.

Prior to Cooper and Weeks's purchase, the company made leather coin purses, key cases and business portfolios along with ski and snowshoe harness sets. With the Great Depression impacting sales, they switched focus to economy-priced protective ice hockey shin guards (in 1933) and gloves (in 1935). Frank Selke, manager of the Montreal Canadiens in the 1950s and early 1960s, worked with Cooper to decrease the weight and improve the durability and safety of hockey equipment. In 1969, the company introduced the plastic hockey stick replacement blade widely used in road hockey. In 1955 the company became the Canadian Licensee to produce and market Buxton leathergoods in the Canadian market. Buxton was a US-based company and a leader in the fine leathergoods industry.

Cooper employees and customers worked closely together to develop innovations like goaltenders' throat protection and professional grade lacrosse equipment. In the 1970s, when few professional athletes were paid to endorse equipment, Dave Dryden, brother of Ken Dryden, assisted the company in their Custom Pro Shop, sharing his latest thoughts on how to improve goaltenders' protective gear.

== Expansion ==
Following the July 5, 1972 acquisition of hockey stick and baseball bat maker Hespeler-St. Mary's Wood Specialties Ltd. from the Seagram family, the company expanded into the bat market, with Major League Baseball finally approving their bats on March 27, 1986. The bats gained popularity with such players as Tony Fernández, Buck Martínez, Tim Raines, Paul Molitor, Kelly Gruber, Jesse Barfield, Cecil Fielder, Joe Carter, and Hubie Brooks, and were the first Canadian-made bats used in major league play. The factory maxed out production capacity to gain 30% market share in baseball bat sales by 1988, remaining number two behind Louisville Slugger. A move of the production facilities in 1996 coincided with the decline of professional use of Cooper bats.

== Product criticism ==
Some Cooper products met with limited consumer acceptance. A hockey pant and girdle called Cooperalls, Cooper hinged DG32 shin pads, and the Cooper XL7 helmet have been named by critics among the worst hockey products of all time, though its widely unknown that Cooperalls became a surprisingly popular design in junior hockey and the Canadian sports of ringette and broomball. Cooperalls have not only had newer designs based on Cooper Canada's initial concept, but started an official trend in the sport of ringette; today, long sport pants for wear on the ice, a.k.a. "ringette pants" are now the accepted official part of an equipment kit in the sports ringette and broomball. They were designed by Steve Copeland and Len Clement of Cooper Design Group. Though used in the National Hockey League, the Cooper XL7 helmet met with particular criticism as being unsafe because of a plastic clip that could break upon face checking or puck impacts, detaching the faceguard. (This same faceguard is now prized among collectors for its use in the construction of replicas of Crow T. Robot, the puppet robot from the 1990s television series Mystery Science Theater 3000.)

== Dissolution ==
Canstar Sports Inc., the parent company of hockey product manufacturer Bauer Hockey, acquired the hockey division of Cooper in 1990, and was itself acquired by Nike five years later. Former Cooper lead staff purchased the baseball bat manufacturing division in spring 1999 to form KR3.

Jack Cooper was elected to the U.S. National Sporting Goods Association's Sporting Goods Industry Hall of Fame in 1979 and the Canadian Business Hall of Fame in 1989.

In Ireland, the Cooper brand is used for GAA equipment since Cooper ice hockey helmets made their way into hurling during the 1960s. By now, Cooper is "seen as the market leader" of hurling equipment in Ireland.
