= Bike (disambiguation) =

A bike, or bicycle, is a two-wheeled, pedal-driven vehicle.

Bike may also refer to:

== Arts, entertainment, and media ==
- Bike (band), a 1990s New Zealand pop band fronted by Andrew Brough
- Bike (magazine), a UK magazine about motorcycling
- "Bike" (song), by Pink Floyd
- Bike (TV channel), a defunct sports channel in Italy and the UK
- "Bike" (Bluey), an episode of the first season of the animated TV series Bluey

== Other uses ==
- Bike (given name), a common Turkish given name
- Bike, Ethiopia
- BIKE Athletic Company, an American sportswear company
- Motorbike, a two-wheeled motor vehicle

== See also ==
- Quad bike, or all-terrain vehicle
- Bike Magazine (disambiguation)
- Biker (disambiguation)
- Bic (disambiguation)
- Bik (disambiguation)
