= Bcycle =

Bcycle, b-cycle, or variation, may refer to:

- BCycle, public bikeshare subsidiary of Trek Bicycle, based in Waterloo, Wisconsin, USA; with bike programs spread across the U.S.
- San Antonio B-Cycle, public bikeshare program in San Antonio, Texas, USA
- Houston Bcycle, public bikeshare program operated by Houston Bike Share, in Houston, Texas, USA
- Bicycle, a human-powered, two-wheeled vehicle, with front and aft wheels

== See also ==
- B (disambiguation)
- Cycle (disambiguation)
- Bicycle (disambiguation)
- Bicyclic
