= Bick =

Bick may refer to:

== People ==
- Charity Bick (1925–2002), George Medal recipient
- Charles O. Bick (1909–1994), Canadian administrator
- Donald Bick (1936–1992), British cricketer
- Eckhard Bick (born 1958), German linguist
- Esther Bick (1902–1983), Polish psychologist
- Gabriel Bick (born 1999), American chess player
- Ilsa J. Bick, American author
- Jacob Samuel Bick (1772–1831), Austrian author
- Jamie Bick (born 2000), German actress
- Marjorie Bick (1915–2013), Australian biochemist
- Patrick Bick (born 1977), German footballer
- Sam Bick (born 1955), American soccer player
- Bick Campbell (1898–1967), American baseball umpire

== Other uses ==
- Bick's Pickle, Canadian food brand
- Members of the Rapoport-Bick (rabbinic dynasty) who used Bick as their last name, often alone
- Anvil

== See also ==
- Alexander Bicks (1901–1963), American judge
- Jenny Bicks, American television producer
- Bicks Ndoni (1958–2020), South African politician
- Bic (disambiguation)
- Bik (disambiguation)
- Moore-Bick, a surname
