= Bicycle (disambiguation) =

A bicycle is a two-wheeled, pedal-driven vehicle.

Bicycle or bicycles may also refer to:

- Bicycle (graph theory), a minimal graph that is not a pseudoforest
- An ace-to-five straight, a type of poker hand
- Bicycle crunch, an abdominal exercise
- Bicycle kick, a way of kicking a ball in various sports
- Bicycle Playing Cards, a brand of the United States Playing Card Company
- Bicycle (documentary), a 2014 documentary film about the history and culture of the bicycle in Great Britain.

== Music ==
- The Bicycles, a Canadian band
- Bicycle (song), song by Chung Hua
- "Bicycle Race", sometimes called "Bicycle", song by Queen
- "Bicycle", a song by the Nico Touches the Walls from the 2011 album Humania
- "Bicycle", a song by Unknown Mortal Orchestra from the 2011 album Unknown Mortal Orchestra
- "Bicycle", a song by Jay Chou from the 2007 album Secret

== See also ==
- Bi (disambiguation)
- Bcycle (disambiguation)
- Bicyclic
- Bi cycle
- Romance languages: Bicicleta (disambiguation)
- Bike (disambiguation)
- Cycle (disambiguation)
