= Kukeli =

Kukeli may refer to:

- Burim Kukeli (b. 1984), Kosovan - Albanian footballer
- Kukeli, Iran
