= Takmaran Rural District =

Rural district in North Khorasan province, Iran

Takmaran Rural District Persian: دهستان تكمران
- Rural District
- Location within Iran
- Coordinates: 37°37′N 57°46′E
- Country: Iran
- Province: North Khorasan
- County: Shirvan
- District: Sarhad
- Established: 1987
- Capital: Tukur

Population (2016)
  - Total: 4,882
- Time zone: UTC+3:30 (IRST)

Takmaran Rural District (Persian: دهستان تكمران) is in Sarhad District of Shirvan County, North Khorasan province, Iran. Its capital is the village of Tukur.

== Demographics ==
=== Population ===
At the time of the 2006 National Census, the rural district's population was 5,204 in 1,236 households. There were 5,102 inhabitants in 1,290 households at the following census of 2011. The 2016 census measured the population of the rural district as 4,882 in 1,398 households. The most populous of its 22 villages was Tupkanlu, with 721 people.

=== Other villages in the rural district ===
- Beyk
- Gugeli
- Qulanlu-ye Olya
- Qulanlu-ye Sofla
