= Bicicleta =

Bicicleta is the Portuguese, Spanish, Catalan, Galician and Romanian word for bicycle, and may refer to:

- Bicicleta (album), 1980 album recorded by Serú Girán
- "Bicicleta" (short story), by Orson Scott Card
- "La Bicicleta", 2017 song by Carlos Vives and Shakira, off the album Vives
- Bicycle kick, often referred to as bicicletas in football (soccer)

== See also ==
- The dictionary definition of bicicletta at Wiktionary
- Toño Bicicleta (1943-1995; "Bicycle Tony") Puerto Rican criminal
- Bicycle (disambiguation)
