= Russell Brands =

American corporation

Russell Brands, LLC
- Type: Subsidiary
- Industry: Sports equipment
- Founded: 1973; 53 years ago as "Russell Corporation" in Alexander City, Alabama
- Defunct: 2006; 20 years ago
- Fate: Acquired by Fruit of the Loom in 2006
- Headquarters: Bowling Green, Kentucky, United States
- Area served: Worldwide
- Key people: Eugene C. Gwaltney, Jr.
- Products: Clothing, athletic shoes, sports equipment, accessories
- Revenue: US$1.438 billion
- Owner: Berkshire Hathaway
- Number of employees: 10,000
- Parent: Fruit of the Loom
- Subsidiaries: Russell Athletic, Spalding
- Website: fotlinc.com

Russell Brands, LLC was an American corporation that manufactured sports equipment, marketing its products under many brands and subsidiaries, such as Russell Athletic (its flagship brand) and Spalding. Formerly a publicly traded company, Russell Brands was acquired by Fruit of the Loom, a wholly owned subsidiary of Berkshire Hathaway, in 2006.

== History ==
=== Russell Corp. established ===
The original "Russell Manufacturing Company" was founded by Benjamin Russell (1876-1931) in 1902 in Alexander City, Alabama. It became known as "Russell Corporation" in 1973, during the corporate presidency of Eugene C. Gwaltney Jr. (1918-2000), which he had assumed in 1968.

By 1990, the company owned and operated 13 sewing plants outside Alexander City and employed 15,000 workers. Since 1976, sales revenues had increased by 13 percent annually. With the acquisition of two subsidiaries, Quality Mills in North Carolina and Cloathbond Ltd. in Scotland, in 1988 and 1989 respectively, the company had become a global contender in the sportswear industry.

Under president and CEO John C. Adams, Russell Corporation had become the top manufacturer of athletic uniforms in the US. In 1992, the company was awarded a five-year contract to be the exclusive producer and marketer of athletic uniforms for most MLB teams. The contract also stipulated that the company held the exclusive right to manufacture and market replicas of major league uniforms, T-shirts and shorts. This put the company in an advantageous position in relation to its main rival, Champion, Inc., the supplier of uniforms to the NBA teams. In 1992 alone, Russell's international sales increased by 40 percent over 1991.

=== Major restructuring ===
Russell Brands' sales and net income reached record levels in 1996, in part because of the impact of the 1996 Summer Olympics in Atlanta. Their sales and net income began to decrease in 1997, however, due to intensifying competition, as industry-wide over-capacity and price-cutting by rivals forced Russell to lower its own prices. Particularly troubled was the Licensed Products Division, which Russell dissolved in 1997, dividing its operations among the other divisions. In 1997, Russell also ended its licensing deals with the professional football, basketball and hockey leagues.

In early 1998, as the company's troubles continued, Adams retired. John "Jack" Ward stepped in as chairman, president and CEO. Within months of his arrival, Russell announced a major restructuring. Over a three-year period, the company planned to eliminate about 4,000 jobs, or 23 percent of its workforce; close about 25 of its 90 plants, distribution centers and other facilities; and move most of the final assembly of garments abroad, to Mexico, Honduras and elsewhere in the Caribbean basin. The company expected to take charges of $100 to $125 million during the restructuring period. Russell hoped these efforts would result in annual savings of $50–$70 million. Part of these funds would then be used to bolster the marketing and advertising of Russell's brands, including tripling the advertising budget to $25 million per year. Russell also established a second headquarters in Atlanta in February 1999.

Restructuring charges led Russell to post a net loss for fiscal year 1998 of $10.4 million on revenues of $1.18 billion. Results for the first half of 1999 also showed a net loss of $12.9 million but the restructuring had resulted in a decrease in selling, general and administration costs of 13 percent. Russell had also increased its offshore apparel assembly to 55 percent of total capacity, a substantial increase from the 17 percent level before the restructuring was launched. Russell had far to go before it could be considered fully turned around, but it appeared that the company was well on its way.

The company completed its restructuring process in 2001. Nearly all of its retail outlets had been closed, over 6,000 jobs had been cut, and most of its manufacturing operations had moved abroad. In 2000, Russell Corp. acquired the apparel operations for Haas Outdoors, Inc.. This later became the Mossy Oak Apparel Company. In 2002, the company added the Bike Athletic Company and Spalding to its holding. Russell continued its acquisition spree in 2004 by purchasing American Athletic Inc. (AAI), Huffy Corp.'s sports division and Brooks Sports. It also secured an extended contract to provide Spalding and Huffy branded products to the National Basketball Association.

The company faced challenges in 2005 due to rising costs and falling sales. During Hurricanes Rita and Katrina, over 40 containers of Russell products were lost or destroyed and nearly 70 percent of the ports it used for shipping were closed. Amid intense competition and faltering profits, the company launched a restructuring plan much like the effort of the late 1990s. Russell continued shifting its manufacturing base overseas and cut a total of 2,300 jobs.

Conglomerate Berkshire Hathaway Inc. acquired Russell Corporation for $600 million in early 2006. Berkshire, led by the billionaire Warren Buffett, believed Russell would be a good fit with its Fruit of the Loom Inc. subsidiary.

== Brands ==
The Russell Corporation was made up of the following brands and their products:

Brand	Products	Year added
Russell Athletic	Clothing (Note: Uniforms for college and school teams)	1902
Spalding	Balls, accessories	2003
Jerzees	T-shirts	1992
Bike	Protections	2002
Brooks	Athletic shoes, clothing	2004
Dudley	Softball balls and accessories	2003
American Athletic	Gymnastics' tables, bars, rings, horses	2004

== Honduran labor controversy and boycott ==
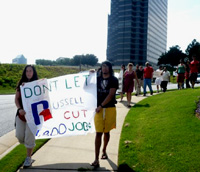
Members of United Students Against Sweatshops march outside of Russell Corporation's offices in Atlanta, GA.

Since January 2009, Russell faced the largest collegiate boycott of an apparel company in history over labor violations in its Honduran factories. The boycott was co-ordinated by United Students Against Sweatshops in the United States and Canada in support of the Honduran garment workers' union SITRAJERZEESH.

The Worker Rights Consortium has documented violations of the rights of workers by Russell in its factory Jerzees de Honduras. The report found that Russell illegally fired nearly 2,000 in two of its factories, in retaliation for employees protesting against working conditions and forming a union. The report also stated that death threats were allegedly made against some members of the union, though not by senior management.

In response, over eighty universities have canceled their contracts with Russell, including Duke University, Georgetown University, Columbia University, University of Michigan, University of Miami, University of Maryland, University of Washington, University of Houston, Penn State University, Rutgers University, University of Minnesota-Twin Cities, University of Wisconsin–Madison, Purdue University, Cornell University, University of Florida, and the University of Aberdeen in Scotland.

On May 13, 2009, sixty-five members of Congress wrote to Russell CEO John Holland to express their concern over the labor violations. On June 25, 2009, Russell became the first collegiate licensee to be placed on probation by the Fair Labor Association.

At first, Russell said it was being unfairly targeted by the garment workers' union and student activists, and that the plant closure was due to the general downturn in the world economy. Five schools announced they planned to continue doing business with Russell. However, at least one of those, the University of Florida, has since terminated its licensing deal with Russell. The company had issued a statement noting that it had recognized the unionization of the Jerzees de Honduras plant on October 3, 2007. In later statements, the company admitted wrongdoing, although the violations are yet to be resolved.,

== Sponsorships ==
Throughout its history, Russell Corporation was involved in the manufacturing and selling of equipment for many professional, collegiate and high school sports teams. Most notable of these are its stint of manufacturing uniforms for MLB (through its flagship brand, Russell Athletic), the production of official basketballs for the NBA (through its subsidiary Spalding), and the production of official footballs for the AFL (under the Sherrin Brand).

== See also ==
- Russell Athletic
- Fruit of the Loom
