= Russell Athletic =

American clothing manufacturer

- Type: Subsidiary
- Industry: Textile
- Founded: 1902; 124 years ago in Alexander City, Alabama
- Founder: Benjamin Russell
- Headquarters: Bowling Green, Kentucky, United States
- Area served: North America, Europe
- Products: Casual wear, sportswear
- Owner: Berkshire Hathaway
- Parent: Fruit of the Loom (2006-present)
- Website: russellathletic.com

Russell Athletic is an American clothing manufacturer based in Bowling Green, Kentucky. Currently a subsidiary of global company Fruit of the Loom, Russell Athletic was the main brand of Russell Brands, LLC. until its acquisition in 2006.

Founded in 1902, the company produced team uniforms for a wide range of sports, such as American football, basketball, baseball, softball, and volleyball. Russell Athletic supplied jersey uniforms and apparel for many professional sports teams of the major professional sports leagues in the United States and Canada, and also high schools, colleges, universities, and minor league teams, until it shut down its team uniform division in 2017. Nevertheless, manufacturing of team uniforms restarted in 2018 through an agreement with Georgia-based company Augusta Sportswear.

Russell Athletic makes casual wear, producing t-shirts, hoodies, jackets, sweatpants, shorts and underwear. It also manufactures American football, baseball/softball, and basketball uniforms in its partnership with Augusta Sportswear.

== History ==
=== Founding ===
The company was founded by Benjamin Russell in Alexander City, Alabama, in 1902. The original mill produced women's undershirts and children's undergarments. The mills beginning capacity was 150 garments daily. During the 1910s, Russell Manufacturing Co. become an established business. In 1920 Russell Sr. & Jr. created the first cotton jersey that is now known as the sweatshirt. By 1925 long underwear, sweaters, athletic shirts, and women's bloomers were added to the production of women's vests, making a more complete product line.

In 1932 Russell acquired Southern Manufacturing Company, which gave the company access to athletic team apparel, and the company became Russell Southern. This was the beginning of the Russell Athletic division's cutting and sewing operations. Later in 1938, Russell began making woven athletic garments, including basketball, baseball, and football pants and jackets.

=== Expansion ===
In 1941, founder Benjamin Russell died on December 16 and the reins of the company were passed to his son Benjamin C. Russell. During World War II, Russell's 'Athletic' Division sold primarily to the military. Shirts, drawers, T-shirts, athletic garments, and special outer garments were made for the Army and Navy. Benjamin C. Russell died in 1945 and was succeeded as president by his brother, Thomas D. Russell. After the War, the company embarked on further expansion and development throughout its knitting, weaving, dyeing, finishing, and cutting departments.

During the 1960s, the 'Athletic' division was the largest marketer and manufacturer of athletic apparel and uniforms in the country. In 1962, Russell Manufacturing Company's name was changed to Russell Mills, Inc. In 1973, Russell Mills' name was changed to the Russell Corporation, and the company expanded manufacturing across the Southern USA, also to Latin America and Scotland.

In 1992, Russell Athletic dealt a 5 year contract to serve as the exclusive producer and marketer of athletic uniforms for most Major League Baseball (MLB) teams. The contract also stipulated that the company held the exclusive right to manufacture and market replicas of major league uniforms, T-shirts, and shorts.

By 1995, Russell Athletic was the official supplier of team uniforms for 25 of (the then) 28 MLB teams, outfitted more NFL teams than any other company, and was still the largest manufacturer of athletic uniforms in the U.S. Meanwhile, the contract with MLB was extended to 1999 (by which time the league had expanded to 30 teams); after which there was no exclusive uniform supplier to MLB, but continued to supply uniforms to some MLB teams through the end of the 2004 season, when Majestic Athletic became the exclusive supplier to uniforms to MLB, a partnership which began the next year in 2005 and continued until the end of the 2019 season, when Nike took over the MLB uniform contract starting in 2020.

=== Acquisition ===
On April 17, 2006, Berkshire Hathaway agreed to purchase 100% of Russell. Finally on August 1, 2006, Russell shareholders approved the sale of their firm to Berkshire Hathaway for $18.00 per share in cash. The acquisition was successfully completed on the following day. Russell's brands joined Fruit of the Loom in the Berkshire Hathaway family of products.

=== International operations ===
Over the last decade Russell Athletic expanded under licence of Russell Brands to a number of markets around the world focusing on their signature authentic American sportswear and the story behind the invention of the sweatshirt. The largest market outside the USA is based on Europe, with "Russell Europe" division operating in the continent through a licensee agreement between Future Brands Ltd. (a subsidiary of the Batra Group) and Brand Machine Group. Following their success in Europe, Russell Athletic also operates in other regions of the world including Australia, Japan and South Africa.

Russell Athletic has had a team of brand ambassadors representing the brand in their local markets, ranging from Olympic swimmers Stephanie Rice and Ellie Faulkner to number of professional rugby union and rugby league players in England and South Africa such as Sailosi Tagicakibau, Cheslin Kolbe, Shaun Lunt, Ryan Atkins, and Stevie Ward and professional health ambassadors and Yoga ambassadors such as Samantha Laura Kaye.

=== Refocus and reversal ===
On September 28, 2017, Russell Athletic said it would be exiting the team uniform manufacturing business after 115 years, and the company would be refocused on activewear for the consumer apparel market. The company cited that companies like Nike, Adidas, and Under Armour (which all started making athletic footwear) starting their own team uniform units, and as a result eating away at Russell's market share in that department was a contributing factor in discontinuing Russell's team uniform manufacturing business. However, the company reversed course shortly after and restarted its uniform manufacturing department, via a partnership with Georgia-based Augusta Sportswear. The agreement had been announced by both companies in June 2018.

== Sponsorships ==
=== Past sponsorships ===
==== American football ====
Many teams of the NFL wore uniforms (in addition to jerseys for retail from the league starting in the 1980s) provided by Russell Athletic during the 1980s to the 1990s:

- Cleveland Browns (1992–95)
- Tampa Bay Buccaneers (1989, 1992–95)
- Arizona Cardinals (1992–96)
- San Diego Chargers (1993)
- Dallas Cowboys (1990–92)
- Philadelphia Eagles (1992–96)
- Atlanta Falcons (1992–96)
- Houston Oilers (1989, 1992–93)
- Los Angeles Rams (1993–96)
- Baltimore Ravens (1996)
- Minnesota Vikings (1993)

==== Indoor football ====
- Arena Football League

==== Australian football ====
- Adelaide (2003–05)
- Brisbane Lions (2001–06)
- Fremantle (2001–04)
- North Melbourne (2001–04)

==== Baseball ====
- MLB – all teams (1992–2004; both team-issued uniforms and jerseys for retail)
- Little League Baseball – all teams

==== Basketball ====
- Harlem Globetrotters (2010–13)

==== Formula One ====
- MTV Simtek-Ford

==== Colleges ====
- Appalachian State
- Carroll College
- College of DuPage
- Georgia Tech
- Johnson C. Smith Golden Bulls
- Lincoln Lions
- Auburn University
- Mississippi State University
- Pomona Pitzer
- Prairie View A&M Panthers
- Samford Bulldogs
- West Texas A&M Buffaloes
- University of Southern Mississippi
