= Biker subculture =

Biker subculture may refer to:

- Motorcycling subculture, chiefly British English
- Outlaw motorcycle clubs in US English
- Bicycle culture

== See also ==
- Biker (disambiguation)
