= Houston Bcycle =

Bike sharing system in Houston, Texas, United States

Houston BCycle

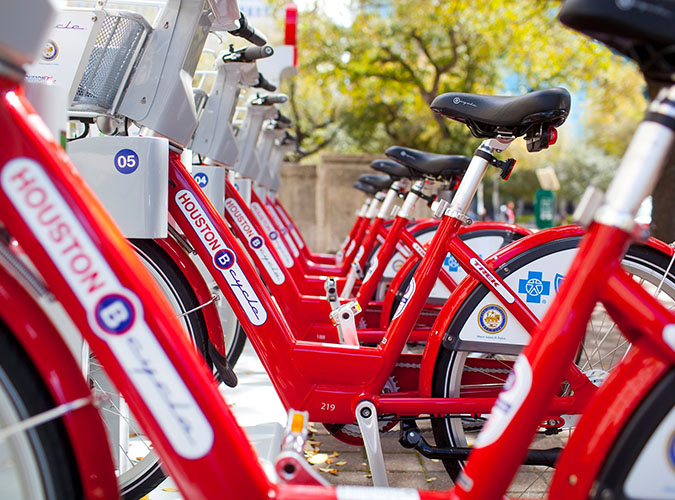
- One of 38 stations in the Houston BCycle network

Overview
- Locale: Houston, Texas, United States
- Transit type: Bicycle-sharing system
- Number of stations: 150+
- Website: houstonbcycle.com

Operation
- Began operation: May 2012; 14 years ago
- Ended operation: June 30, 2024; 2 years ago
- Operator: Houston Bike Share
- Number of vehicles: 1300

Houston BCycle was a bicycle-sharing system, owned and operated by Houston Bike Share, a non-profit organization that administers bike sharing for the City of Houston. There were over 150 stations located within the city limits, and over 1300 bicycles. Since June 30, 2024, the ride-sharing program has been discontinued.

== History ==
Houston BCycle was launched in May 2012 with 18 bikes at three stations. The system later expanded to 1300+ bikes at 150+ stations. Houston BCycle provides a quick and active transportation, alternative for getting around the city with environmental and health benefits.

In May 2013, Houston BCycle expanded from three to 25 stations and 215 bikes. This was made possible through a DOE grant, which created a presence not only in downtown, but also in the East End, Midtown, Houston, Montrose District, and the Houston Museum District–with four of the stations located at key METRORail stops. In January 2013, a partnership with BlueCross BlueShield of Texas provided Houston BCycle with further operational funding.

In September 2013, Coca-Cola Co.'s foundation contributed funds to open up its 29th station at Clayton Homes 1919 Runnels. The program aims to expand to 1,000 bikes at 100 stations by 2020, with discussions and planning including the Texas Medical Center and local universities, as well as additional neighborhoods such as Houston Heights, Midtown, Houston and Montrose, Houston.

== See also ==
- Citibike, in New York City
- Capital Bikeshare, in Washington, DC
- Barclays Cycle Hire, in London
- Nice Ride Minnesota, in Minneapolis and Saint Paul
