= Qulanlu-ye Sofla =

Village in North Khorasan province, Iran

Qulanlu-ye Sofla Persian: قولانلوسفلي
- Village
- Location within Iran
- Coordinates: 37°36′39″N 57°48′41″E
- Country: Iran
- Province: North Khorasan
- County: Shirvan
- District: Sarhad
- Rural District: Takmaran

Population (2016)
  - Total: 490
- Time zone: UTC+3:30 (IRST)

Qulanlu-ye Sofla (Persian: قولانلوسفلي) (Note: Also romanized as Qūlānlū-ye Soflá; also known as Qūlānlū and Qūlānlū-ye Pā’īn) is a village in Takmaran Rural District of Sarhad District in Shirvan County, North Khorasan province, Iran.

== Demographics ==
=== Population ===
At the time of the 2006 National Census, the village's population was 351 in 95 households. The following census in 2011 counted 368 people in 109 households. The 2016 census measured the population of the village as 490 people in 143 households.
