= Bound state =

Quantum physics terminology

A bound state is a composite of two or more fundamental building blocks, such as particles, atoms, or bodies, that behaves as a single object and in which energy is required to split them.

In quantum physics, a bound state is a quantum state of a particle subject to a potential such that the particle has a tendency to remain localized in one or more regions of space. The potential may be external or it may be the result of the presence of another particle; in the latter case, one can equivalently define a bound state as a state representing two or more particles whose interaction energy exceeds the total energy of each separate particle. One consequence is that, given a potential vanishing at infinity, negative-energy states must be bound. The energy spectrum of the set of bound states are most commonly discrete, unlike scattering states of free particles, which have a continuous spectrum.

Although not bound states in the strict sense, metastable states with a net positive interaction energy, but long decay time, are often considered unstable bound states as well and are called "quasi-bound states". Examples include radionuclides and Rydberg atoms.

In relativistic quantum field theory, a stable bound state of n particles with masses $\{m_k\}_{k=1}^n$ corresponds to a pole in the S-matrix with a center-of-mass energy less than $\textstyle\sum_k m_k$. An unstable bound state shows up as a pole with a complex center-of-mass energy.

== Examples ==
An overview of the various families of elementary and composite particles, and the theories describing their interactions

- A proton and an electron can move separately; when they do, the total center-of-mass energy is positive, and such a pair of particles can be described as an ionized atom. Once the electron starts to "orbit" the proton, the energy becomes negative, and a bound state – namely the hydrogen atom – is formed. Only the lowest-energy bound state, the ground state, is stable. Other excited states are unstable and will decay into stable (but not other unstable) bound states with less energy by emitting a photon.
- A positronium "atom" is an unstable bound state of an electron and a positron. It decays into photons.
- Any state in the quantum harmonic oscillator is bound, but has positive energy. Note that $\lim_{x\to\pm\infty}{V_{\text{QHO}}(x)} = \infty$ , so the below does not apply.
- A nucleus is a bound state of protons and neutrons (nucleons).
- The proton itself is a bound state of three quarks (two up and one down; one red, one green and one blue). However, unlike the case of the hydrogen atom, the individual quarks can never be isolated. See confinement.
- The Hubbard and Jaynes–Cummings–Hubbard (JCH) models support similar bound states. In the Hubbard model, two repulsive bosonic atoms can form a bound pair in an optical lattice. The JCH Hamiltonian also supports two-polariton bound states when the photon-atom interaction is sufficiently strong.

== Definition ==
Let σ-finite measure space $(X, \mathcal A, \mu)$ be a probability space associated with separable complex Hilbert space $H$. Define a one-parameter group of unitary operators $(U_t)_{t\in \mathbb{R}}$, a density operator $\rho = \rho(t_0)$ and an observable $T$ on $H$. Let $\mu(T,\rho)$ be the induced probability distribution of $T$ with respect to $\rho$. Then the evolution

$$\rho(t_0)\mapsto [U_t(\rho)](t_0) = \rho(t_0 +t)$$

is bound with respect to $T$ if

$$\lim_{R \rightarrow \infty}{\sup_{t \geq t_0}{\mu(T,\rho(t))(\mathbb{R}_{> R})}} = 0$$,

where $\mathbb{R}_{>R} = \lbrace x \in \mathbb{R} \mid x > R \rbrace$.

A quantum particle is in a bound state if at no point in time it is found "too far away" from any finite region $R\subset X$. Using a wave function representation, for example, this means

$$\begin{align}
0 &= \lim_{R\to\infty}{\mathbb{P}(\text{particle measured inside }X\setminus R)} \\
&= \lim_{R\to\infty}{\int_{X\setminus R}|\psi(x)|^2\,d\mu(x)},
\end{align}$$

such that

$$\int_X{|\psi(x)|^{2}\,d\mu(x)} < \infty.$$

In general, a quantum state is a bound state if and only if it is finitely normalizable for all times $t\in\mathbb{R}$ and remains spatially localized. Furthermore, a bound state lies within the pure point part of the spectrum of $T$ if and only if it is an eigenvector of $T$.

More informally, "boundedness" results foremost from the choice of domain of definition and characteristics of the state rather than the observable. (Note: See Expectation value (quantum mechanics) for an example.) For a concrete example: let $H := L^2(\mathbb{R})$ and let $T$ be the position operator. Given compactly supported $\rho = \rho(0) \in H$ and $[-1,1] \subseteq \mathrm{Supp}(\rho)$.

- If the state evolution of $\rho$ "moves this wave package to the right", e.g., if $[t-1,t+1] \in \mathrm{Supp}(\rho(t))$ for all $t \geq 0$, then $\rho$ is not bound state with respect to position.
- If $\rho$ does not change in time, i.e., $\rho(t) = \rho$ for all $t \geq 0$, then $\rho$ is bound with respect to position.
- More generally: If the state evolution of $\rho$ "just moves $\rho$ inside a bounded domain", then $\rho$ is bound with respect to position.

== Properties ==
As finitely normalizable states must lie within the pure point part of the spectrum, bound states must lie within the pure point part. However, as Neumann and Wigner pointed out, it is possible for the energy of a bound state to be located in the continuous part of the spectrum. This phenomenon is referred to as bound state in the continuum.

=== Position-bound states ===
Consider the one-particle Schrödinger equation. If a state has energy $E < \max{\left(\lim_{x\to\infty}{V(x)}, \lim_{x\to-\infty}{V(x)}\right)}$, then the wavefunction ψ satisfies, for some $X > 0$

$$\frac{\psi^{\prime\prime}}{\psi}=\frac{2m}{\hbar^2}(V(x)-E) > 0\text{ for }x > X$$

so that ψ is exponentially suppressed at large x. This behaviour is well-studied for smoothly varying potentials in the WKB approximation for wavefunction, where an oscillatory behaviour is observed if the right hand side of the equation is negative and growing/decaying behaviour if it is positive. Hence, negative energy-states are bound if $V(x)$ vanishes at infinity.

=== Non-degeneracy in one-dimensional bound states ===
One-dimensional bound states can be shown to be non-degenerate in energy for well-behaved wavefunctions that decay to zero at infinities. This need not hold true for wavefunctions in higher dimensions. Due to the property of non-degenerate states, one-dimensional bound states can always be expressed as real wavefunctions.

Proof

Consider two energy eigenstates states $\Psi_1$ and $\Psi_2$ with same energy eigenvalue.

Then since, the Schrodinger equation, which is expressed as:
$$E  = - \frac 1 {\Psi_i(x,t)} \frac{\hbar^2}{2m}\frac{\partial^2\Psi_i(x,t) }{\partial x^2} + V(x,t)$$
is satisfied for i = 1 and 2, subtracting the two equations gives:
$$\frac 1 {\Psi_1(x,t)} \frac{\partial^2\Psi_1(x,t) }{\partial x^2} - \frac 1 {\Psi_2(x,t)} \frac{\partial^2\Psi_2(x,t) }{\partial x^2} = 0$$
which can be rearranged to give the condition:
$$\frac{\partial }{\partial x} \left(\frac{\partial \Psi_1}{\partial x}\Psi_2\right)-\frac{\partial }{\partial x} \left(\frac{\partial \Psi_2}{\partial x}\Psi_1\right)=0$$
Since $\frac{\partial \Psi_1}{\partial x}(x)\Psi_2(x)- \frac{\partial \Psi_2}{\partial x}(x)\Psi_1(x)= C$, taking limit of x going to infinity on both sides, the wavefunctions vanish and gives $C = 0$.

Solving for $\frac{\partial \Psi_1}{\partial x}(x)\Psi_2(x) = \frac{\partial \Psi_2}{\partial x}(x)\Psi_1(x)$, we get: $\Psi_1(x) = k \Psi_2(x)$ which proves that the energy eigenfunction of a 1D bound state is unique.

Furthermore it can be shown that these wavefunctions can always be represented by a completely real wavefunction. Define real functions $\rho_1(x)$ and $\rho_2(x)$ such that $\Psi(x) = \rho_1(x) + i \rho_2(x)$. Then, from Schrodinger's equation:
$$\Psi'' = - \frac{2m(E-V(x))}{\hbar^2}\Psi$$
we get that, since the terms in the equation are all real values:
$$\rho_i'' = - \frac{2m(E-V(x))}{\hbar^2}\rho_i$$
applies for i = 1 and 2. Thus every 1D bound state can be represented by completely real eigenfunctions. Note that real function representation of wavefunctions from this proof applies for all non-degenerate states in general.

=== Node theorem ===
Node theorem states that $n\text{th}$ bound wavefunction ordered according to increasing energy has exactly $n-1$ nodes, i.e., points $x=a$ where $\psi(a)=0 \neq \psi'(a)$. Due to the form of Schrödinger's time independent equations, it is not possible for a physical wavefunction to have $\psi(a) = 0 = \psi'(a)$ since it corresponds to $\psi(x)=0$ solution.

== Requirements ==
A boson with mass m_{χ} mediating a weakly coupled interaction produces an Yukawa-like interaction potential,

$V(r) = \pm\frac{\alpha_\chi}{r} e^{- \frac{r}{\lambda\!\!\!\frac{}{\ }_\chi}}$,

where $\alpha_\chi=g^2/4\pi$, g is the gauge coupling constant, and ƛ_{i} = ℏ/m_{i}c is the reduced Compton wavelength. A scalar boson produces a universally attractive potential, whereas a vector attracts particles to antiparticles but repels like pairs. For two particles of mass m_{1} and m_{2}, the Bohr radius of the system becomes

$a_0=\frac{{\lambda\!\!\!^{{}^\underline{\ \ }}}_1 + {\lambda\!\!\!^{{}^\underline{\ \ }}}_2}{\alpha_\chi}$

and yields the dimensionless number

$$D=\frac{{\lambda\!\!\!^{{}^\underline{\ \ }}}_\chi}{a_0} = \alpha_\chi\frac{{\lambda\!\!\!^{{}^\underline{\ \ }}}_\chi}{{\lambda\!\!\!^{{}^\underline{\ \ }}}_1 + {\lambda\!\!\!^{{}^\underline{\ \ }}}_2} = \alpha_\chi\frac{m_1+m_2}{m_\chi}$$.

In order for the first bound state to exist at all, $D\gtrsim 0.8$. Because the photon is massless, D is infinite for electromagnetism. For the weak interaction, the Z boson's mass is 91.1876±0.0021 GeV/c^{2}, which prevents the formation of bound states between most particles, as it is 97.2 times the proton's mass and 178,000 times the electron's mass.

Note, however, that, if the Higgs interaction did not break electroweak symmetry at the electroweak scale, then the SU(2) weak interaction would become confining.

== See also ==
- Bethe–Salpeter equation
- Bound state in the continuum
- Composite field
- Cooper pair
- Exciton
- Resonance (particle physics)
- Levinson's theorem
