= Bic (disambiguation) =

Bic is a French manufacturer of stationery, lighters, and shaving razors.

BIC or Bic may also refer to:

== Businesses, organisations, and products ==
- Bic Cristal, disposable ballpoint pen
- Bic lighter, disposable lighter
- Bic Camera, Japanese electronics retailer
- Baháʼí International Community, an international non-governmental organization
- Barrier Industrial Council, the trades and labour council in Broken Hill, New South Wales, Australia
- Bureau of International Containers (Bureau International des Containers), a Paris-based registrar for intermodal shipping containers

== People ==
- Bic Hayes (Christian Hayes, born 1964), English musician
- Bic Runga (Briolette Kah Bic Runga, born 1976), New Zealand musician
- Blue Ivy Carter (born 2012), stage name B.I.C., an American singer, daughter of Beyoncé and Jay-Z

== Places ==
- Bîc, a river in Moldova
- Bić, a mountain in Serbia
- Le Bic, Quebec, Canada
  - Bic National Park, near Le Bic
- Bîc, Bubuieci, Moldova
- Bic, Șimleu Silvaniei, Romania

== Science and technology ==
- Bayesian information criterion, a statistical measure for choosing between models
- Bit clear, a bitwise Boolean operation A & ¬B also called and not
- Bound state in the continuum, an eigenstate of quantum systems
- Bureau International des Containers, overseeing standards for shipping containers
- Burroughs Interchange Code, a derivative of BCD character encoding

== Sports ==
- Bic (cycling team), active from 1967 to 1974
- Bahrain International Circuit, a motorsport venue
- Buddh International Circuit, an Indian motor-racing circuit

== Other uses ==
- Bien de Interés Cultural, a category of the Spanish heritage register
- Bournemouth International Centre, in England
- Business Identifier Code, a standardized unique identifier for organizations, commonly financial ones

== See also ==
- Bik (disambiguation)
- Bick (disambiguation)
