= Qulanlu-ye Olya =

Village in North Khorasan province, Iran

Qulanlu-ye Olya Persian: قولانلوعليا
- Village
- Location within Iran
- Coordinates: 37°36′47″N 57°48′54″E
- Country: Iran
- Province: North Khorasan
- County: Shirvan
- District: Sarhad
- Rural District: Takmaran

Population (2016)
  - Total: 306
- Time zone: UTC+3:30 (IRST)

Qulanlu-ye Olya (Persian: قولانلوعليا) (Note: Also romanized as Qūlānlū-ye ‘Olyā; also known as Qūlānlū-ye Bālā) is a village in Takmaran Rural District of Sarhad District in Shirvan County, North Khorasan province, Iran.

== Demographics ==
=== Population ===
At the time of the 2006 National Census, the village's population was 267 in 61 households. The following census in 2011 counted 283 people in 72 households. The 2016 census measured the population of the village as 306 people in 98 households.
