= Sweatshirt =

Shirt made from thick cloth material

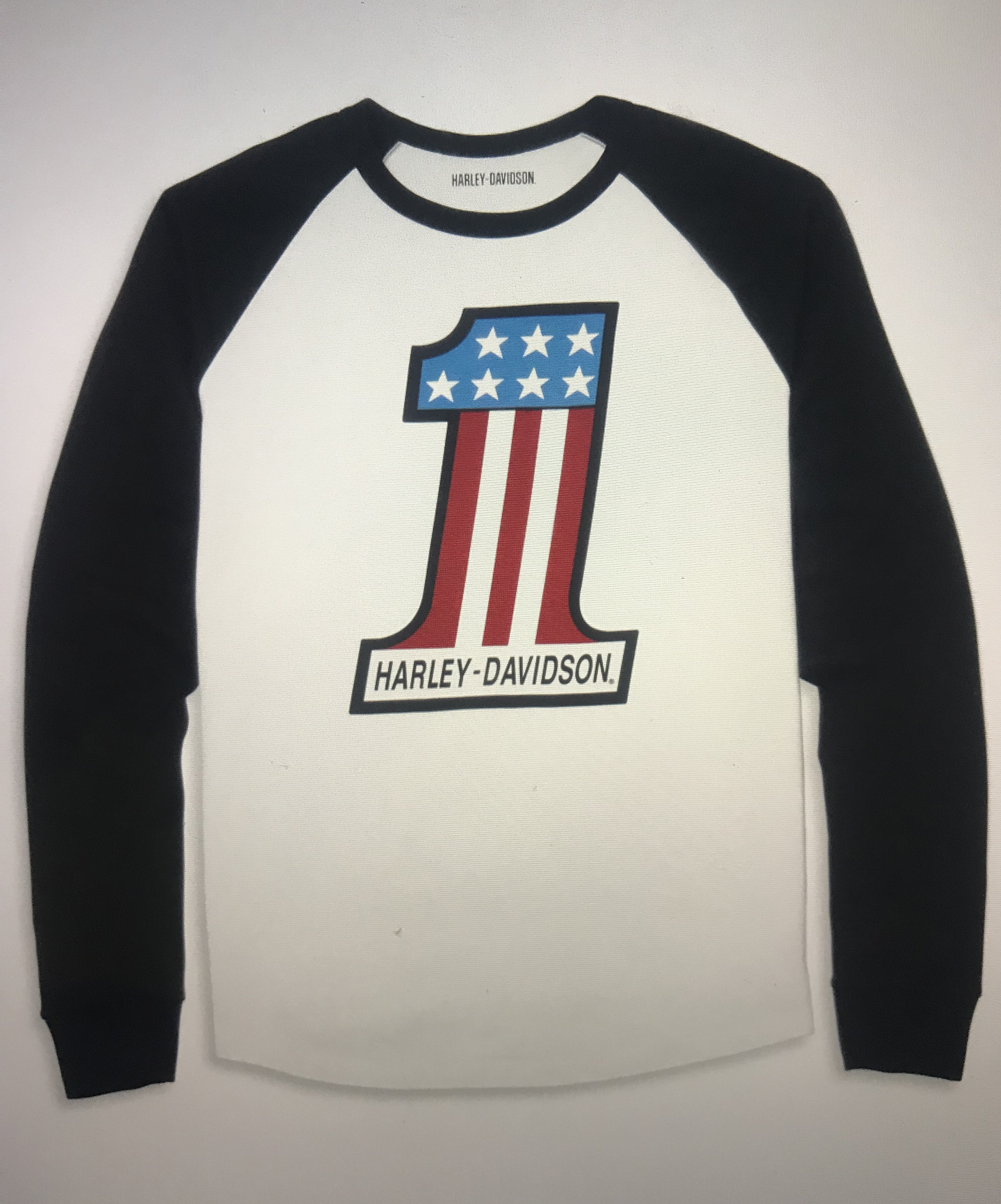
A raglan sleeve sweatshirt with Harley-Davidson branding

A sweatshirt is a long-sleeved pullover shirt or jacket fashioned out of thick, usually cotton, cloth material. Sweatshirts are almost exclusively casual attire and hence not as formal as some sweaters. Sweatshirts may or may not have a hood. A sweatshirt with a hood is now usually referred to as a hoodie, although more formal media may still use the term "hooded sweatshirt".

== History ==
In 1920, Benjamin Russell Jr., a quarterback for the Alabama Crimson Tide Football team, was tired of the constant chafing and itching caused by their wool football uniforms. He worked with his father, whose company Russell Manufacturing Company made women's and children's knit garments, to come up with a better option. They created a thick cotton practice jersey that was a modification of a ladies' union suit top. These loose, collarless pullovers were the first sweatshirts. A new division of the company, focusing solely on the production of sweatshirts, became the Russell Athletic Company.

In Australia, the sweatshirt is sometimes referred to as a 'Sloppy Joe'.
