= Bik =

Bik or BIK may refer to:

- .bik, the file extension for the Bink Video file format
- Bcl-2-interacting killer, a human gene
- Benefit in kind, the value of something for tax purposes
- Baig, a noble title
- Bikol languages of the central Philippines (ISO 639-2 and 639-3 codes)

== Places ==
- Bik, Iran, a village in North Khorasan Province, Iran
- Frans Kaisiepo Airport, Biak, Indonesia (IATA code)
- Birkbeck station, London (National Rail code)

== People ==
- Elisabeth Bik (born 1966), Dutch microbiologist and consultant on scientific integrity
- Leung Bik (1843–1911), Hong Kong martial artist
- Brendan McFarlane (born 1951), Irish Republican activist, nicknamed Bik

== See also ==
- Bike (disambiguation)
- Bic (disambiguation)
