= Tukur =

Village in North Khorasan province, Iran

Tukur Persian: توكور
- Village
- Location within Iran
- Coordinates: 37°37′57″N 57°46′53″E
- Country: Iran
- Province: North Khorasan
- County: Shirvan
- District: Sarhad
- Rural District: Takmaran

Population (2016)
  - Total: 489
- Time zone: UTC+3:30 (IRST)

Tukur (Persian: توكور) (Note: Also romanized as Tūkūr; also known as Beyk Tūkūr-e Pā’īn, Bīk-e Tūkūr, and Tūgūr) is a village in, and the capital of, Takmaran Rural District in Sarhad District of Shirvan County, North Khorasan province, Iran.

== Demographics ==
=== Population ===
At the time of the 2006 National Census, the village's population was 470 in 119 households. The following census in 2011 counted 576 people in 128 households. The 2016 census measured the population of the village as 489 people in 147 households.
