= Tupkanlu =

Village in North Khorasan province, Iran

Tupkanlu Persian: توپكانلو
- Village
- Location within Iran
- Coordinates: 37°33′59″N 57°41′49″E
- Country: Iran
- Province: North Khorasan
- County: Shirvan
- District: Sarhad
- Rural District: Takmaran

Population (2016)
  - Total: 721
- Time zone: UTC+3:30 (IRST)

Tupkanlu (Persian: توپكانلو) (Note: Also romanized as Tūpkānlū) is a village in Takmaran Rural District of Sarhad District in Shirvan County, North Khorasan province, Iran.

== Demographics ==
=== Population ===
At the time of the 2006 National Census, the village's population was 599 in 130 households. The following census in 2011 counted 443 people in 110 households. The 2016 census measured the population of the village as 721 people in 183 households, the most populous in its rural district.
