= Moore-Bick =

Moore-Bick is a surname. Notable people with the surname include:

- John Moore-Bick (born 1949), British Army officer
- Martin Moore-Bick (born 1946), British judge

== See also ==
- Moore (surname)
- Bick (disambiguation)
