= Jockstrap =

Undergarment originally designed for supporting the male genitalia

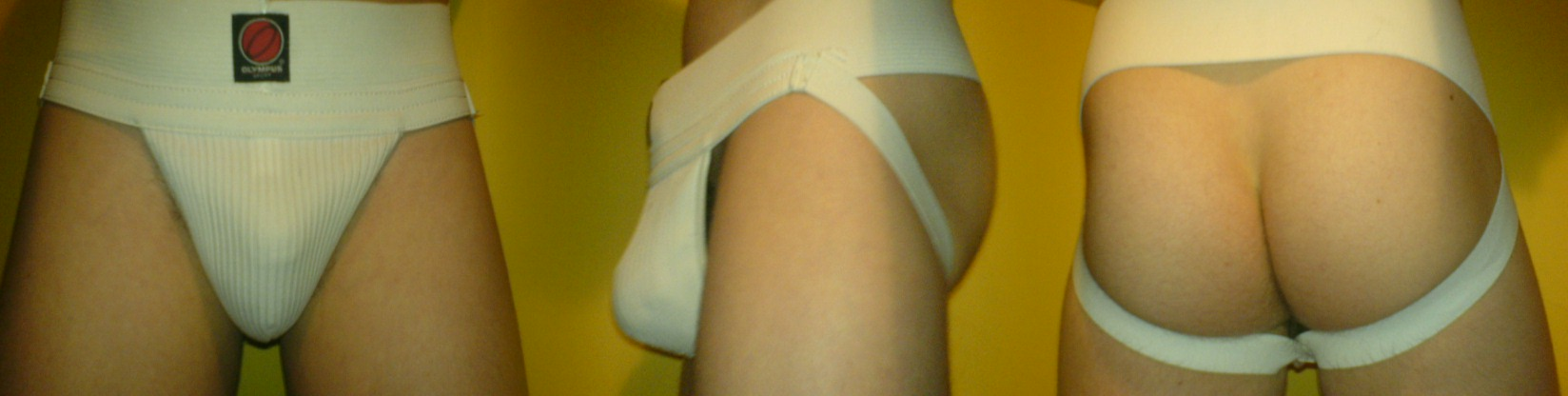
Frontal, side and rear views of a man wearing a jockstrap

A jockstrap, (Note: Also known as a jock (male), jill (female), strap, cup, groin guard, pelvic protector (female), supporter, or athletic supporter.) colloquially called a jock, is an undergarment for protecting the scrotum and penis during contact sports, exercising, or other vigorous physical activity.

A jockstrap consists of a waistband (usually elastic) with a support pouch for the genitalia and two elastic straps affixed to the base of the pouch and to the left and right sides of the waistband at the hip. The pouch, in some varieties, may be fitted with a pocket to hold an abdominal guard (impact resistant cup, box) to protect the testicles and the penis from injury.

The jillstrap (a.k.a. a "jill") is the female equivalent of the jockstrap, designed to protect the vulva from getting struck.

== Etymology ==
The word jockstrap has purportedly been in use at least since 1891, a likely contraction of "jockey strap", as the garment was first designed for bicycle-riding messengers and deliverymen, or 'bike jockeys'. The Bike Jockey Strap was the first jockstrap manufactured in America in 1874.

Jockey meaning 'rider', primarily a race horse rider, has been in use since 1670. Jockey itself is the diminutive form of the Scots nickname Jock (for John) as Jackie is for the English nickname Jack. The nicknames Jack and Jackie, Jock and Jockey have been used generically for 'man, fellow, boy, common man'. From the period c.1650–c.1850, 'jock' was used as slang for penis.

The more recent American slang term "jock", meaning an athlete, is traced to the period of 1953 to 1963, and is itself derived from "jockstrap" and "jockey".

== History ==
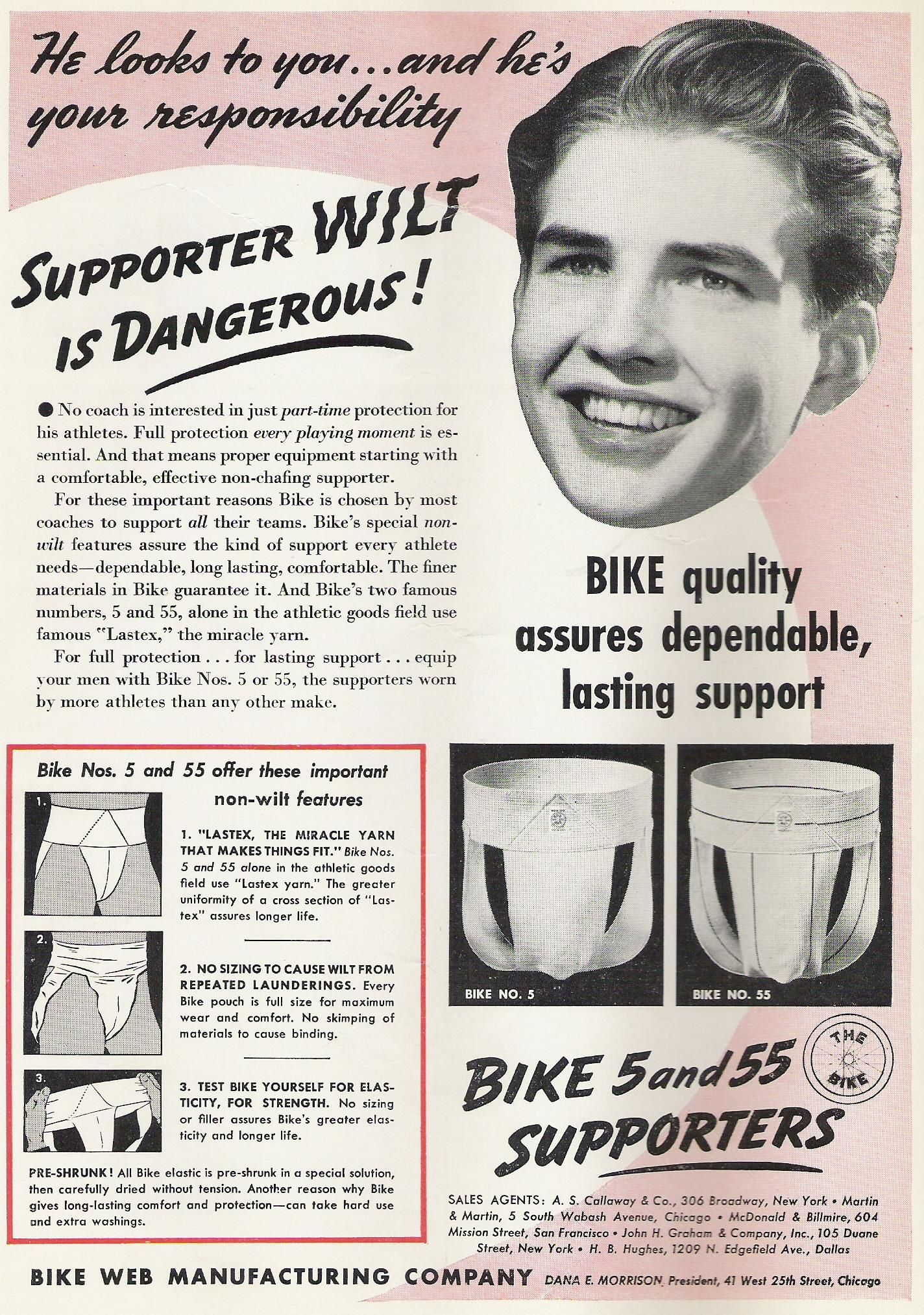
Jockstrap ad, 1941

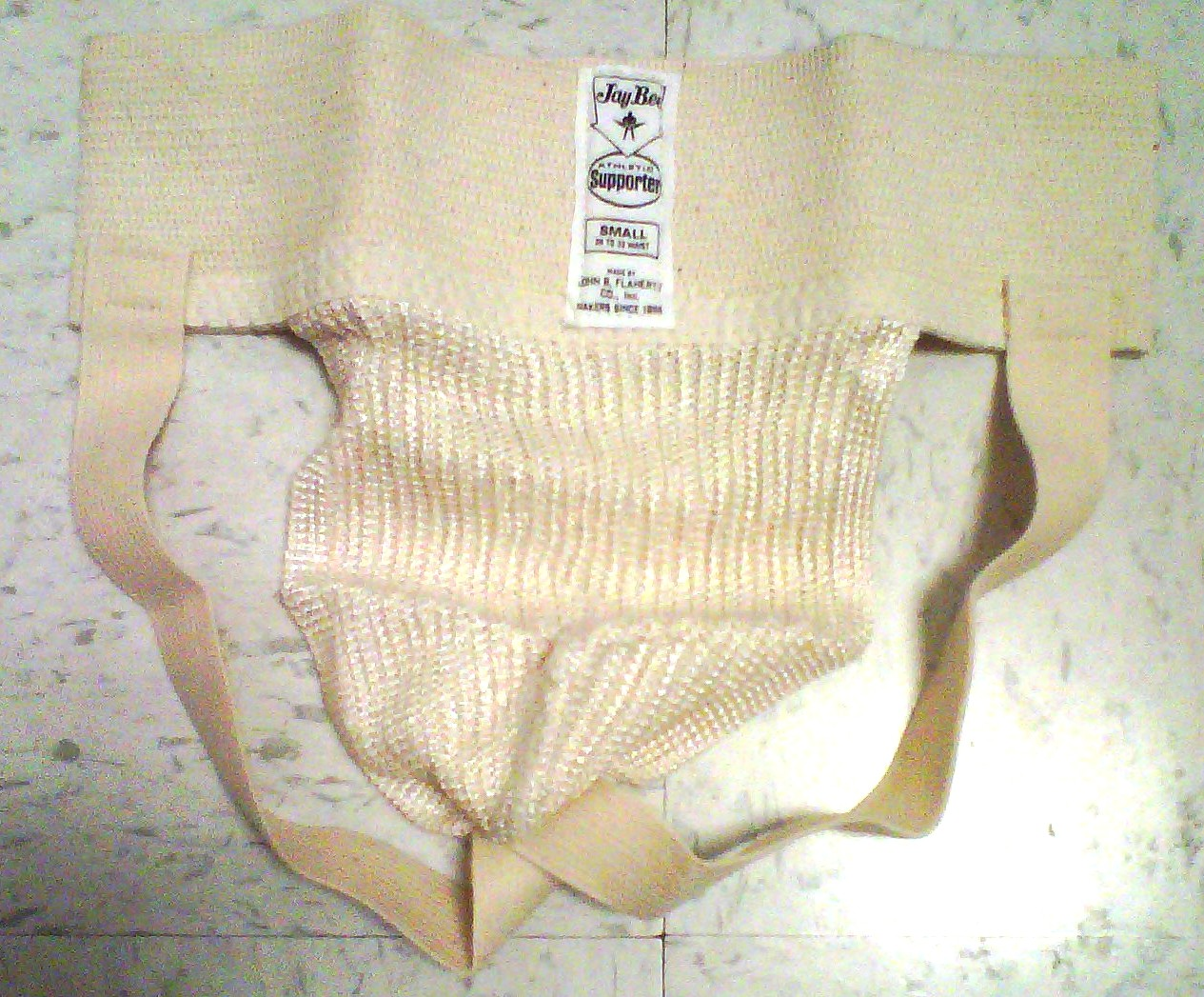
JayBee jockstrap

The jockstrap was invented in 1874 by C. F. Bennett of a Chicago sporting goods company, Sharp & Smith, to provide comfort and support for bicycle jockeys working the cobblestone streets of Boston. The original incarnation of the jockstrap resembled a thong, as it featured a strap that went between the buttocks. In 1897 Bennett's newly formed Bike Web Company patented and began mass-producing the Bike Jockey Strap. The Bike Web Company later became known as the Bike Company. Bike, until 2003, was a stand-alone company. In that year, the company and its trademarks were purchased by Russell Athletic. Russell Athletic continued to produce jockstraps using the Bike brand and logos until 2017 when they retired the brand. Russell had become a Fruit-of-the-Loom subsidiary, and Fruit-of-the-Loom is owned by and part of Berkshire Hathaway. On April 15, 2021, the brand's website reopened for online sales, featuring a modernized version of their trademark "No. 10" jockstrap, as well as active apparel.

The jockstrap was also influential in early 20th-century medicine with the invention of the Heidelberg Electric Belt, a low-voltage electric powered jockstrap that claimed to cure kidney disorders, insomnia, erectile dysfunction, and other ailments. Today, jockstraps are still worn in the US by adolescent and adult men for sports, weightlifting, medical purposes, and for recovery from injury or surgery for such conditions as hematocele, inguinal hernia, hydrocele, or spermatocele.

In the early 2020s, jockstraps saw a renewed popularity as underwear for men with jockstraps finding favor in place of more conventional underwear as wearing them became a fashionable trend. The trend was reflected with the inclusion of the garment in the runways of various major designers including, Calvin Klein, JW Anderson, Gucci, and Rick Owens, alongside other large brands like Adidas, Diesel, and 2(x)ist making multiple styles.

== Design ==
Jockstraps are fairly consistent in design with variations appearing in details like width of waistband and fabrics. Some jockstraps are designed for specific sports: Swim jocks, for example, have a narrow waistband, and hockey jocks sometimes have adjustable elastic straps and garter clips that hold hockey socks in place while the bulky goalie protector has genital and abdominal foam padding. Windproof jockstraps have a special layer of fabric to protect the wearer from wind and cold in winter sports. Jockstraps are made in other materials as fetish wear. Aside from the aforementioned "fashion jockstraps", the 2000s have seen a resurgence in jockstrap designs and brands.

Alternatives to jockstraps include the jock brief, or support briefs, which have the wide waistband of a jockstrap combined with a full seat and are made of an elastic supportive material. A thong style strap, sometimes called a dance belt, has one narrow elastic strap attached to the bottom of the pouch, passing between the legs and attaching to the waistband at the middle of the back. A strapless garment, called a jock sock or sometimes a slingshot, has only an elastic waist band with an elastic pouch that holds the genitals from the front.

In Europe, from the time of the Middle Ages, undergarments available were limited to a loose fitting trouser-like piece of clothing called a braies. This article of clothing was stepped into and then laced or tied around the waist and legs at about mid-calf and provided no support to the male genitals. This allowed the scrotum unlimited movement under clothing and resulted in injury from carts, carriages with wooden planks for seats or the saddle as the body took all of the force of the motion. The suspensory was developed around the early 1820s as a way to lift the scrotum away from the plank seat and saddle thereby preventing injury while in a cart, carriage or horseback riding. Today the suspensory is used primarily as a medical device after genital surgery to aid in post operative healing. General Custer's suspensory can be seen in the Little Bighorn Battlefield National Monument museum, near Crow Agency Montana.

== Protective cup ==
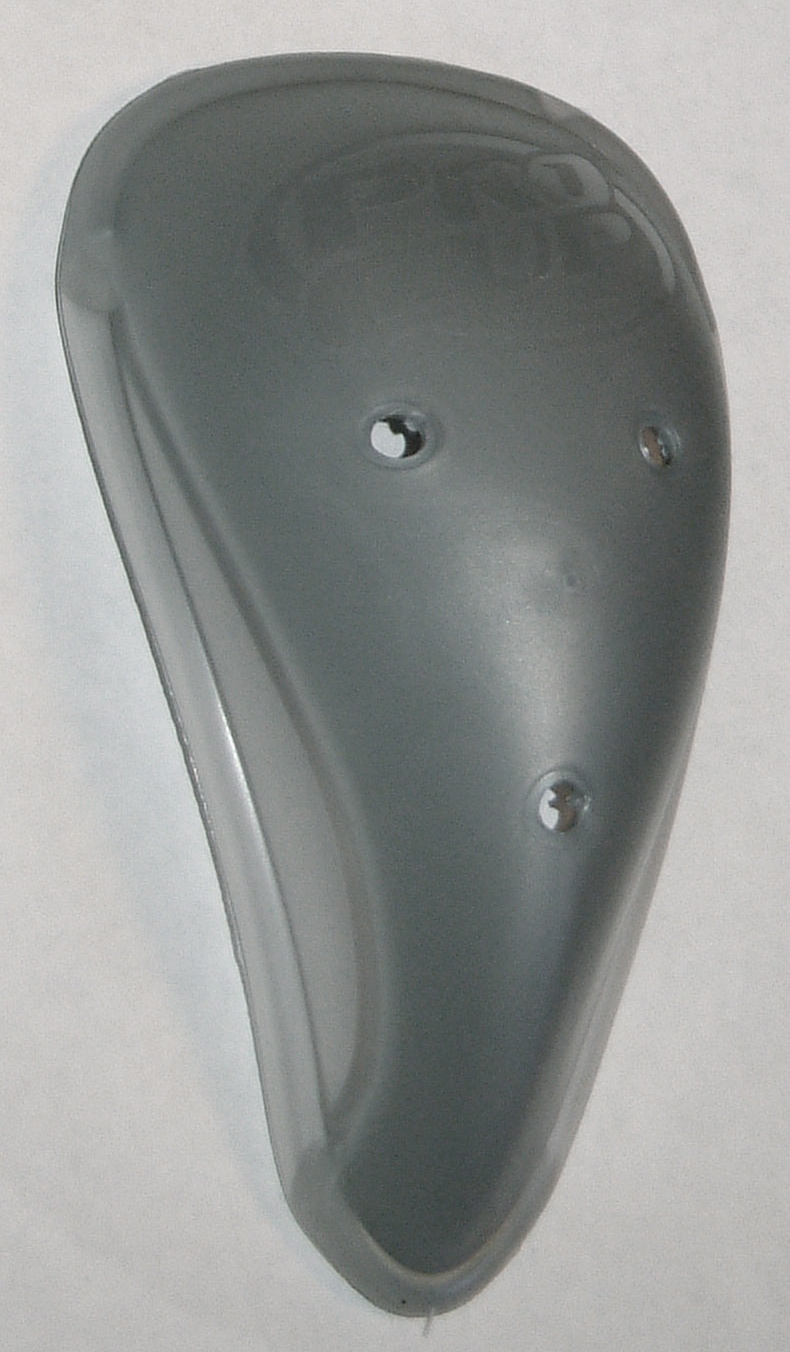
Banana-style cup, down position

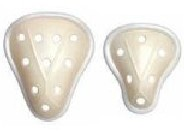
Traditional cup, up position

Optional cups offer additional protection for contact sports and are made of hard plastic or steel, perforated for ventilation. A more flexible and comfortable soft cup is also offered for low contact sports such as soccer. A flex cup variation features a hard exterior melded with a soft lining.

A similar piece of protective equipment in the sport of cricket is known as a box. In cricket, a box is usually worn by only a batsman, a wicket-keeper, and sometimes other close-up fielders. For fielders farther from the batsman (where such protection is generally unnecessary), the wearing of a box would impede their movement and running (for batsmen the benefits outweigh the disadvantages).

An abdominal guard (also called "compression cup", "box", or "L Guard") is a hard usually plastic cup that is inserted in a jockstrap to protect male genitalia. Some jockstraps have a lined front pouch for this purpose. The abdominal guard is usually constructed from high density plastic with a padded edge, shaped like a hollow half-pear, and inserted into the jockstrap or jockstrap-style underwear of the batsmen and wicket-keeper. This is used to protect the genitals against impact from the ball.

Many sports require the use of an athletic cup. These include cricket, fencing, martial arts, boxing, lacrosse, hockey, baseball, paintball, football and many others.

Fashion jocks often incorporate soft-lined front pouches or they may be designed to bring the male genitalia forward or upward. The purpose of these modifications is to enhance the masculine appearance of the wearer. Wearers of fashion jocks may also wear abdominal guards for the same purpose.

With the decline in the use of jockstraps in sports, the use of the necessary abdominal guard has also declined despite the safety implications. Typically cups are worn in the pouch of a jockstrap which may be double-lined to hold the cup, or in compression shorts or sport-specific briefs.

Cups for some combat sports (e.g. mixed martial arts, kick boxing) have a waistband and straps attached directly to the cup designed to be worn over a regular jockstrap or briefs. Some sports such as boxing use an oversized cup and jock combined into a single item which has layered foam padding that protects the groin, kidneys and abdomen.

== Jockstraps for women ==
The pelvic protector is the female equivalent of the male jockstrap. It is currently unclear who was responsible for the first invention of the female pelvic protector. It is designed to protect the female genitalia from bruising or tearing. The area protected includes the entire vulva, including the clitoris, the clitoral hood and the delicate labia minora which protrude from the vulva in some women and are therefore especially vulnerable to bruising from impact. It is also occasionally nicknamed a "jill" or "jillstrap". Women wear the garment during contact sports or activities. The garment cups around the genitals and is usually reinforced with rigid material.

== Gay subculture ==
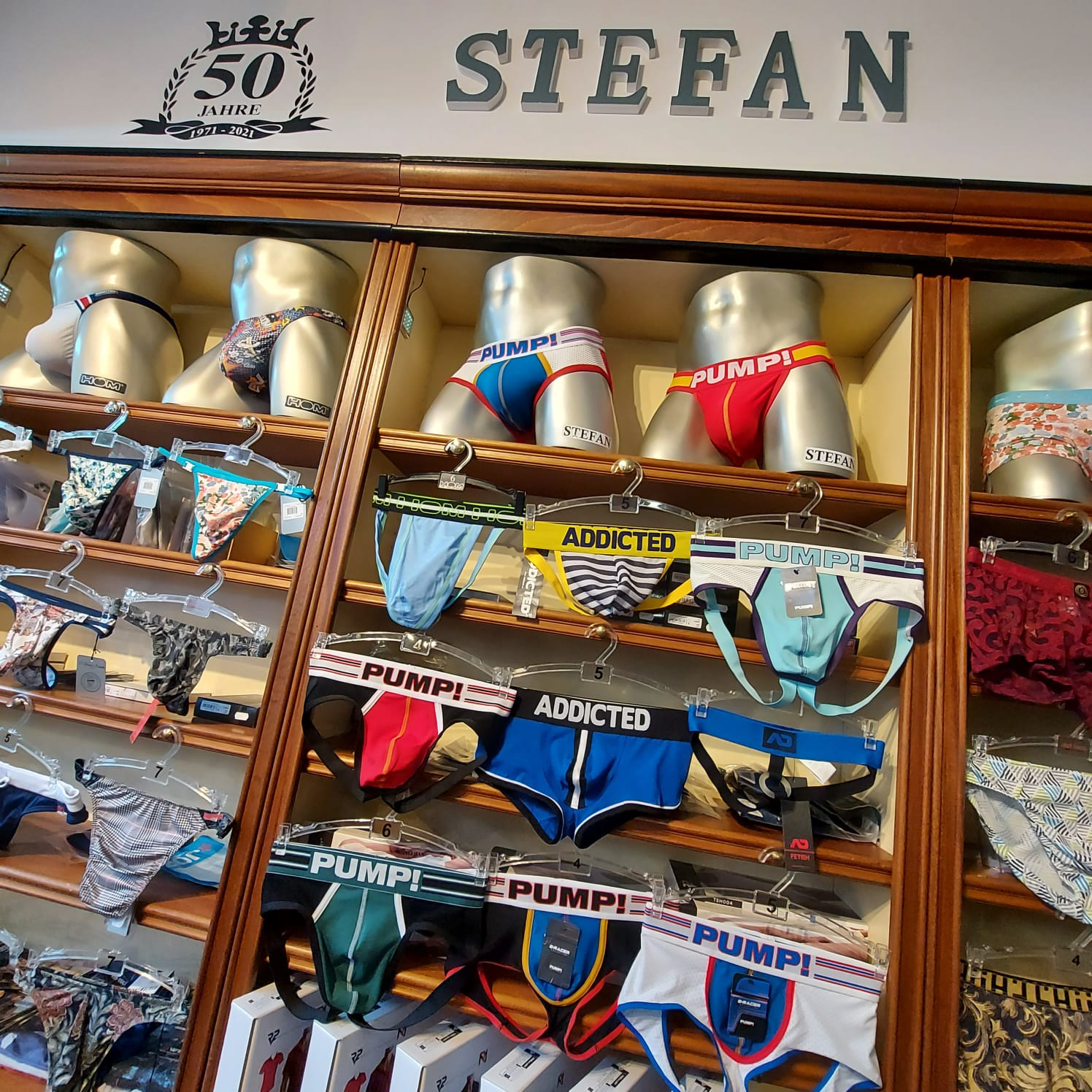
Selection of different jockstraps as fashionable men's underwear without jockstrap protection in a German boutique in the red-light district of Hanover

The jockstrap, which originated as utilitarian sports equipment, was appropriated by gay men starting in the 1950s, especially among fetish subcultures.

== Gallery ==
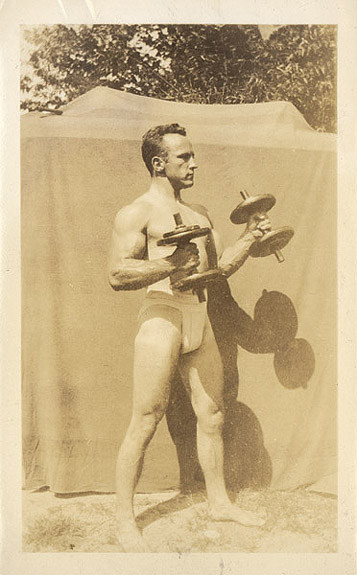
Vintage photograph of a bodybuilder

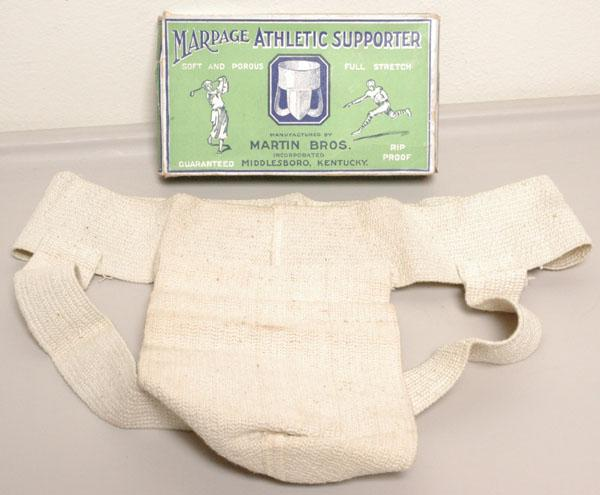
Marpage jockstrap and packaging, c. 1930

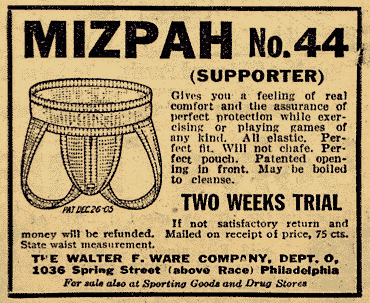
This Mizpah supporter ad, from a 1922 magazine, appeared in the A&E documentary Unmentionables

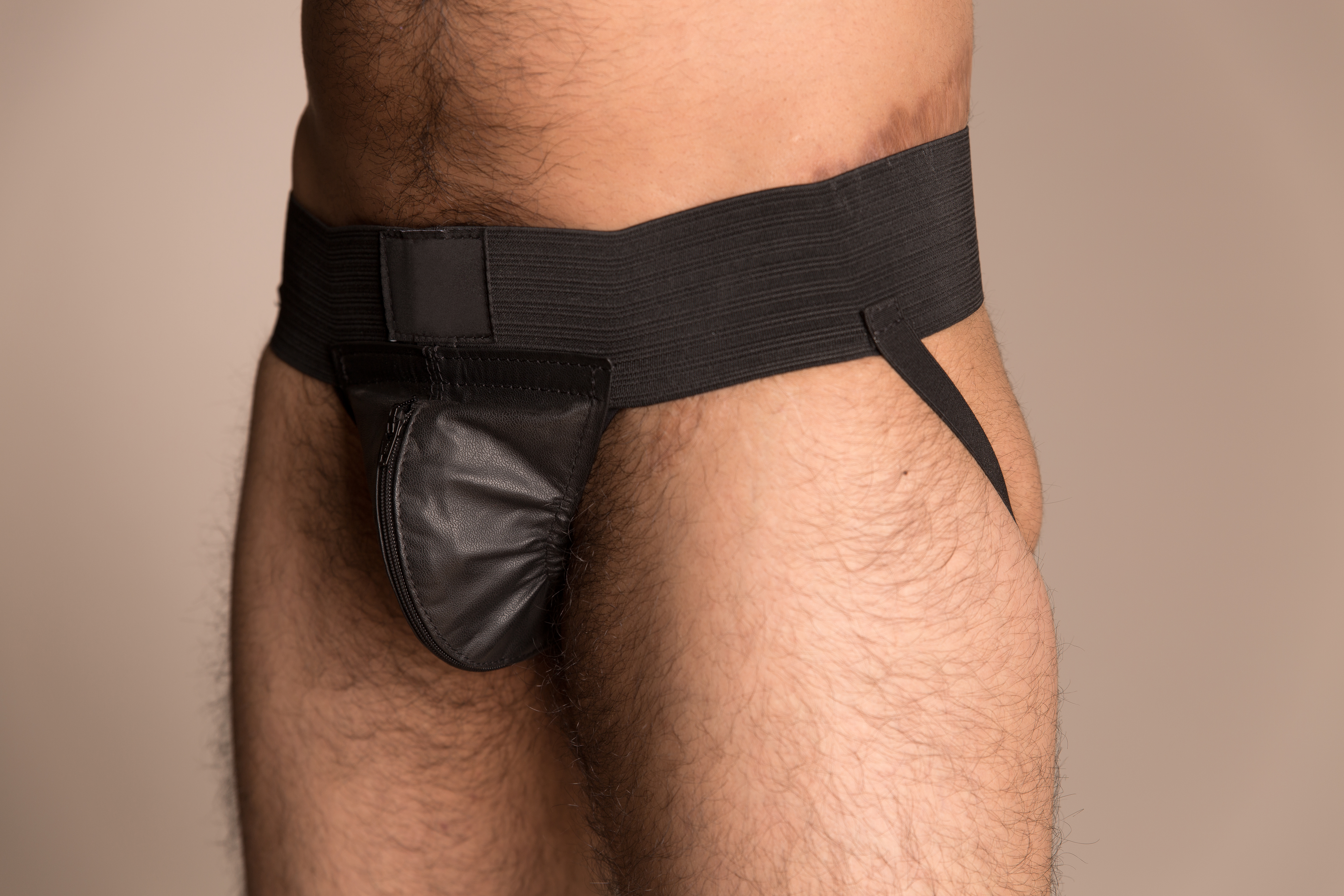
A black jockstrap

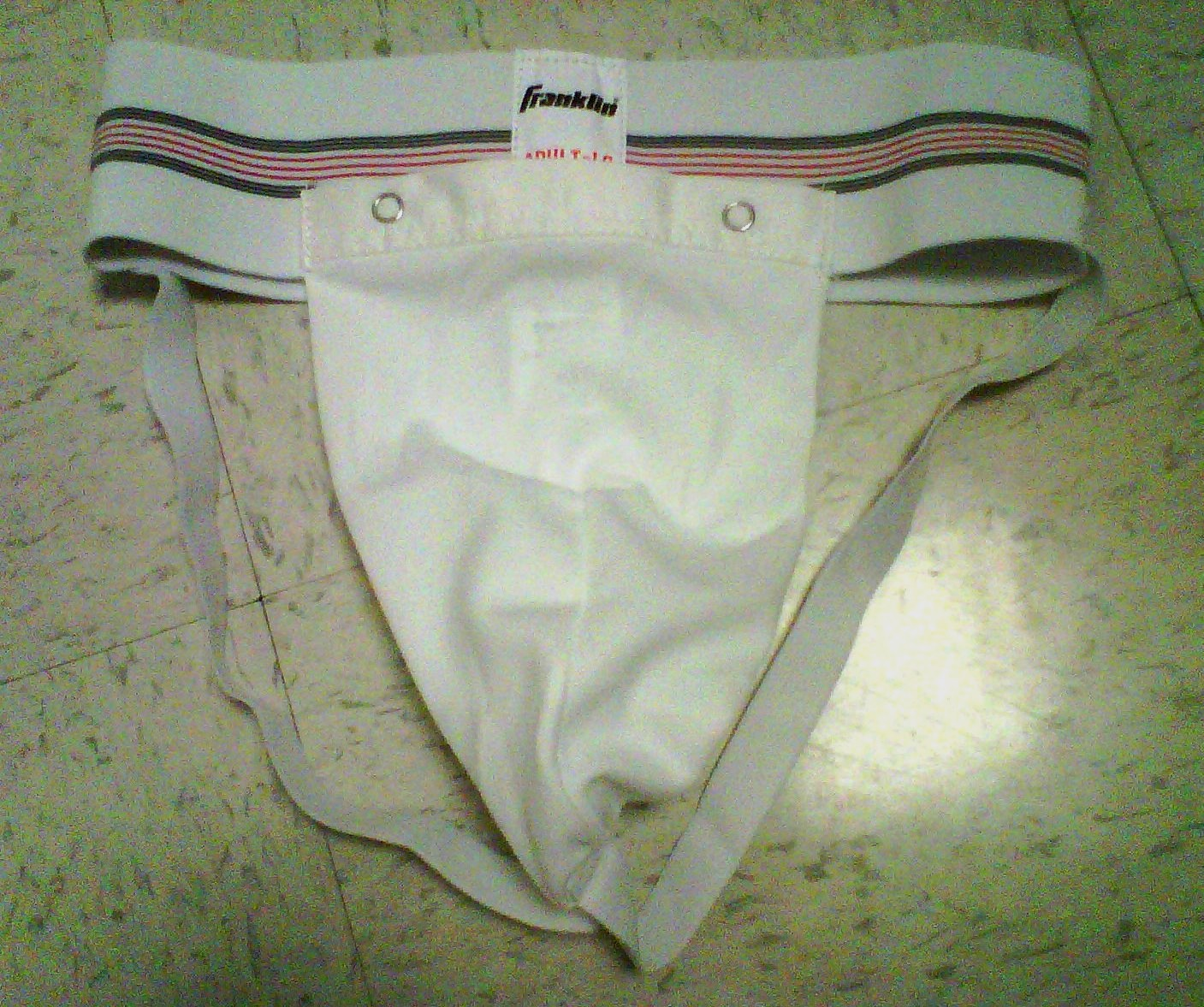
Franklin cup supporter

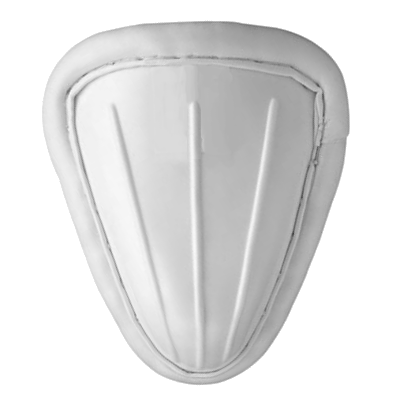
A form of a cup, as worn by male cricket players.

Black CK Jockstrap

== See also ==
- Baseball clothing and equipment
- BIKE Athletic Company
- Cricket clothing and equipment
- Russell Crowe's jockstrap
- Tinea cruris, more commonly known as "jock itch"
