= Beyk =

Village in North Khorasan province, Iran

Beyk Persian: بيك
- Village
- Location within Iran
- Coordinates: 37°36′08″N 57°53′44″E
- Country: Iran
- Province: North Khorasan
- County: Shirvan
- District: Sarhad
- Rural District: Takmaran

Population (2016)
  - Total: 674
- Time zone: UTC+3:30 (IRST)

Beyk (Persian: بیک) (Note: Also romanized as Bīk; also known as Beyg) is a village in Takmaran Rural District of Sarhad District in Shirvan County, North Khorasan province, Iran.

== Demographics ==
=== Population ===
At the time of the 2006 National Census, the village's population was 632 in 153 households. The following census in 2011 counted 686 people in 197 households. The 2016 census measured the population of the village as 674 people in 192 households.
