= Gugeli =

Village in North Khorasan province, Iran

Gugeli Persian: گوگلي
- Village
- Location within Iran
- Coordinates: 37°37′27″N 57°54′02″E
- Country: Iran
- Province: North Khorasan
- County: Shirvan
- District: Sarhad
- Rural District: Takmaran

Population (2016)
  - Total: 332
- Time zone: UTC+3:30 (IRST)

Gugeli (Persian: گوگلي) (Note: Also romanized as Gowglī, Gūgelī, and Gūglī; also known as Gugi, Kowkelī (كوكلي), and Kūkelī) is a village in Takmaran Rural District of Sarhad District in Shirvan County, North Khorasan province, Iran.

== Demographics ==
=== Population ===
At the time of the 2006 National Census, the village's population was 306 in 75 households. The following census in 2011 counted 295 people in 80 households. The 2016 census measured the population of the village as 332 people in 102 households.
