= Donald Bick =

English cricketer

Personal information
- Full name: Donald Albert Bick
- Born: 22 February 1936; Hampstead, London, England
- Died: 24 January 1992 (aged 55); Ware, Hertfordshire, England
- Batting: Right-handed
- Bowling: Right-arm off break

Domestic team information
- Years: Team
- 1968–1974: Hertfordshire
- 1967: Marylebone Cricket Club
- 1954–1967: Middlesex

Career statistics
Competition	First-class	List A
Matches	147	1
Runs scored	2,221	3
Batting average	13.96	3.00
100s/50s	–/9	–/–
Top score	85	3
Balls bowled	15,529	24
Wickets	234	–
Bowling average	27.70	–
5 wickets in innings	5	–
10 wickets in match	–	–
Best bowling	5/22	–
Catches/stumpings	36/–	–/–
- Source: Cricinfo, 7 December 2011

Donald Albert Bick (22 February 1936 – 24 January 1992) was an English cricketer. He played for Middlesex from 1954 to 1967 as a right-handed lower-order batsman who bowled right-arm off-spin. He was born at Hampstead, London.

His highest first-class score was 85, for L.C. Stevens' XI against Cambridge University in 1960. He twice took his best bowling figures of 5 for 22: for Middlesex against Yorkshire in 1959 and for Middlesex against Cambridge University in 1965.

He played Minor Counties cricket for Hertfordshire from 1968 to 1974.
