= Bike Magazine =

Bike Magazine may refer to:

- BIKE Magazine, a British cycling magazine
- Bike (magazine) a UK motorcycling magazine

== See also ==
- Classic Bike
- Performance Bikes (magazine)
- SuperBike (magazine)
