= San Antonio B-Cycle =

Bike sharing system in San Antonio, Texas, United States

San Antonio BCycle

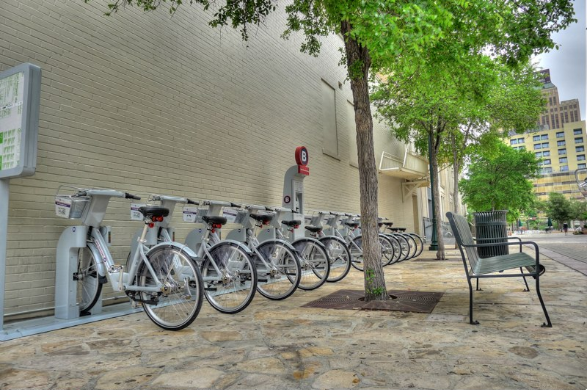
- The Main Plaza BCycle station

Overview
- Locale: San Antonio, Texas
- Transit type: Bicycle-sharing system
- Number of stations: 56
- Website: sanantonio.bcycle.com

Operation
- Began operation: 26 March 2011; 13 years ago
- Operator(s): BCycle
- Number of vehicles: 600

San Antonio BCycle is a privately owned for-profit public bicycle-sharing system that serves San Antonio, Texas. In operation since March 26, 2011, it is the largest bike sharing program in Texas and the second largest bike sharing program in the BCycle program.

As of June 2013, the San Antonio BCycle system consisted of 42 stations and over 400 bikes. By the end of 2013, 11 more stations will be added which will increase the bike count to 450.

In 2014, BCycle will expand to 68 stations and 600 bikes.

== History ==
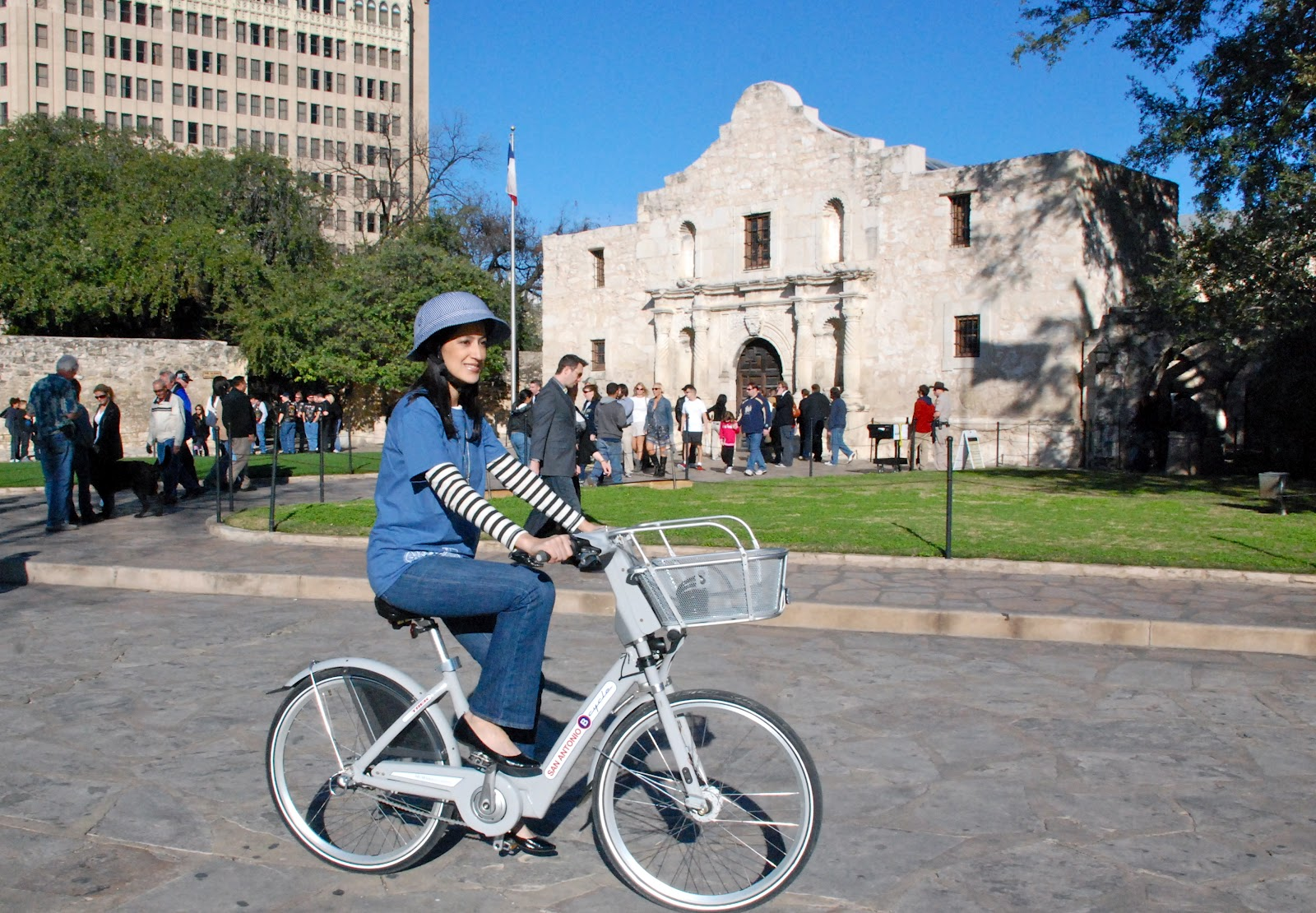
Customer riding the bike in front of the Alamo Mission fort in downtown San Antonio.

San Antonio BCycle was the first bike share program to be launched in Texas. The first phase of San Antonio BCycle was launched on March 26, 2011. In the first six months of operation, San Antonio BCyclers took over 16,000 trips and generated 857 annual passes and 2,795 day passes.

== See also ==
- BCycle
- List of bicycle-sharing systems
