= Biker =

Biker or bikie may refer to:

- A cyclist, a bicycle rider or participant in cycling sports
- A motorcyclist, any motorcycle rider or passenger, or participant in motorcycle sports
  - A motorcycle club member, defined more narrowly than all motorcyclists
    - An outlaw motorcycle club member, more narrowly than all motorcycle club members

== See also ==
- Biker subculture (disambiguation)
- Byker, a district of Newcastle, England
