= BIKE Athletic Company =

American sportswear company

Bike Athletic Company
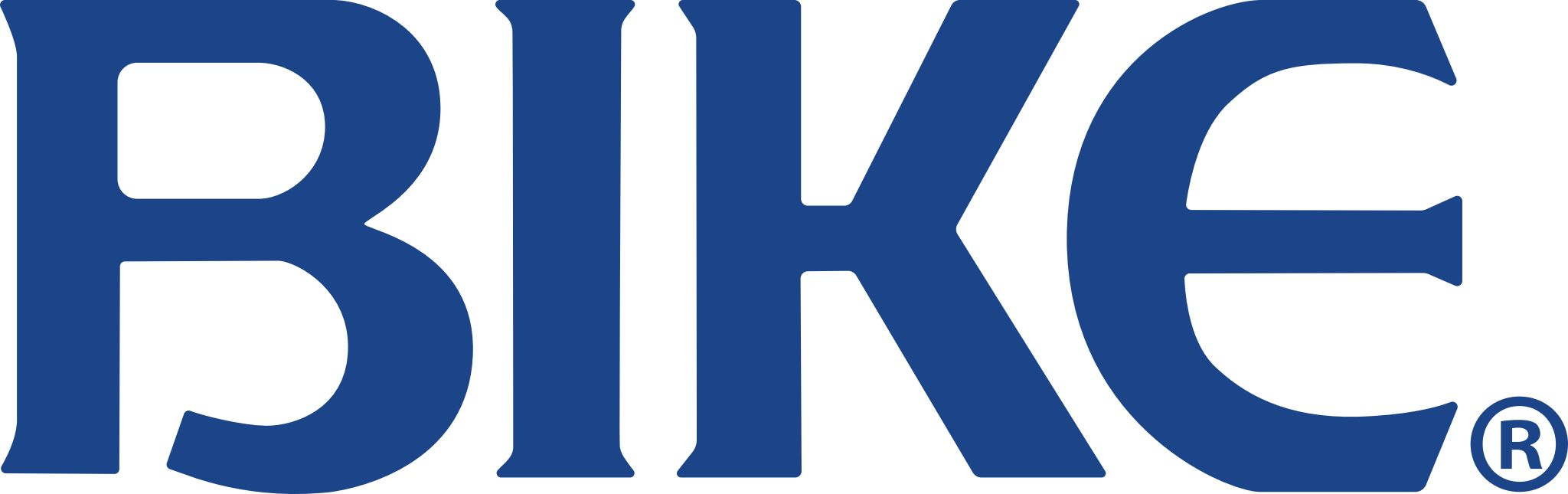
- Company type: Subsidiary
- Industry: Men's underwear, and activewear
- Founded: 1874; 152 years ago
- Area served: United States
- Products: Men's apparel
- Parent: New Times Group

Bike Athletic Company is an American sportswear company.

In 1874, Charles F. Bennett, an employee of the Chicago sporting goods company Sharp and Smith, invented the jockstrap, designed to provide support and protection for bicycle transporters navigating Boston's cobbled streets. Bennett later founded the Bike Web Company and played a major role in popularizing the jockstrap among athletes and workers.

On November 30, 1897, Bennett patented an improved version of the undergarment under U.S. Patent No. 594,673, titled "Combined Jock-Strap and Suspensory". Over time, the jockstrap became widely adopted in various organized sports, leading to the colloquial term "jock" for athletes who wore them.

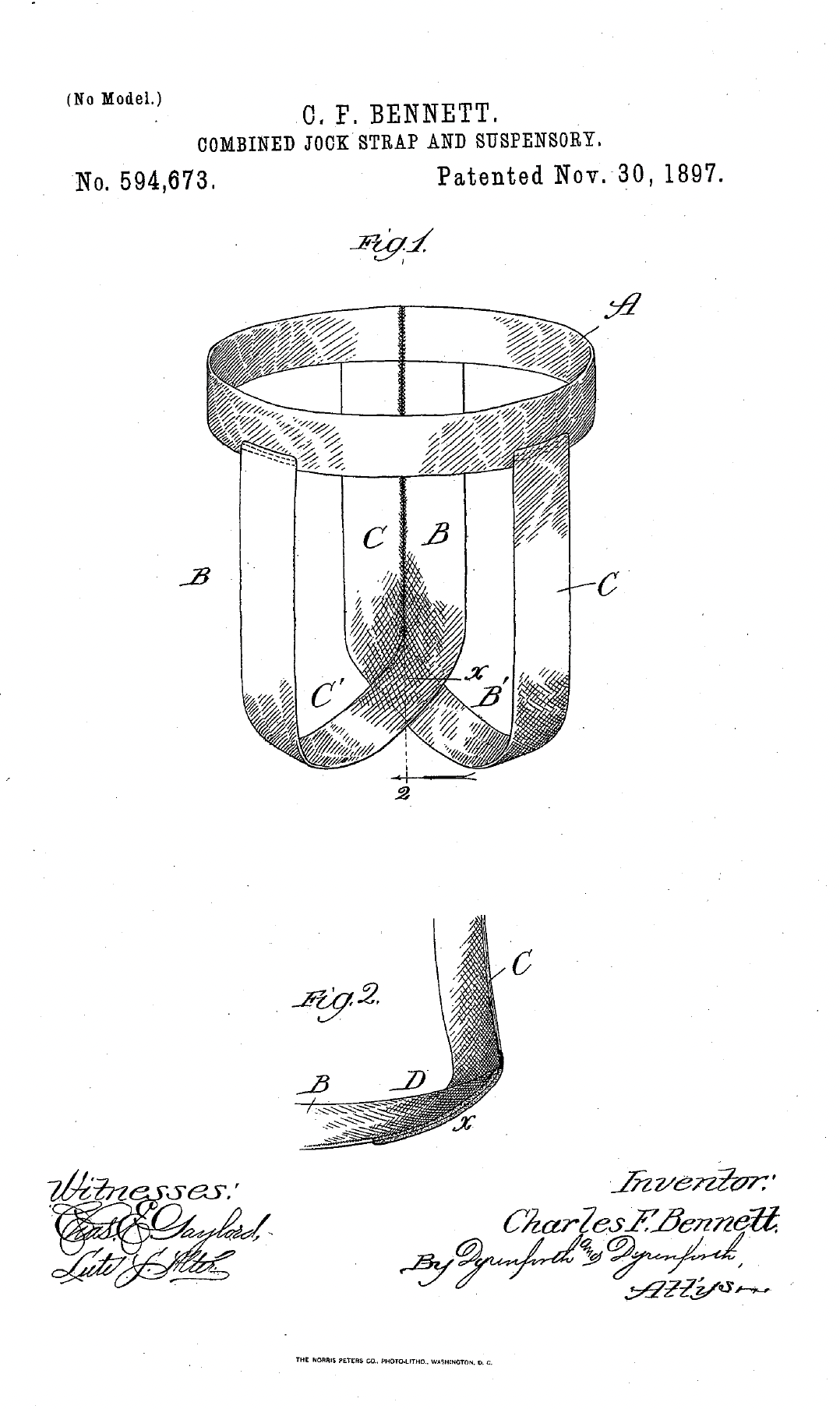

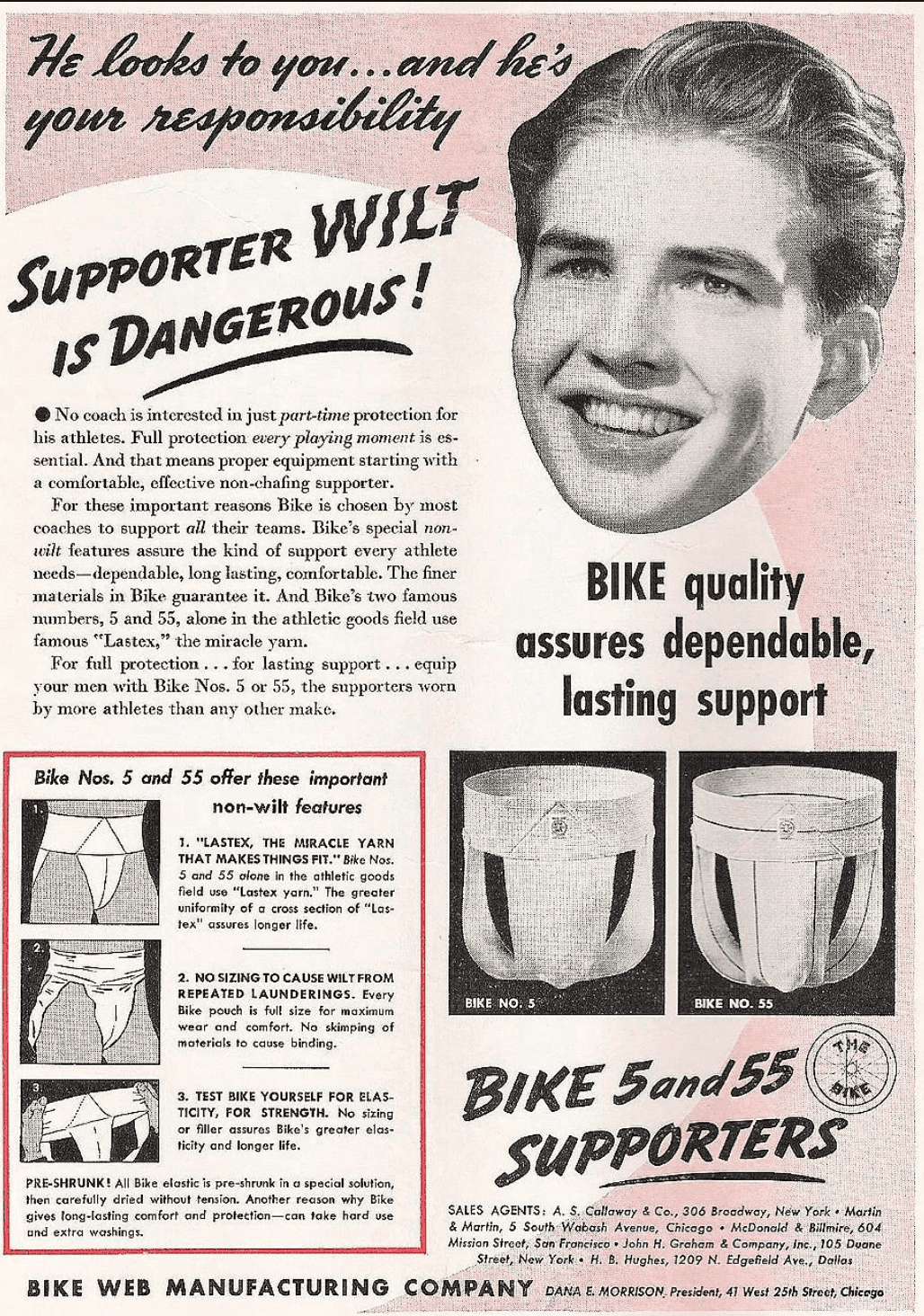

== Overview ==
The company later produced additional protective sports equipment such as multipurpose knee pads, elbow pads, gloves, shoulder pads, uniform jerseys, and pants for football, basketball, baseball, and softball. At one time, BIKE produced athletic shoes and a wider range of sports-related apparel.

In 2001, Bike was the official helmet supplier of the XFL American football league. Almost every player in the XFL wore a helmet made by the company.

In 2003, Bike was part of the Russell Corporation, which is a subsidiary of Berkshire Hathaway. In the first quarter of 2017, Russell Brands announced they would be closing down Bike.

On April 15, 2021, the brand was purchased by Alex Angelchik, as the lead investor. The brand launched a new website, and reopened for online sales, featuring a modernized version of their trademark "No. #10" jockstrap, as well as active apparel collections.

In the years following its relaunch, BIKE Athletic has focused on e-commerce distribution and expanded its product range to include additional underwear styles, athletic apparel, and themed collections such as the "Heritage Collection" and "Pride Collection." The company primarily operates as a direct-to-consumer brand and marked its 150th anniversary in 2024, highlighting over 350 million jockstraps sold since its founding.
