= Montrose District, Houston =

Human settlement in Houston, Texas, US

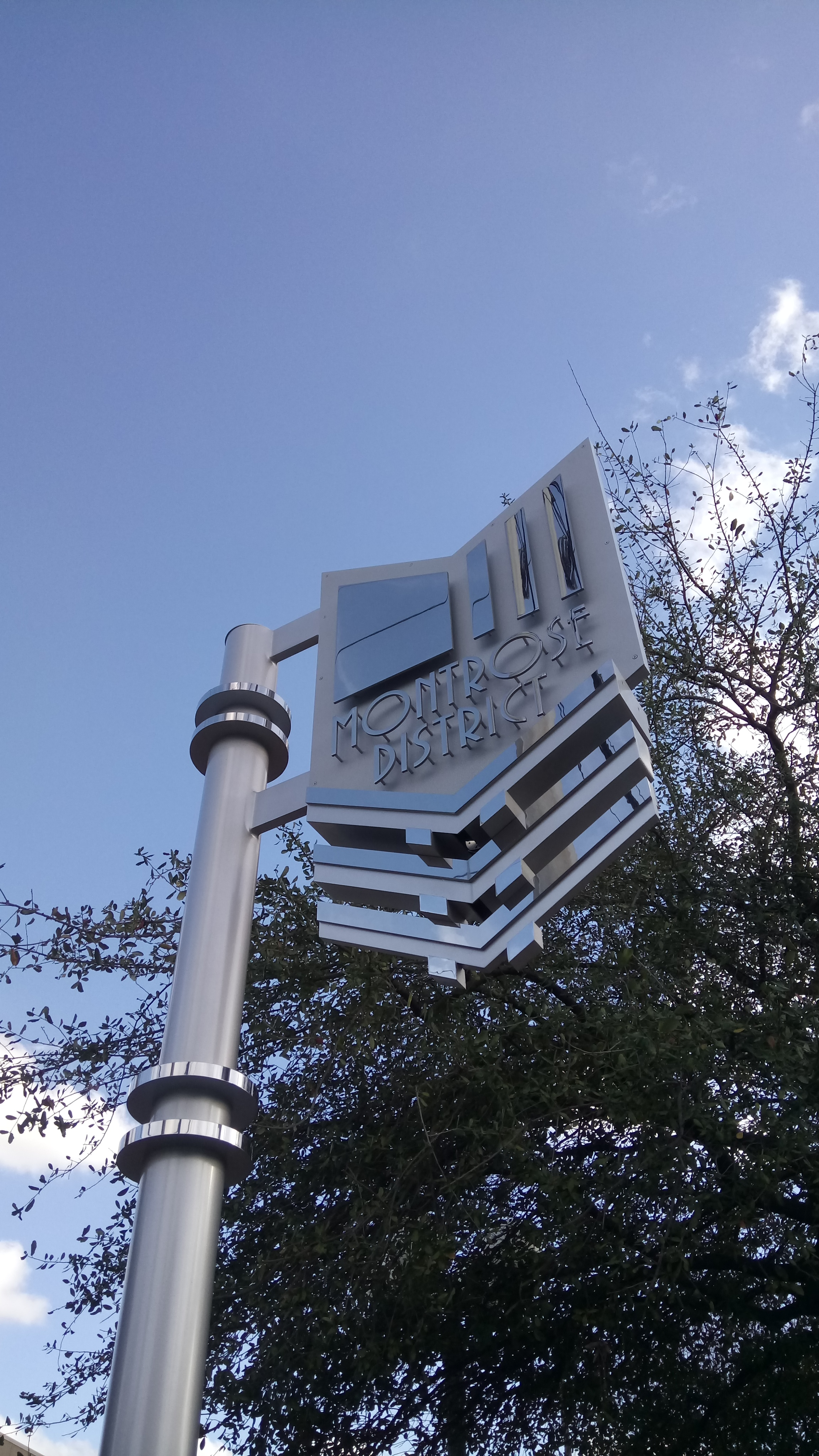
Montrose District sign

The Montrose District was a management district located in Houston, Texas, United States. The land was governed by the Montrose Management District.

The approximate boundaries of the district were Dallas Street (north), U.S. Route 59 (Southwest Freeway) (South), Montrose Boulevard (west), and Burlington and Taft Streets (East).

The Texas Legislature created the East Montrose Management District in 2005. In 2009 the West Montrose Management District opened, after a previous attempt had failed. The West Montrose district had a special provision which allowed it to merge with the East Montrose district. In February 2011 the boards of the districts agreed to consolidate the districts.

In October 2011 a group of business owners, called "Stop the District!", advocated for the dissolution of the district.

The district's board voted for its dissolution in 2018.

== Cityscape: Commercial And Residential ==
The district's boundaries are South Shepherd to the west, Spur 507 and Taft to the east, U.S. Route 59 (Southwest Freeway) and Binz to the south, and West Dallas Street to the north. About 1,400 commercial properties are within the district.

Montrose is one of the older neighborhoods of Houston.

== Government ==
The district had a 12.5 cent tax levied per $100 of a business's property value. The district uses the funds for business development, cultural promotion, public safety, planning of transportation, and visual improvements.

== Education ==
The district was within the Houston Independent School District.

Much of the district was served by Lanier Middle School, within the district. Other parts were served by the Gregory-Lincoln Education Center. At the time of dissolution, a small portion was served by Cullen Middle School; this was formerly zoned to Ryan Middle School.

Lamar High School served the entire district.
