= Quadratic integral =

In mathematics, a quadratic integral is an integral of the form $\int \frac{dx}{a+bx+cx^2}.$

It can be evaluated by completing the square in the denominator.

$\int \frac{dx}{a+bx+cx^2} = \frac{1}{c} \int \frac{dx}{\left( x + \frac{b}{2c} \right)^{\!2} + \left( \frac{a}{c} - \frac{b^2}{4c^2} \right)}.$

== Positive-discriminant case ==
Assume that the discriminant q = b^{2} − 4ac is positive. In that case, define u and A by $u = x + \frac{b}{2c},$ and $-A^2 = \frac{a}{c} - \frac{b^2}{4c^2} = \frac{1}{4c^2}(4ac - b^2).$

The quadratic integral can now be written as $\int \frac{dx}{a+bx+cx^2} = \frac{1}{c} \int \frac{du}{u^2-A^2} = \frac{1}{c} \int \frac{du}{(u+A)(u-A)}.$

The partial fraction decomposition $\frac{1}{(u+A)(u-A)} = \frac{1}{2A}\!\left( \frac{1}{u-A} - \frac{1}{u+A} \right)$ allows us to evaluate the integral: $\frac{1}{c} \int \frac{du}{(u+A)(u-A)} = \frac{1}{2Ac} \ln \left( \frac{u - A}{u + A} \right) + \text{constant}.$

The final result for the original integral, under the assumption that q > 0, is $\int \frac{dx}{a+bx+cx^2} = \frac{1}{ \sqrt{q}} \ln \left( \frac{2cx + b - \sqrt{q}}{2cx+b+ \sqrt{q}} \right) + \text{constant}.$

== Negative-discriminant case ==
In case the discriminant q = b^{2} − 4ac is negative, the second term in the denominator in $\int \frac{dx}{a+bx+cx^2} = \frac{1}{c} \int \frac{dx}{\left( x+ \frac{b}{2c} \right)^{\!2} + \left( \frac{a}{c} - \frac{b^2}{4c^2} \right)}.$ is positive. Then the integral becomes
$$\begin{align}
\frac{1}{c} \int \frac{du} {u^2 + A^2}
& = \frac{1}{cA} \int \frac{du/A}{(u/A)^2 + 1 } \\[9pt]
& = \frac{1}{cA} \int \frac{dw}{w^2 + 1} \\[9pt]
& = \frac{1}{cA} \arctan(w) + \mathrm{constant} \\[9pt]
& = \frac{1}{cA} \arctan\left(\frac{u}{A}\right) + \text{constant} \\[9pt]
& = \frac{1}{c\sqrt{\frac{a}{c} - \frac{b^2}{4c^2}}} \arctan \left(\frac{x + \frac{b}{2c}}{\sqrt{\frac{a}{c} - \frac{b^2}{4c^2}}}\right) + \text{constant} \\[9pt]
& = \frac{2}{\sqrt{4ac - b^2\, }} \arctan\left(\frac{2cx + b}{\sqrt{4ac - b^2}}\right) + \text{constant}.
\end{align}$$
