= Loafing (ice hockey) =

Ice hockey manoeuver

Loafing, floating, or cherry picking in ice hockey is a manoeuver in which a player, the floater (usually a forward, but occasionally a defenceman who used to play the forward position, but can no longer skate the complete length of the ice at pace), literally loafs — spends time in idleness — or casually skates behind the opposing team's unsuspecting defencemen while they are in their attacking zone. It is very similar to the cherry picking tactic sometimes used in basketball. Its controversy is also very similar to that of cherry picking in basketball.

== History ==
The tactic is used sparingly as although it sometimes creates a breakaway opportunity for the defending team should they manage to take control of the puck and pass it to the floater, it also creates a five-on-four situation (during even strength play) for the attacking team. Also, a good defenceman usually keeps an eye open for the development of these potential situations where he would immediately backcheck once a floater is spotted.

== See also ==
- Cherry picking (basketball)
