= Cherry picking (basketball) =

Basketball strategy

Cherry picking, in basketball and certain other sports, refers to play where one player (the cherry picker) does not play defense with the rest of the team, but rather remains near half court or closer to their own team's goal.

If the opponents do not designate a player to stay near the cherry picker, they will have a 5-on-4 advantage as they try to score, but if the defense steals the ball, it could make a long pass to the cherry picker for an uncontested basket. Acquiring the ball by a violation or foul, or after a made basket, the cherry picker is less relevant, as the opponents have more time to put their own defense in place.

Disapproval of cherry picking stems from the fact that the cherry picker is not playing the "complete" game and accumulates statistics for points scored that exaggerate the player's prowess.

== Legality ==
Cherry picking is uncommon but legal in organized basketball. In some amateur leagues, cherry picking—defined as a defender remaining in the opponents' backcourt after the opponents have advanced the ball to their forecourt—is a violation, penalized by loss of possession and of any resulting points.

== Methods ==
The cherry picker may "camp out", remaining on the player's offensive end to wait for a teammate to obtain the ball and pass it to the cherry picker for a shot before the defense can get back (as is also the case in the fast break).

Another method is "bolting" or "breaking" toward the other goal the moment the opponents launch a shot, without waiting to see the outcome of the shot. If the shot fails and the defense gets the rebound, the cherry picker can be positioned to receive a long pass and take an unguarded shot. Even after a made shot, the team that was on defense may signal for one or more players to run toward the other basket so as to enable one or more passes toward the goal before the opponents can set up their defense.

== Other uses ==
Cherry picking is also a strategy in video games that simulate basketball.

Analogs to cherry picking exist in other sports:

- Cherry picking in water polo is called "sea-gulling". Similar to the strategy in basketball, a swimmer of the defensive team remains on his or her offensive end and awaits a pass once teammates regain the ball.
- Cherry picking violates the offside rule of association football. In indoor football in many European countries, a rule named "Man over the line" prevents any player crossing the middle of the court, apparently to encourage more play in attack. In Britain, staying near the goal is informally called "goal hanging".
- Ice hockey also has an offside rule that prevents cherry picking, but "loafing" just outside the opponents' blue line can lead to breakaways if the loafer's opponent is unaware of it.

The term also refers to "picking" a rebound above the rim, a practice that may be a goaltending violation.
