= Ice hockey =

Team winter sport

- A forward (Bryan Rust of the Pittsburgh Penguins) shoots toward a net defended by a goaltender (Braden Holtby of the Washington Capitals).
- Highest governing body: IIHF
- First played: 1875; 151 years ago, Montreal, Quebec, Canada

Characteristics
- Contact: Men's – Full; Women's – Limited
- Team members: 3 forwards; 2 defencemen; 1 goaltender
- Mixed-sex: No
- Type: Winter team sport
- Equipment: Hockey pucks; Hockey sticks; Hockey skates; Shin pads; Shoulder pads; Gloves; Helmet (with visor or cage, depending on age of player and league); Elbow pads; jock or jill; Hockey jersey; hockey socks; Hockey pants; Neck guard (depends on league); Mouthguard (depends on league)
- Venue: Hockey rink or arena; Sometimes played on a frozen lake or pond for recreation

Presence
- Olympic: Men's, 1920 Summer Olympics; Men's, 1924 Winter Olympics to present; Women's, 1998 Winter Olympics to present
- Paralympic: Yes

Ice hockey, known simply as hockey in North America and parts of Europe, is a team sport played on ice skates, usually on an ice skating rink with lines and markings specific to the sport. It belongs to a family of sports called hockey. The two opposing teams score by using their sticks to control and advance a vulcanized rubber hockey puck, and then shooting it into the net of the other team. Each goal is worth one point. The team with the highest score after an hour of gameplay, broken down into three 20-minute periods, is declared the winner; ties are broken in overtime or a shootout. In a formal game, each team has six skaters on the ice at a time, barring any penalties, including a goaltender. It is a full contact game and one of the more physically demanding team sports.

The modern sport of ice hockey was developed in Canada, most notably in Montreal, where the first indoor game was played on March 3, 1875. It draws influence from shinty which originated in Scotland, as well as field hockey which originated in England. Amateur hockey leagues began in the 1880s, and professional ice hockey originated around 1900. The Stanley Cup, emblematic of ice hockey club supremacy, was initially commissioned in 1892 as the "Dominion Hockey Challenge Cup" and was first awarded in 1893 to recognise the Canadian amateur champion and later became the championship trophy of the National Hockey League (NHL). In the early 1900s, the Canadian rules were adopted by the Ligue Internationale de Hockey sur Glace, in Paris, France, the precursor to the International Ice Hockey Federation (IIHF). The sport was played for the first time at the Olympics during the 1920 Summer Games—today it is a mainstay at the Winter Olympics. In 1994, ice hockey was officially recognized as Canada's national winter sport.

While women also played the game during its early formative years, it was not until the mid-1980s when organizers began to officially remove body checking from female ice hockey that it began to gain wider popularity, which by then had spread to Europe and a variety of other countries. The IIHF Women's World Championship was held in 1990, and women's play was introduced into the Olympics in 1998.

== History ==
Ice hockey is believed to have evolved from simple stick and ball games played in the 18th and 19th centuries in Britain, Ireland, and elsewhere, primarily bandy, hurling, and shinty. The North American sport of lacrosse, derived from tribal Native American games, was also influential. The former games were brought to North America and several similar winter games using informal rules developed, such as shinny and ice polo, but later were absorbed into a new organized game with codified rules which today is ice hockey.

== Game ==
Traditional layout of an ice hockey rink surface.

An NHL ice hockey rink. It includes a trapezoid behind the goal line and a blue painted area in front of the goal. The blue lines are also closer together than they are on a traditional rink.

While the general characteristics of the game remain constant, the exact rules depend on the particular code of play being used. The two most important codes are those of the IIHF and the NHL. Both of these codes, and others, originated from Canadian rules of ice hockey of the early 20th century.

Ice hockey is played on a hockey rink. During normal play, there are six players on ice skates on the ice per side, one of them being the goaltender. The objective of the game is to score goals by shooting the puck into the opponent's goal net at the opposite end of the rink. The players use their sticks to pass or shoot the puck.

With certain restrictions, players are allowed to redirect the puck using any part of their body. However, they may not catch or hold the puck in their hand, and using the hands to pass the puck to a teammate is prohibited unless the player is in the defensive zone.

Players are permitted to knock the puck out of the air to themselves using their hands, but they may not kick the puck into the opposing net. Unintentional deflections off the body or equipment, including skates, are allowed. Deliberately batting the puck into the goal with the hands or any other part of the body is prohibited.

Hockey is an off-side game, meaning that forward passes are allowed, unlike in rugby. Before the 1930s, hockey was an on-side game, meaning that only backward passes were allowed. Those rules emphasized individual stick-handling to drive the puck forward. With the arrival of offside rules, the forward pass transformed hockey into a true team sport, where individual performance diminished in importance relative to team play, which could now be coordinated over the entire surface of the ice as opposed to merely rearward players.

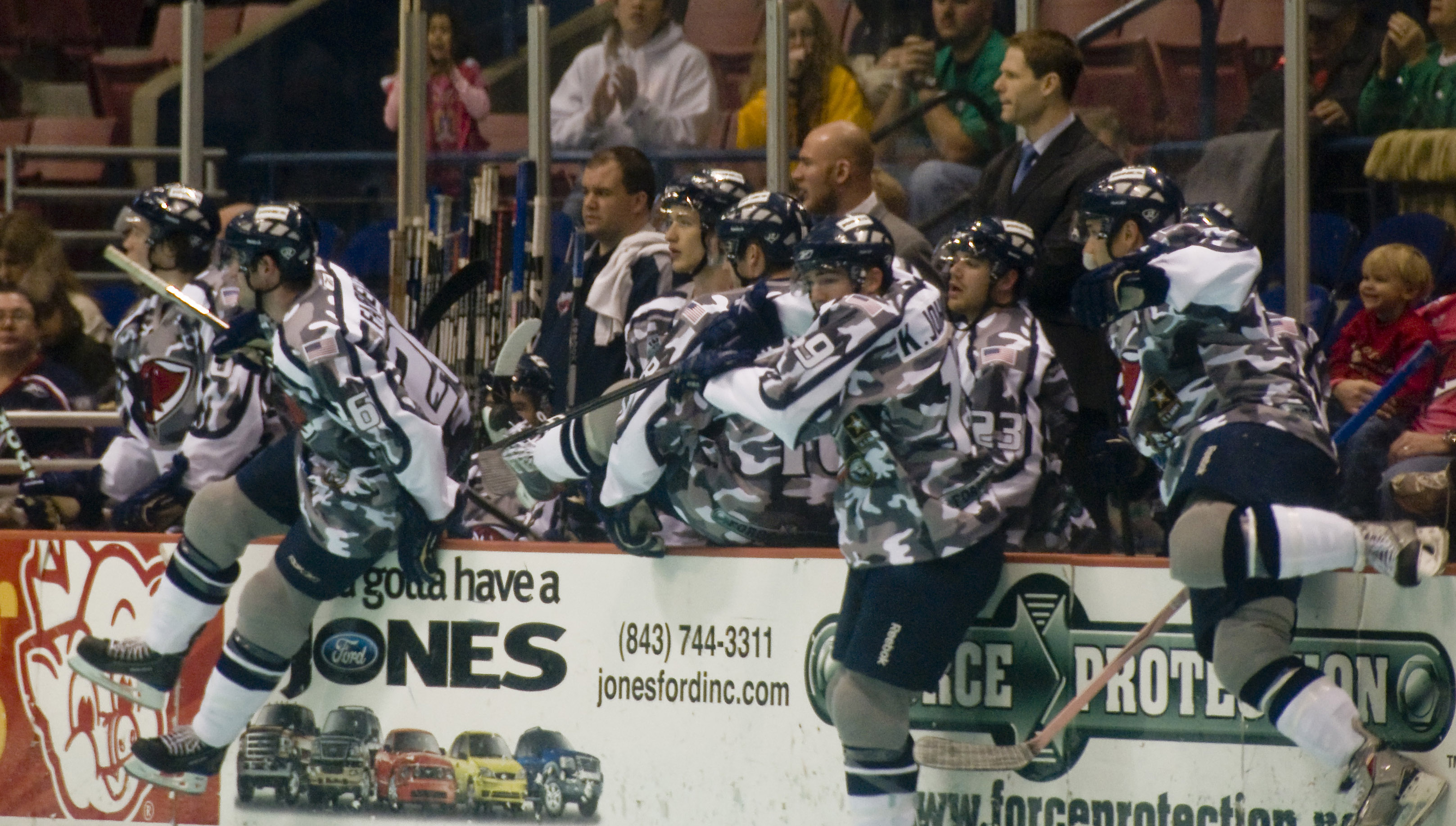
Players from the South Carolina Stingrays perform a line change. A line change is a substitution of an entire line at once.

The six players on each team are typically divided into three forwards, two defencemen, and one goaltender. The term skaters typically applies to all players except goaltenders. The forward positions consist of a centre and two wingers: a left wing and a right wing. Forwards often play together as units or lines, with the same three forwards always playing together. The defencemen usually stay together as a pair generally divided between left and right. Left and right side wingers or defencemen are generally positioned on the side on which they carry their stick. A substitution of an entire unit at once is called a line change. Teams typically employ alternate sets of forward lines and defensive pairings when short-handed or on a power play. The goaltender stands in a semi-circle, usually blue, called the crease in the defensive zone keeping pucks out of the goal. Substitutions are permitted at any time during the game, although during a stoppage of play the home team is permitted the final change. When players are substituted during play, it is called changing on the fly. An NHL rule added in the 2005–06 season prevents a team from making any player substitutions after they ice the puck.

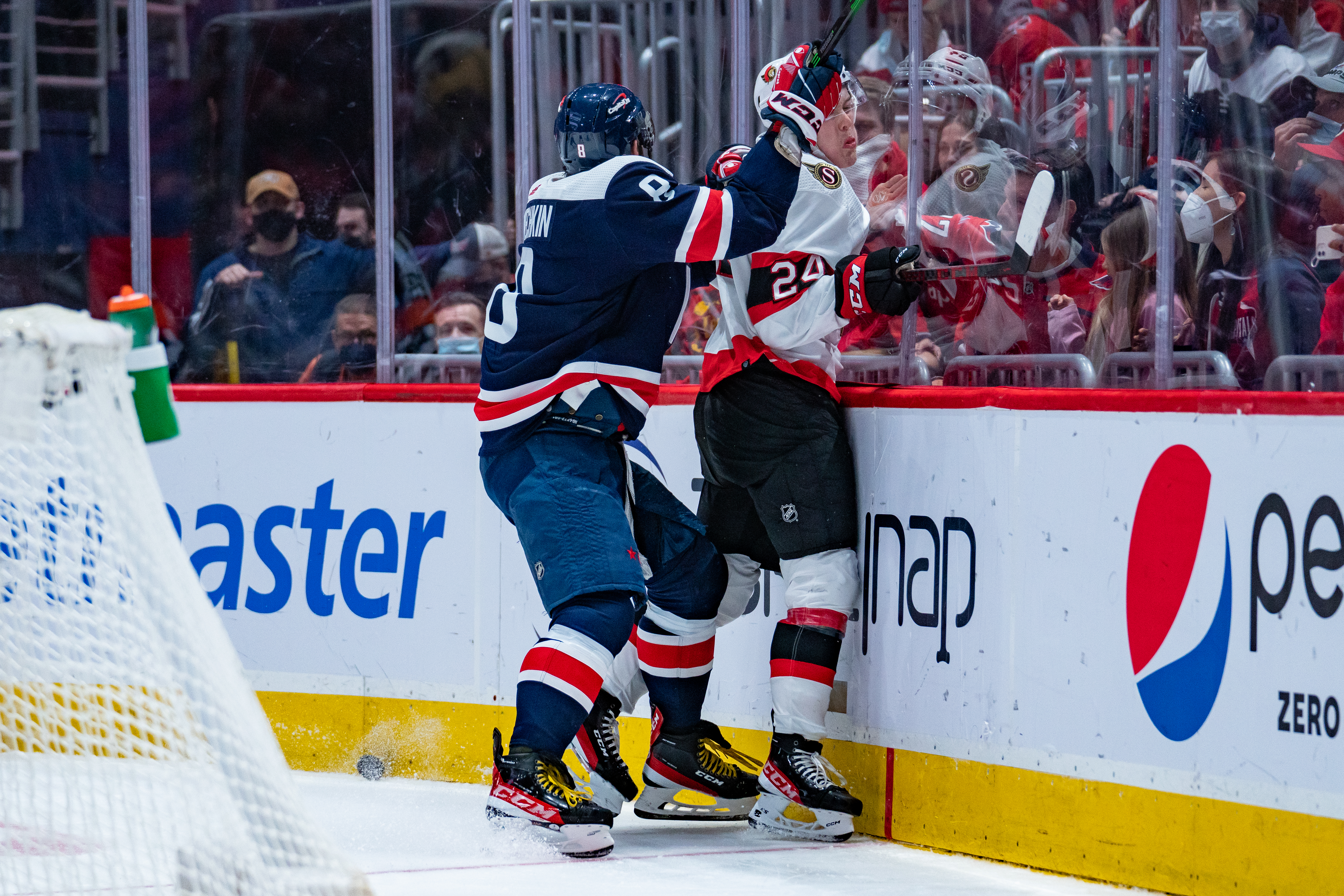
A player checks an opposing skater into the board that surrounds the ice.

The boards surrounding the ice help keep the puck in play and they can also be used as tools to play the puck. Players are permitted to bodycheck opponents into the boards to stop progress. The referees, linesmen and the outsides of the goal are "in play" and do not stop the game when the puck or players either bounce into or collide with them. Play can be stopped if the goal is knocked out of position. Play often proceeds for minutes without interruption. After a stoppage, play is restarted with a faceoff. Two players face each other and an official drops the puck to the ice, where the two players attempt to gain control of the puck. Circles marked on the rink indicate the locations for the faceoff and guide the positioning of players.

Three major rules of play in ice hockey limit the movement of the puck: offside, icing, and the puck going out of play.

- A player is offside if he enters his opponent's zone before the puck itself.
- Under many situations, a player may not "ice the puck", which means shooting the puck all the way across both the centre line and the opponent's goal line.
- The puck goes out of play whenever it goes past the perimeter of the ice rink (onto the player benches, over the glass, or onto the protective netting above the glass) and a stoppage of play is called by the officials using whistles. It does not matter if the puck comes back onto the ice surface from outside of the rink, because the puck is considered dead once it leaves the perimeter of the rink. The referee may also blow the whistle for a stoppage in play if the puck is jammed along the boards when two or more players are battling for the puck for a long time, or if the puck is stuck on the back of either of the two nets for a period of time.

Under IIHF rules, each team may carry a maximum of 20 players and two goaltenders on their roster. NHL rules restrict the total number of players per game to 18, plus two goaltenders. In the NHL, the players are usually divided into four lines of three forwards, and into three pairs of defencemen. On occasion, teams may elect to substitute an extra defenceman for a forward. The seventh defenceman may play as a substitute defenceman, spend the game on the bench, or if a team chooses to play four lines then this seventh defenceman may see ice-time on the fourth line as a forward.

=== Periods and overtime ===
A professional ice hockey game consists of three periods of twenty minutes, the clock running only when the puck is in play. There is a rest period between the three periods. The teams change ends after each period of play, including overtime. Recreational leagues and children's leagues often play shorter games, generally with three shorter periods of play.

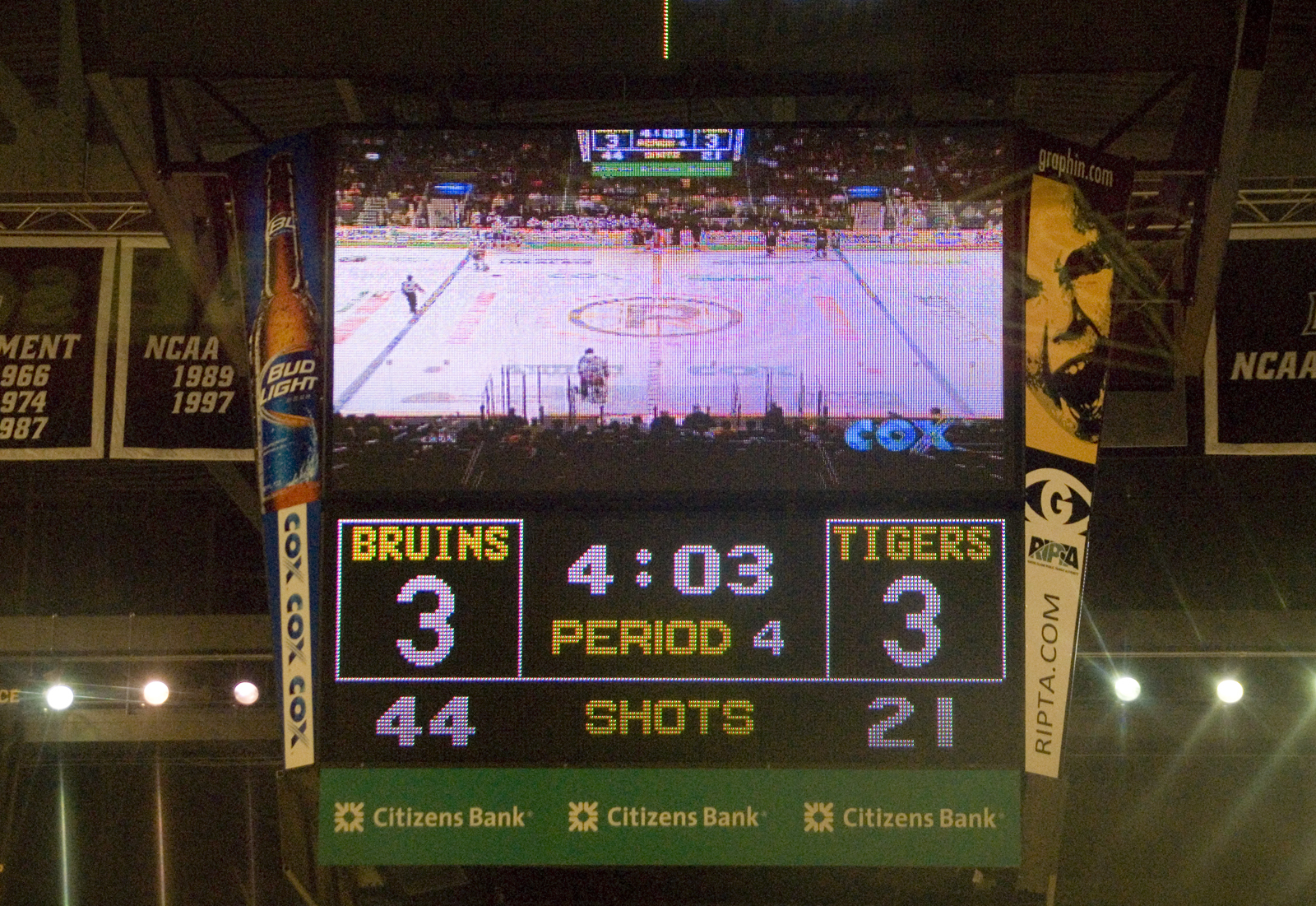
Scoreboard for a hockey game during the fourth period. If a game is tied at the end of the third period, several leagues and tournaments have teams play additional sudden death overtime periods.

If a tie occurs in tournament play, as well as in the NHL playoffs, North Americans favour sudden death overtime, in which the teams continue to play twenty-minute periods until a goal is scored. Up until the 1999–2000 season, regular-season NHL games were settled with a single five-minute sudden death period with five players (plus a goalie) per side, with both teams awarded one point in the standings in the event of a tie. With a goal, the winning team would be awarded two points and the losing team none (just as if they had lost in regulation). The total elapsed time from when the puck first drops, is about 2 hours and 20 minutes for a 60-minute game.

From the 1999–2000 until the 2003–04 seasons, the National Hockey League decided ties by playing a single five-minute sudden-death overtime period with each team having four skaters per side (plus the goalie). In the event of a tie, each team would still receive one point in the standings but in the event of a victory the winning team would be awarded two points in the standings and the losing team one point. The idea was to discourage teams from playing for a tie, since previously some teams might have preferred a tie and 1 point to risking a loss and zero points. The exception to this rule is if a team opts to pull their goalie in exchange for an extra skater during overtime and is subsequently scored upon (an empty net goal), in which case the losing team receives no points for the overtime loss. Since the 2015–16 season, the single five-minute sudden-death overtime session involves three skaters on each side. Since three skaters must always be on the ice in an NHL game, the consequences of penalties are slightly different from those during regulation play; any penalty during overtime that would result in a team losing a skater during regulation instead causes the other side to add a skater. Once the penalized team's penalty ends, the penalized skater exits the penalty box and the teams continue at 4-on-4 until the next stoppage of play, at which point the teams return to three skaters per side.

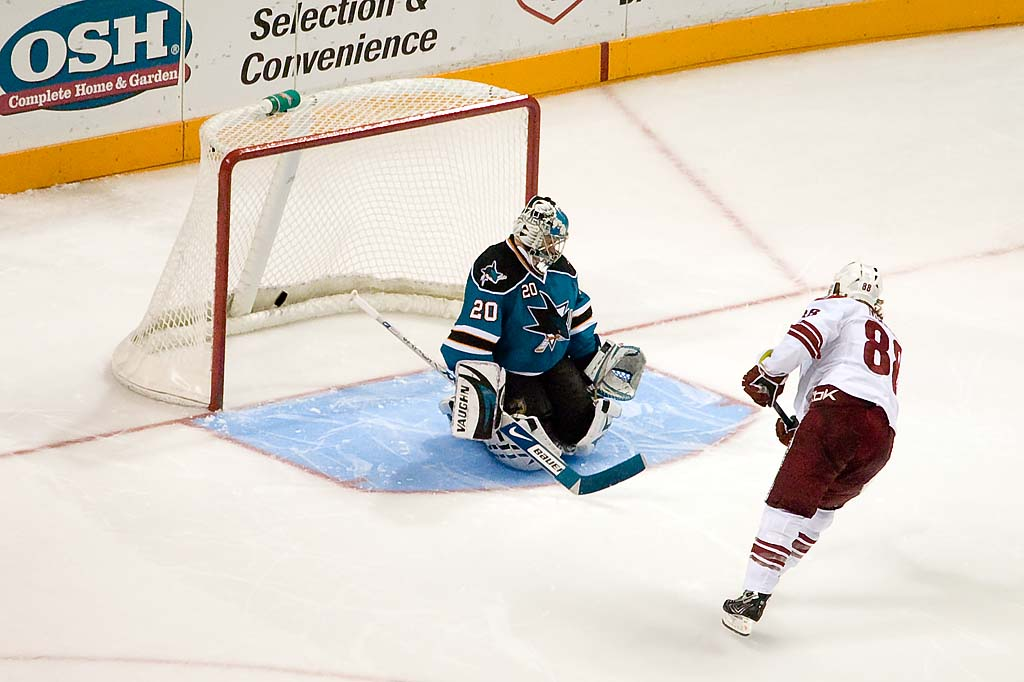
Several leagues and tournaments have implemented the shootout as a means to determine a winner, if the game remains tied after an extra overtime period.

International play and several North American professional leagues, including the NHL (in the regular season), now use an overtime period identical to that from 1999–2000 to 2003–04 followed by a penalty shootout. If the score remains tied after an extra overtime period, the subsequent shootout consists of three players from each team taking penalty shots. After these six total shots, the team with the most goals is awarded the victory. If the score is still tied, the shootout then proceeds to sudden death. Regardless of the number of goals scored by either team during the shootout, the final score recorded will award the winning team one more goal than the score at the end of regulation time. In the NHL if a game is decided in overtime or by a shootout the winning team is awarded two points in the standings and the losing team is awarded one point. Ties no longer occur in the NHL.

Overtime in the NHL playoffs differs from the regular season. In the playoffs there are no shootouts. If a game is tied after regulation, then a 20-minute period of 5-on-5 sudden-death overtime will be added. If the game is still tied after the overtime, another period is added until a team scores, which wins the match. Since 2019, the IIHF World Championships and the gold medal game in the Olympics use the same format, but in a 3-on-3 format.

=== Penalties ===
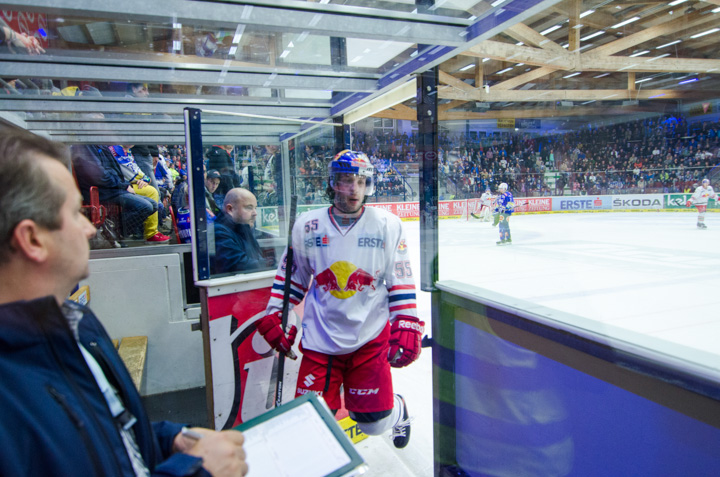
An ice hockey player enters the penalty box. Players may be sent to the penalty box for rule infractions, forcing their team to play with one less player for a specified time.

In ice hockey, infractions of the rules lead to a play stoppage whereby the play is restarted at a faceoff. Some infractions result in a penalty on a player or team. In the simplest case, the offending player is sent to the penalty box and their team must play with one less player on the ice for a designated time. Minor penalties last for two minutes, major penalties last for five minutes, and a double minor penalty is two consecutive penalties of two minutes duration. A single minor penalty may be extended by two minutes for causing visible injury to the victimized player. This is usually when blood is drawn during high sticking. Players may be also assessed personal extended penalties or game expulsions for misconduct in addition to the penalty or penalties their team must serve. The team that has been given a penalty is said to be playing short-handed while the opposing team is on a power play.

A two-minute minor penalty is often charged for lesser infractions such as tripping, elbowing, roughing, high-sticking, delay of the game, too many players on the ice, boarding, illegal equipment, charging (leaping into an opponent or body-checking him after taking more than two strides), holding, holding the stick (grabbing an opponent's stick), interference, hooking, slashing, kneeing, unsportsmanlike conduct (arguing a penalty call with referee, extremely vulgar or inappropriate verbal comments), "butt-ending" (striking an opponent with the knob of the stick), "spearing" (jabbing an opponent with the blade of the stick), or cross-checking. As of the 2005–2006 season, a minor penalty is also assessed for diving, where a player embellishes or simulates an offence. More egregious fouls may be penalized by a four-minute double-minor penalty, particularly those that injure the victimized player. These penalties end either when the time runs out or when the other team scores during the power play. In the case of a goal scored during the first two minutes of a double-minor, the penalty clock is set down to two minutes upon a score, effectively expiring the first minor penalty.

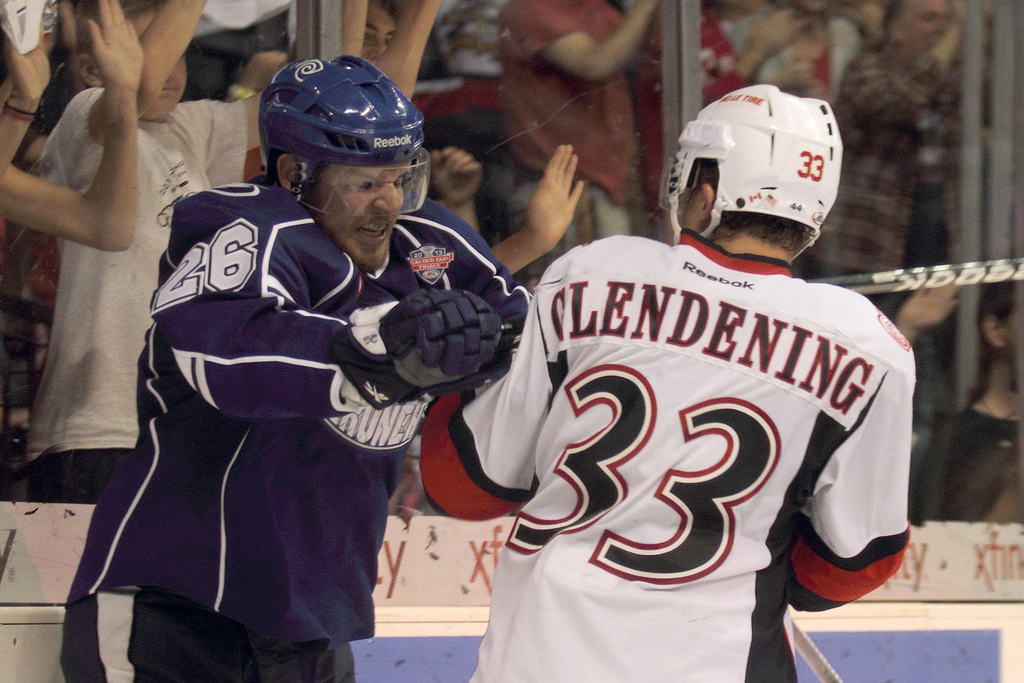
A skater cross-checking his opponent, checking him with the shaft of his stick with two hands.

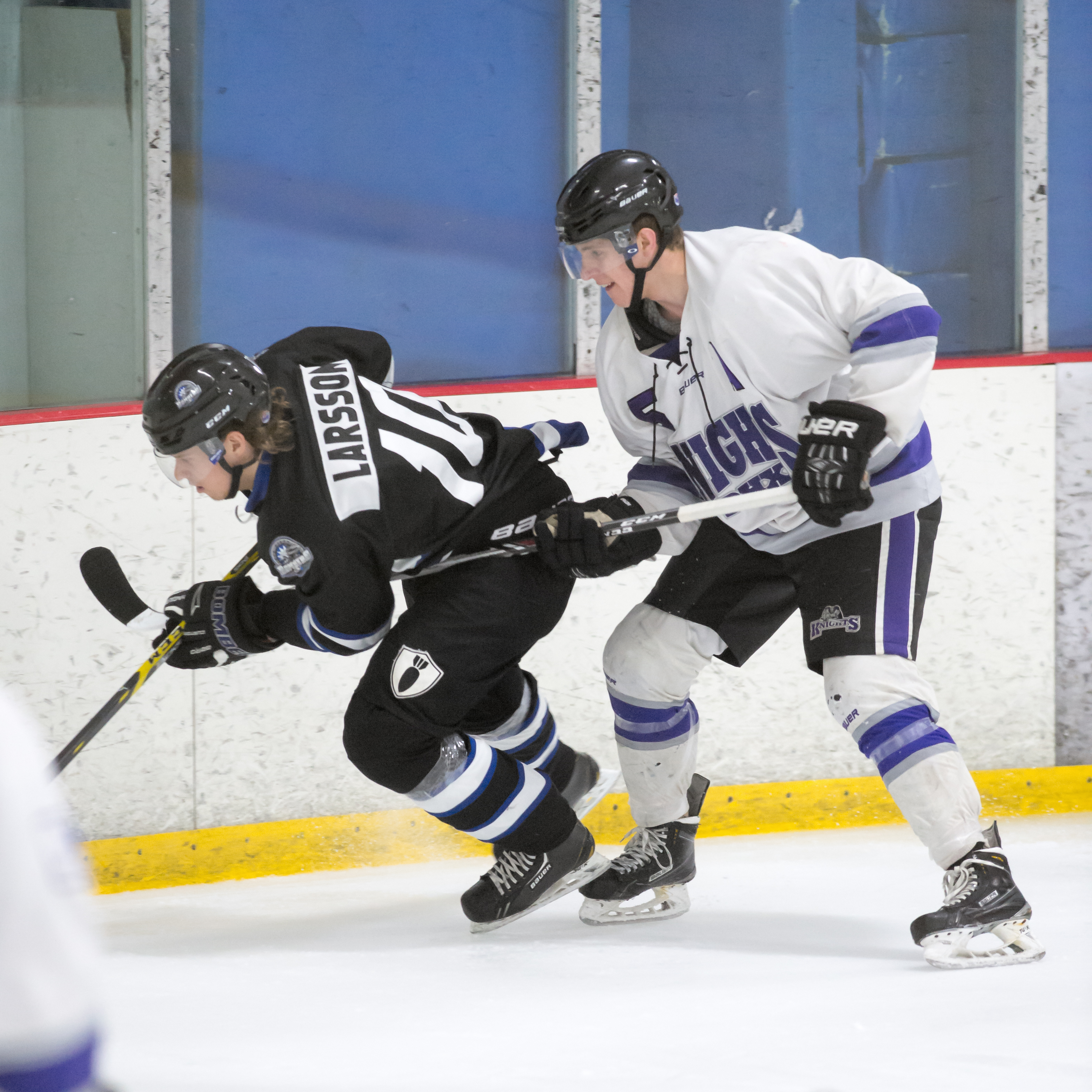
A skater hooking his opponent, using his stick to restrain him.

These are examples of rule infractions in the sport; a penalty may be assessed against the players committing them.

Five-minute major penalties are called for especially violent instances of most minor infractions that result in intentional injury to an opponent, or when a minor penalty results in visible injury (such as bleeding), as well as for fighting. Major penalties are always served in full; they do not terminate on a goal scored by the other team. Major penalties assessed for fighting are typically offsetting, meaning neither team is short-handed and the players exit the penalty box upon a stoppage of play following the expiration of their respective penalties. The foul of boarding (defined as "check[ing] an opponent in such a manner that causes the opponent to be thrown violently in the boards") is penalized either by a minor or major penalty at the discretion of the referee, based on the violent state of the hit. A minor or major penalty for boarding is often assessed when a player checks an opponent from behind and into the boards.

Some varieties of penalty do not require the offending team to play a man short. Concurrent five-minute major penalties in the NHL usually result from fighting. In the case of two players being assessed five-minute fighting majors, both the players serve five minutes without their team incurring a loss of player (both teams still have a full complement of players on the ice). This differs with two players from opposing sides getting minor penalties, at the same time or at any intersecting moment, resulting from more common infractions. In this case, both teams will have only four skating players (not counting the goaltender) until one or both penalties expire (if one penalty expires before the other, the opposing team gets a power play for the remainder of the time); this applies regardless of current pending penalties. In the NHL, a team always has at least three skaters on the ice. Thus, ten-minute misconduct penalties are served in full by the penalized player, but his team may immediately substitute another player on the ice unless a minor or major penalty is assessed in conjunction with the misconduct (a two-and-ten or five-and-ten). In this case, the team designates another player to serve the minor or major; both players go to the penalty box, but only the designee may not be replaced, and he is released upon the expiration of the two or five minutes, at which point the ten-minute misconduct begins. In addition, game misconducts are assessed for deliberate intent to inflict severe injury on an opponent (at the officials' discretion), or for a major penalty for a stick infraction or repeated major penalties. The offending player is ejected from the game and must immediately leave the playing surface (he does not sit in the penalty box); meanwhile, if an additional minor or major penalty is assessed, a designated player must serve out of that segment of the penalty in the box (similar to the above-mentioned "two-and-ten"). In some rare cases, a player may receive up to nineteen minutes in penalties for one string of plays. This could involve receiving a four-minute double-minor penalty, getting in a fight with an opposing player who retaliates, and then receiving a game misconduct after the fight. In this case, the player is ejected and two teammates must serve the double-minor and major penalties.

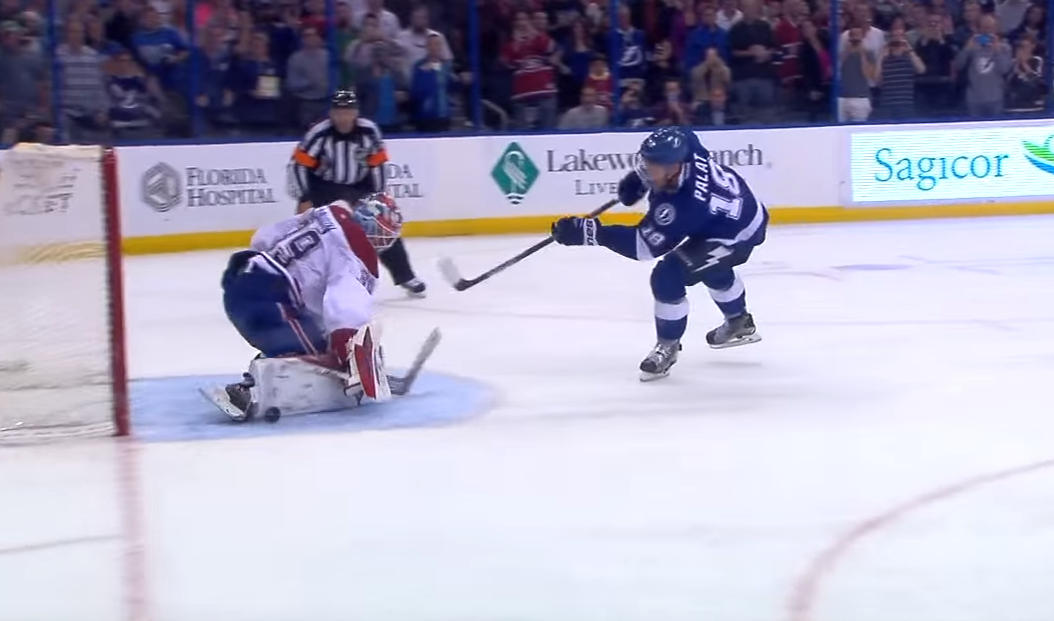
A skater taking a penalty shot, with a referee in the background. A referee may award a player with a penalty shot if they assess an infraction stopped the player from a clear scoring opportunity.

A penalty shot is awarded to a player when the illegal actions of another player stop a clear scoring opportunity, most commonly when the player is on a breakaway. A penalty shot allows the obstructed player to pick up the puck on the centre red-line and attempt to score on the goalie with no other players on the ice, to compensate for the earlier missed scoring opportunity. A penalty shot is also awarded for a defender other than the goaltender covering the puck in the goal crease, a goaltender intentionally displacing his own goal posts during a breakaway to avoid a goal, a defender intentionally displacing his own goal posts when there is less than two minutes to play in regulation time or at any point during overtime, or a player or coach intentionally throwing a stick or other object at the puck or the puck carrier and the throwing action disrupts a shot or pass play.

Officials also stop play for puck movement violations, such as using one's hands to pass the puck in the offensive end, but no players are penalized for these offences. The sole exceptions are deliberately falling on or gathering the puck to the body, carrying the puck in the hand, and shooting the puck out of play in one's defensive zone (all penalized two minutes for delay of game).

In the NHL, a unique penalty applies to the goalies. The goalies now are forbidden to play the puck in the "corners" of the rink near their own net. This will result in a two-minute penalty against the goalie's team. Only in the area in front of the goal line and immediately behind the net (marked by two red lines on either side of the net) can the goalie play the puck.

An additional rule that has never been a penalty, but was an infraction in the NHL before recent rules changes, is the two-line offside pass. Prior to the 2005–06 NHL season, play was stopped when a pass from inside a team's defending zone crossed the centre line, with a face-off held in the defending zone of the offending team. Now, the centre line is no longer used in the NHL to determine a two-line pass infraction, a change that the IIHF had adopted in 1998. Players are now able to pass to teammates who are more than the blue and centre ice red line away.

The NHL has taken steps to speed up the game of hockey and create a game of finesse, by reducing the number of illegal hits, fights, and "clutching and grabbing" that occurred in the past. Rules are now more strictly enforced, resulting in more penalties, which provides more protection to the players and facilitates more goals being scored. The governing body for United States' amateur hockey has implemented many new rules to reduce the number of stick-on-body occurrences, as well as other detrimental and illegal facets of the game ("zero tolerance").

In men's hockey, but not in women's, a player may use his hip or shoulder to hit another player if the player has the puck or is the last to have touched it. This use of the hip and shoulder is called body checking. Not all physical contact is legal—in particular, hits from behind, hits to the head and most types of forceful stick-on-body contact are illegal.

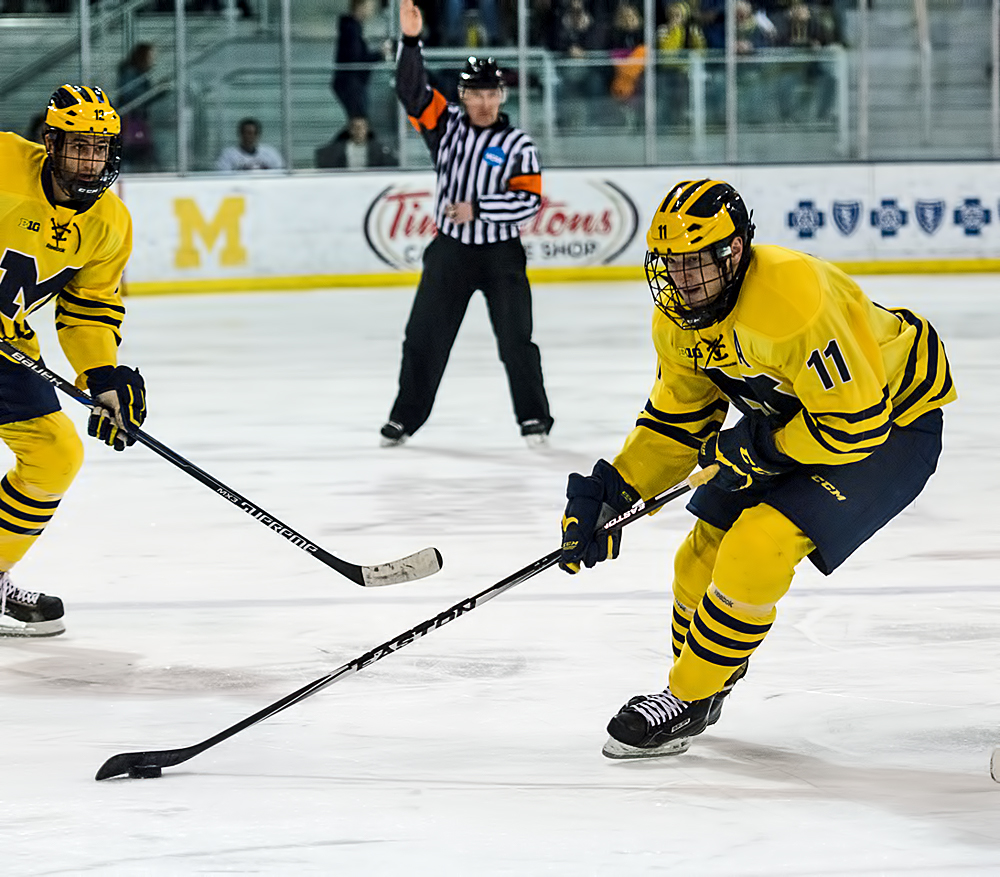
A referee calls a delayed penalty, which sees play continue until a goal is scored, or the opposing team regains control of the puck.

A delayed penalty call occurs when an offence is committed by the team that does not have possession of the puck. In this circumstance the team with possession of the puck is allowed to complete the play; that is, play continues until a goal is scored, a player on the opposing team gains control of the puck, or the team in possession commits an infraction or penalty of their own. Because the team on which the penalty was called cannot control the puck without stopping play, it is impossible for them to score a goal. In these cases, the team in possession of the puck can pull the goalie for an extra attacker without fear of being scored on. It is possible for the controlling team to mishandle the puck into their own net. If a delayed penalty is signalled and the team in possession scores, the penalty is still assessed to the offending player, but not served. In 2012, this rule was changed by the United States' National Collegiate Athletic Association (NCAA) for college level hockey. In college games, the penalty is still enforced even if the team in possession scores.

=== Officials ===
A typical game of hockey is governed by two to four officials on the ice, charged with enforcing the rules of the game. There are typically two linesmen who are mainly responsible for calling "offside" and "icing" violations, breaking up fights, and conducting faceoffs, and one or two referees, who call goals and all other penalties. Linesmen can report to the referee(s) that a penalty should be assessed against an offending player in some situations. The restrictions on this practice vary depending on the governing rules. On-ice officials are assisted by off-ice officials who act as goal judges, time keepers, and official scorers.

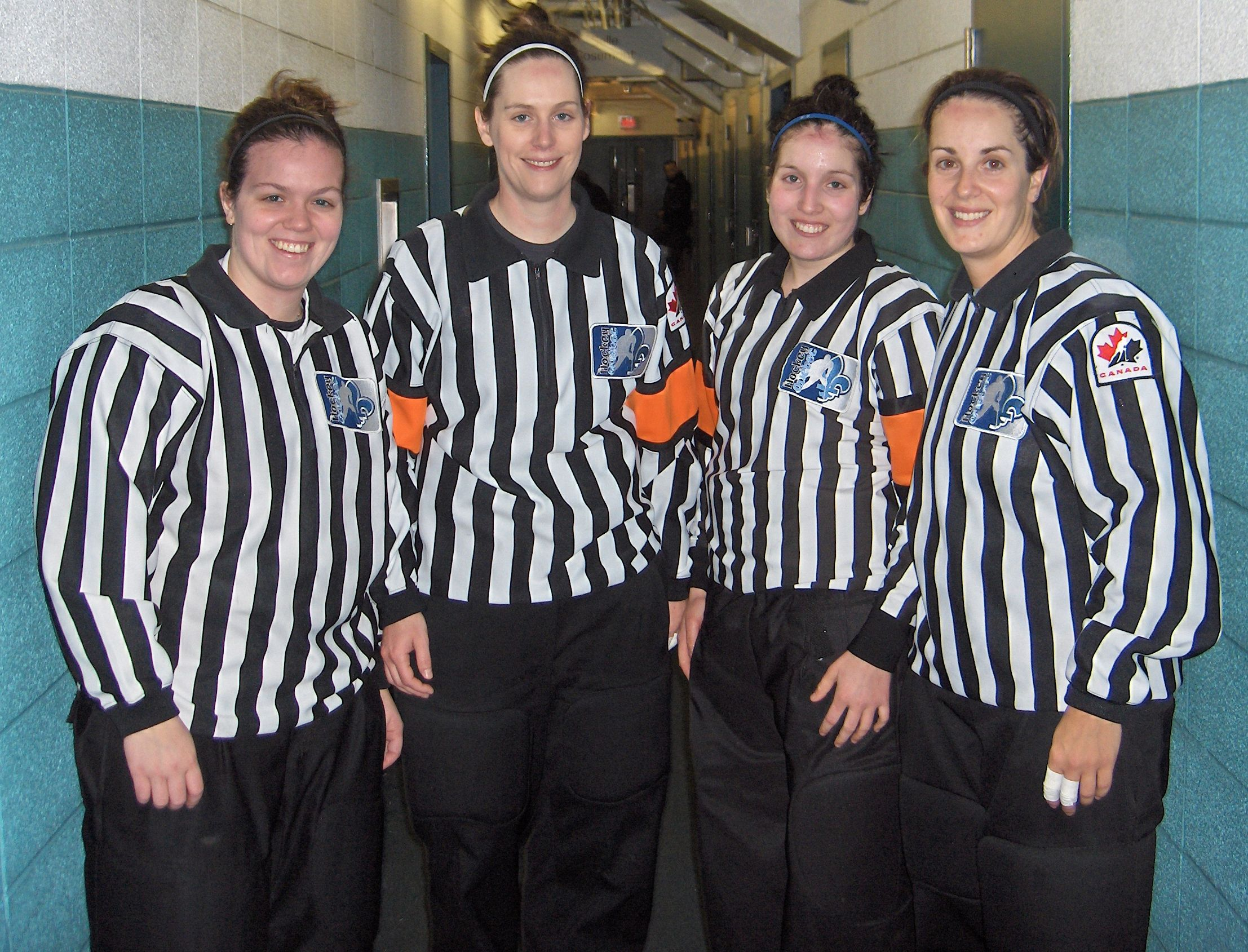
Officials working under a four-official system. Orange armbands are worn by the referees to distinguish them from the lineswomen.

The most widespread system is the "three-man system", which uses one referee and two linesmen. A less commonly used system is the two referee and one linesman system. This system is close to the regular three-man system except for a few procedure changes. Beginning with the National Hockey League, a number of leagues have implemented the "four-official system", where an additional referee is added to aid in the calling of penalties normally difficult to assess by one referee. The system is used in every NHL game since 2001, at IIHF World Championships, the Olympics and in many professional and high-level amateur leagues in North America and Europe.

Officials are selected by the league they work for. Amateur hockey leagues use guidelines established by national organizing bodies as a basis for choosing their officiating staffs. In North America, the national organizing bodies Hockey Canada and USA Hockey approve officials according to their experience level as well as their ability to pass rules knowledge and skating ability tests. Hockey Canada has officiating levels I through VI. USA Hockey has officiating levels 1 through 4.

=== Equipment ===
==== Protective gear ====
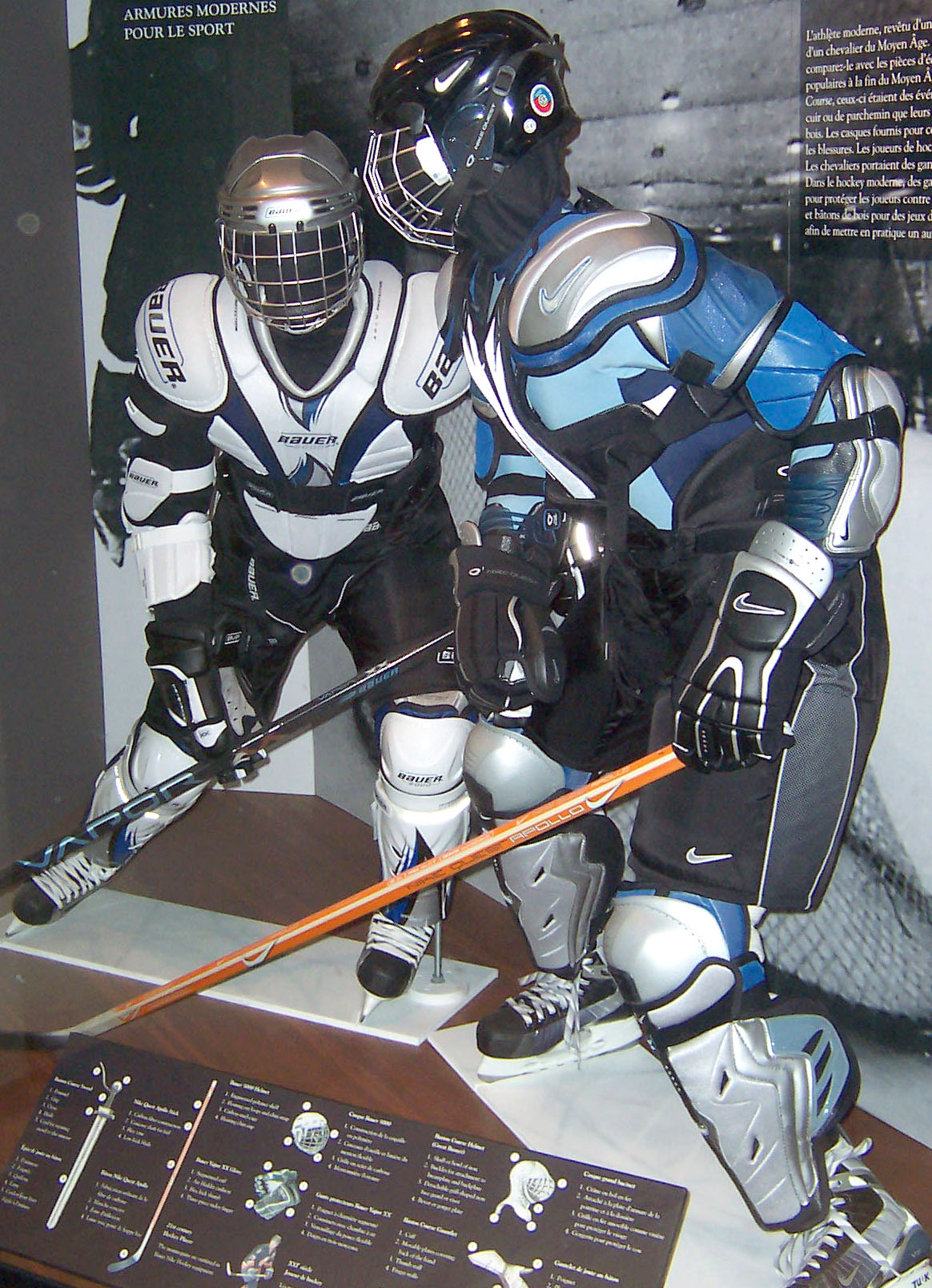
Models with the protective equipment worn by ice hockey skaters, such as a helmet, shoulder pads, elbow pads, gloves, hockey pants, and shin guards.

Since men's ice hockey is a full-contact sport, body checks are allowed so injuries are a common occurrence. Protective equipment is mandatory and is enforced in all competitive situations. This includes a helmet with either a visor or a full face mask, shoulder pads, elbow pads, mouth guard, protective gloves, heavily padded shorts (also known as hockey pants) or a girdle, athletic cup (also known as a jock, for males; and jill, for females), shin pads, skates, and (optionally) a neck protector.

==== Goaltenders ====
Goaltenders use different equipment. With hockey pucks approaching them at speeds of up to 100 mph (160 km/h) they must wear equipment with more protection. Goaltenders wear specialized goalie skates (these skates are built more for movement side to side rather than forwards and backwards), a jock or jill, large leg pads (there are size restrictions in certain leagues), blocking glove, catching glove, a chest protector, a goalie mask, and a large jersey. Goaltenders' equipment has continually become larger and larger, leading to fewer goals in each game and many official rule changes.

==== Ice skates ====
Ice hockey skates are optimized for physical acceleration, speed and manoeuvrability. This includes rapid starts, stops, turns, and changes in skating direction. In addition, they must be rigid and tough to protect the skater's feet from contact with other skaters, sticks, pucks, the boards, and the ice itself. Rigidity also improves the overall manoeuvrability of the skate. Blade length, thickness (width), and curvature (rocker/radius) (front to back) and radius of hollow (across the blade width) are quite different from speed or figure skates. Hockey players usually adjust these parameters based on their skill level, position, and body type. The blade width of most skates are about 1/8 inch (3.2 mm) thick.

==== Ice hockey stick ====
Each player other than the goaltender carries a stick consisting of a long, relatively wide, and slightly curved flat blade, attached to a shaft. The curve itself has a big impact on its performance. A deep curve allows for lifting the puck easier while a shallow curve allows for easier backhand shots. The flex of the stick also impacts the performance. Typically, a less flexible stick is meant for a stronger player since the player is looking for the right balanced flex that allows the stick to flex easily while still having a strong "whip-back" which sends the puck flying at high speeds. It is quite distinct from sticks in other sports games and most suited to hitting and controlling the flat puck. Its unique shape contributed to the early development of the game.

The goaltender carries a stick of a different design, with a larger blade and a wide, flat shaft. This stick is primarily intended to block shots, but the goaltender may use it to play the puck as well.

== Injury ==
Ice hockey is a full-contact sport and carries a high risk of injury. Players are moving at speeds around 20–30 mph (30–50 km/h) and much of the game revolves around the physical contact between the players. Skate blades, hockey sticks, shoulder contact, hip contact, and hockey pucks can all potentially cause injuries. Lace bite, an irritation felt on the front of the foot or ankle, is a common ice hockey injury.

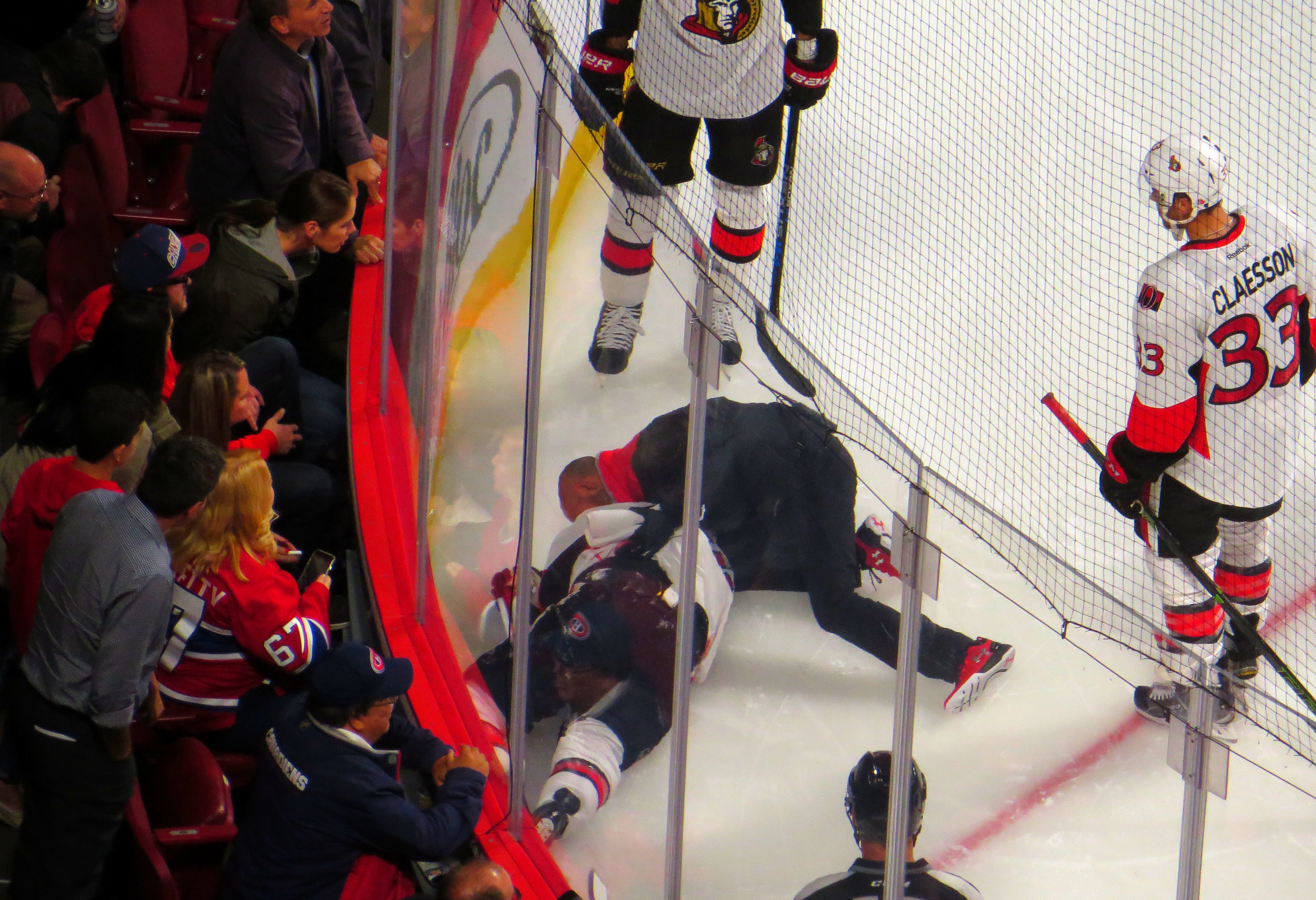
An injured skater being attended to after hitting the endboards. Because ice hockey is a full-contact sport, and involves players moving at high speeds, injuries can occur during play.

Compared to athletes who play other sports, ice hockey players are at higher risk of overuse injuries and injuries caused by early sports specialization by teenagers.

According to the Hughston Health Alert, prior to the widespread use of helmets and face cages, "Lacerations to the head, scalp, and face are the most frequent types of injury [in hockey]."

One of the leading causes of head injury is body checking from behind. Due to the danger of delivering a check from behind, many leagues – including the NHL – have made this a major and game misconduct penalty. Another type of check that accounts for many of the player-to-player contact concussions is a check to the head resulting in a misconduct penalty (called "head contact"). In recent years, the NHL has implemented new rules which penalize and suspend players for illegal checks to the heads, as well as checks to unsuspecting players. Studies show that ice hockey causes 44.3% of all sports-related traumatic brain injuries among Canadian children.

Some teams in the Swiss National League are testing out systems that combine helmet-integrated sensors and analysis software to reveal a player's ongoing brain injury risk during a game. These sensors provide players and coaches with real-time data on head impact strength, frequency, and severity. Furthermore, if the app determines that a particular impact has the potential to cause brain injury, it will alert the coach who can in turn seek medical attention for the individual.

== Tactics ==
=== Defensive tactics ===
Defensive ice hockey tactics vary from more active to more conservative styles of play. One distinction is between man-to-man oriented defensive systems, and zonal oriented defensive systems, though a lot of teams use a combination between the two. Defensive skills involve pass interception, shot blocking, and stick checking (in which an attempt to take away the puck or cut off the puck lane is initiated by the stick of the defensive player). Tactical points of emphasis in ice hockey defensive play are concepts like "managing gaps" (gap control), "boxing out"' (not letting the offensive team go on the inside), and "staying on the right side" (of the puck). Another popular concept in ice hockey defensive tactics is that of playing a 200-foot game.

==== Checking ====
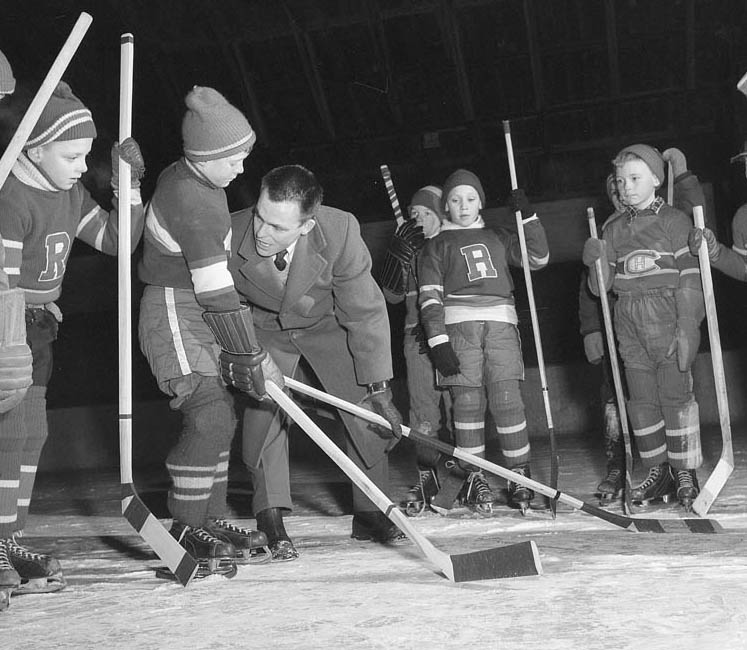
Youths being taught how to properly deliver a check in ice hockey.

An important defensive tactic is checking—attempting to take the puck from an opponent or to remove the opponent from play. Stick checking, sweep checking, and poke checking are legal uses of the stick to obtain possession of the puck. The neutral zone trap is designed to isolate the puck carrier in the neutral zone preventing him from entering the offensive zone. Body checking is using one's shoulder or hip to strike an opponent who has the puck or who is the last to have touched it (the last person to have touched the puck is still legally "in possession" of it, although a penalty is generally called if he is checked more than two seconds after his last touch). Body checking is also a penalty in certain leagues in order to reduce the chance of injury to players. Often the term checking is used to refer to body checking, with its true definition generally only propagated among fans of the game.

One of the most important strategies for a team is their forecheck. Forechecking is the act of attacking the opposition in their defensive zone. Forechecking is an important part of the dump and chase strategy (i.e. shooting the puck into the offensive zone and then chasing after it). Each team uses their own unique system but the main ones are: 2–1–2, 1–2–2, and 1–4. The 2–1–2 is the most basic forecheck system where two forwards go in deep and pressure the opposition's defencemen, the third forward stays high and the two defencemen stay at the blueline. The 1–2–2 is a somewhat more conservative system where one forward pressures the puck carrier and the other two forwards cover the oppositions' wingers, with the two defencemen staying at the blueline. The 1–4 is the most defensive forecheck system, referred to as the neutral zone trap, where one forward applies pressure to the puck carrier around the oppositions' blueline and the other four players stand basically in a line by their blueline in hopes the opposition will skate into one of them. Another strategy is the left wing lock, which has two forwards pressure the puck and the left wing and the two defencemen stay at the blueline.

=== Offensive tactics ===
Offensive tactics include improving a team's position on the ice by advancing the puck out of one's zone towards the opponent's zone, progressively by gaining lines, first your own blue line, then the red line and finally the opponent's blue line. NHL rules instated for the 2006 season redefined the offside rule to make the two-line pass legal; a player may pass the puck from behind his own blue line, past both that blue line and the centre red line, to a player on the near side of the opponents' blue line. Offensive tactics are designed ultimately to score a goal by taking a shot. When a player purposely directs the puck towards the opponent's goal, he or she is said to "shoot" the puck.

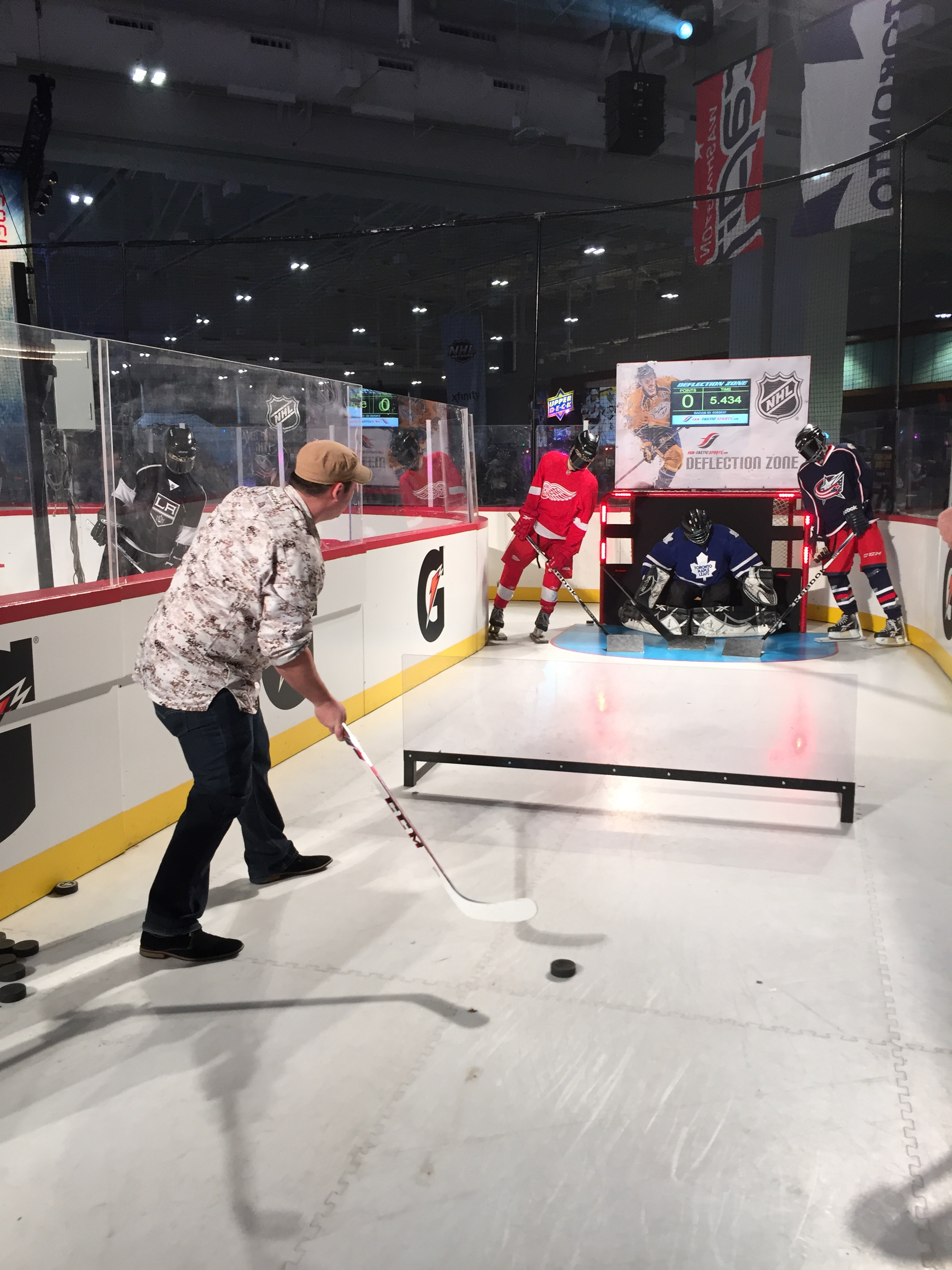
An NHL fan exhibit, where guests attempt to deflect the puck in order to score.

A deflection is a shot that redirects a shot or a pass towards the goal from another player, by allowing the puck to strike the stick and carom towards the goal. A one-timer is a shot struck directly off a pass, without receiving the pass and shooting in two separate actions. Headmanning the puck, also known as breaking out, is the tactic of rapidly passing to the player farthest down the ice. Loafing, also known as cherry-picking, is when a player, usually a forward, skates behind an attacking team, instead of playing defence, in an attempt to create an easy scoring chance.

A team that is losing by one or two goals in the last few minutes of play will often elect to pull the goalie; that is, remove the goaltender and replace him or her with an extra attacker on the ice in the hope of gaining enough advantage to score a goal. This is a desperate act, as it sometimes leads to the opposing team extending their lead by scoring a goal in the empty net.

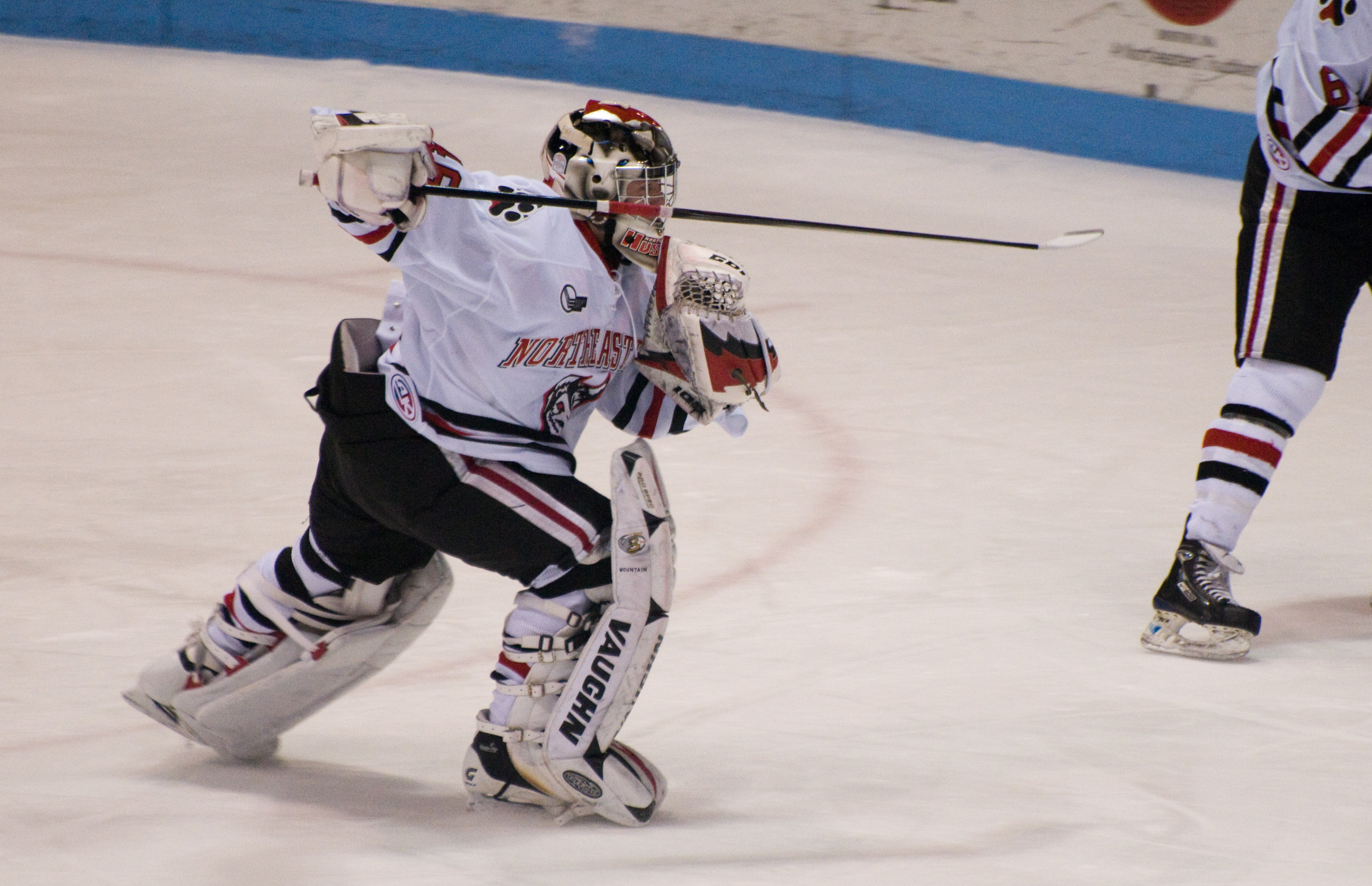
A goalie heads to the bench in order to allow for an extra attacker.

There are many other little tactics used in the game of hockey. Cycling moves the puck along the boards in the offensive zone to create a scoring chance by making defenders tired or moving them out of position. Pinching is when a defenceman pressures the opposition's winger in the offensive zone when they are breaking out, attempting to stop their attack and keep the puck in the offensive zone. A saucer pass is a pass used when an opposition's stick or body is in the passing lane. It is the act of raising the puck over the obstruction and having it land on a teammate's stick.

A deke, short for "decoy", is a feint with the body or stick to fool a defender or the goalie. Many modern players, such as Pavel Datsyuk, Sidney Crosby and Patrick Kane, have picked up the skill of "dangling", which is fancier deking and requires more stick handling skills.

A tactic used by a player to keep possession of the puck is stick handling and also known as ragging. A player can use their stick to manipulate the puck out of reach of opposing players, while attempting to skate past them. When combined with deking or dangling skills, a player can attempt an end-to-end rush and make a solo play to score. Ragging is also a common penalty-killing tactic to use up time during a penalty's duration.

=== Fights ===
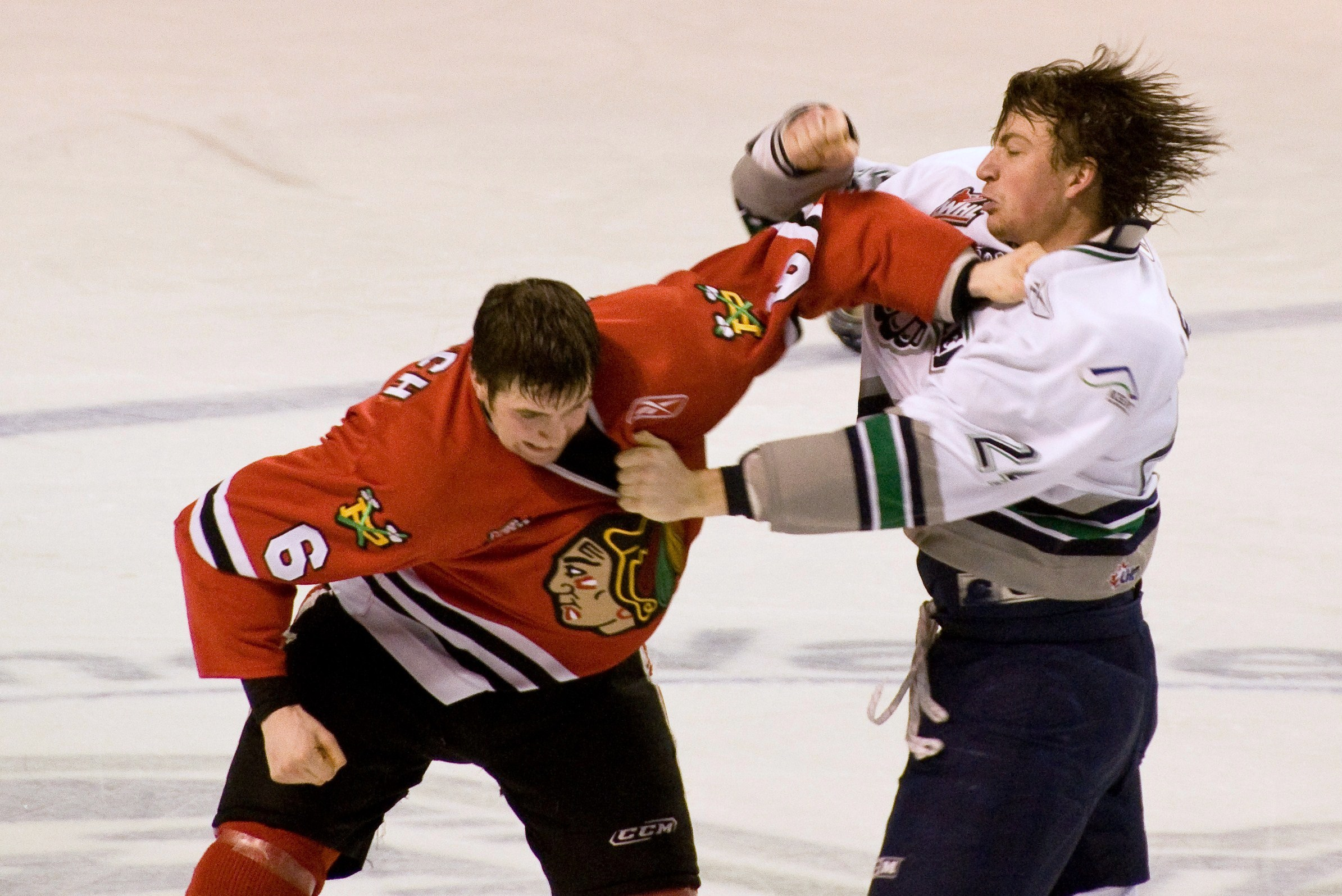
Fighting is prohibited by the rules but is common in North America.

Although fighting is officially prohibited in the rules, it is not an uncommon occurrence at the professional level, and its prevalence has been both a target of criticism and a considerable draw for the sport. At the professional level in North America fights are unofficially condoned. Enforcers and other players fight to demoralize the opposing players while exciting their own, as well as settling personal scores. A fight will also break out if one of the team's skilled players gets hit hard or someone receives what the team perceives as a dirty hit. The amateur game penalizes fisticuffs more harshly, as a player who receives a fighting major is also assessed at least a 10-minute misconduct penalty (NCAA and some Junior leagues) or a game misconduct penalty and suspension (high school and younger, as well as some casual adult leagues).

== Women's ice hockey ==
=== History ===
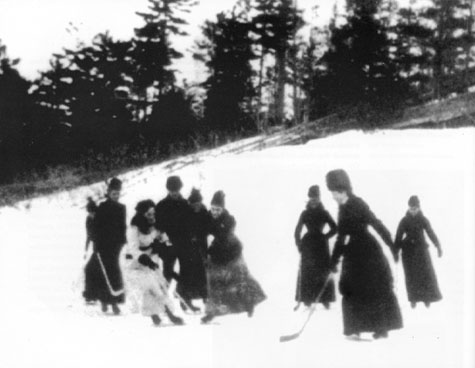
Women playing ice hockey, c. 1888. The daughter of Lord Stanley of Preston, Lady Isobel Gathorne-Hardy, is visible in white.

Women began playing the game of ice hockey in the late 19th century. Several games were recorded in the 1890s in Ottawa, Ontario, Canada. The women of Lord Stanley's family were known to participate in the game of ice hockey on the outdoor ice rink at Rideau Hall, the residence of Canada's Governor General.

The earliest available records of women's ice hockey were in the late 19th-century in Canada. Much like the men's game, women had previously been playing a conglomeration of stick-and-ball ice games. As with men's hockey, the women's game developed at first without an organizing body. A tournament in 1902 between Montreal and Trois-Rivières was billed as the first women's ice hockey championship tournament. Several tournaments, such as at the Banff Winter Carnival, were held in the early 20th century with numerous women's teams such as the Seattle Vamps and Vancouver Amazons. Organizations started to develop in the 1920s, such as the Ladies Ontario Hockey Association in Canada, and later, the Dominion Women's Amateur Hockey Association.

Starting in Canada in 1961, the women's game spread to more universities after the Fitness and Amateur Sport Act came into force in whereby the Government of Canada made an official commitment to "encourage, promote and develop fitness and amateur sport in Canada."

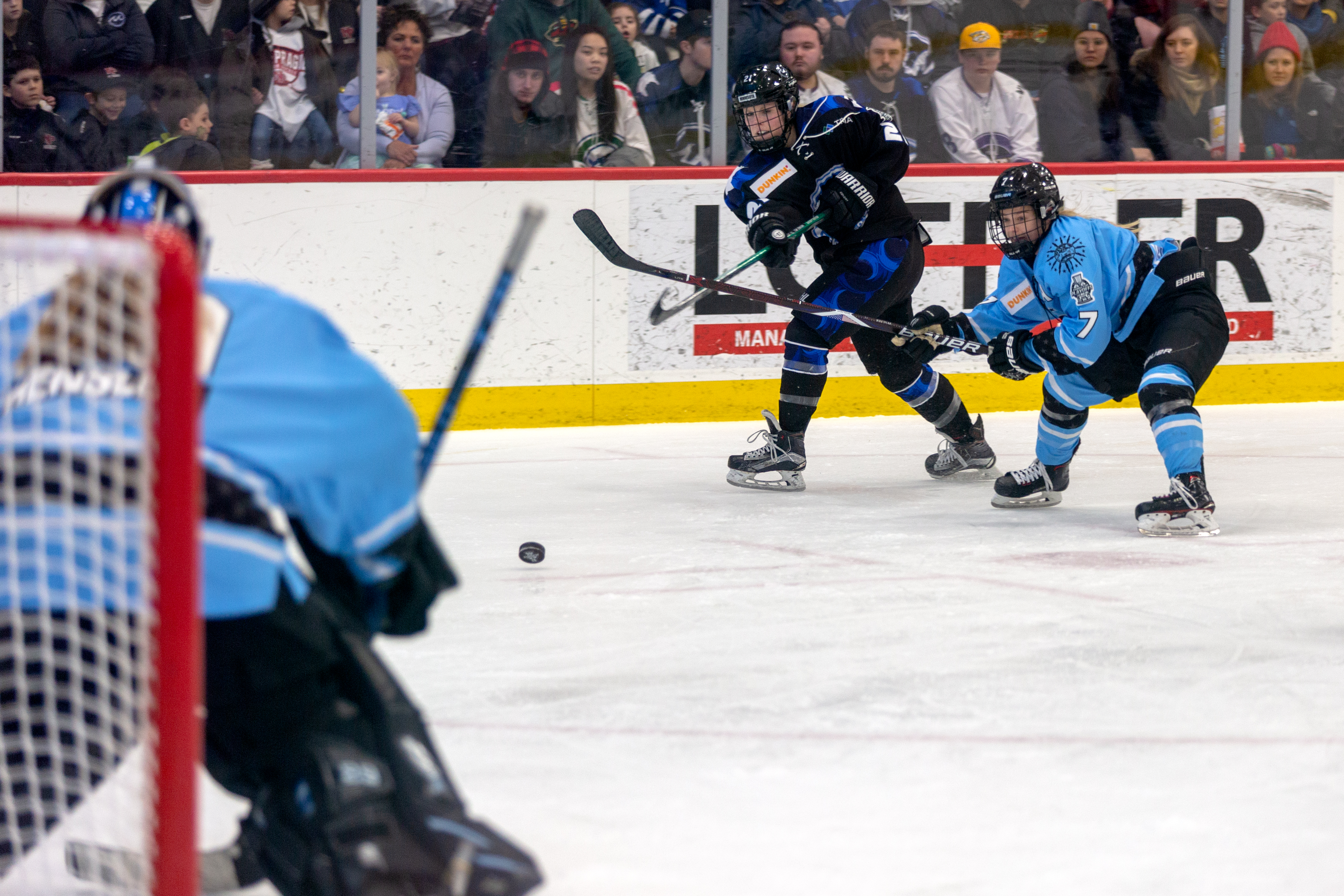
Members of the Buffalo Beauts and the Minnesota Whitecaps during the 2019 Isobel Cup championship game for the NWHL, later known as the Premier Hockey Federation.

Today, the women's game is played from youth through adult leagues, and at the university level in North America and internationally. In 2019, the Professional Women's Hockey Players Association was formed by over 150 players with the goal of creating a sustainable professional league for women's ice hockey in North America. Today, there are major professional women's hockey leagues: the Professional Women's Hockey League, with teams in the United States and Canada, and the Zhenskaya Hockey League, with teams in Russia and, previously, China.

Prior to the professionalization of women's ice hockey in the 21st century, professional women hockey players who played against men tended to be goaltenders. The United States Hockey League (USHL) welcomed the first female professional ice hockey player in 1969–70, when the Marquette Iron Rangers signed 18-year-old goaltender Karen Koch. Only one woman has ever played in the National Hockey League (NHL), goaltender Manon Rhéaume. Rhéaume played in NHL pre-season games as a goaltender for the Tampa Bay Lightning against the St. Louis Blues and the Boston Bruins. In 2003, forward Hayley Wickenheiser played with the Kirkkonummi Salamat in the Finnish men's Suomi-sarja league. Women have occasionally competed in North American minor leagues: among them Rhéaume, and fellow goaltenders Kelly Dyer and Erin Whitten. Defenceman Angela Ruggiero became the first woman to actively play in a regular season professional hockey game in North America at a position other than goalie, playing in a single game for the Tulsa Oilers of the Central Hockey League.

Between 1995 and 2005 the number of women's hockey participants increased by 400 percent. In 2011, Canada had 85,827 women players, the United States had 65,609, Finland 4,760, Sweden 3,075 and Switzerland 1,172.

Women's ice hockey was added as an Olympic medal sport eight years after the first official women's ice hockey world championship in 1990, at the 1998 Winter Olympics in Nagano, Japan.

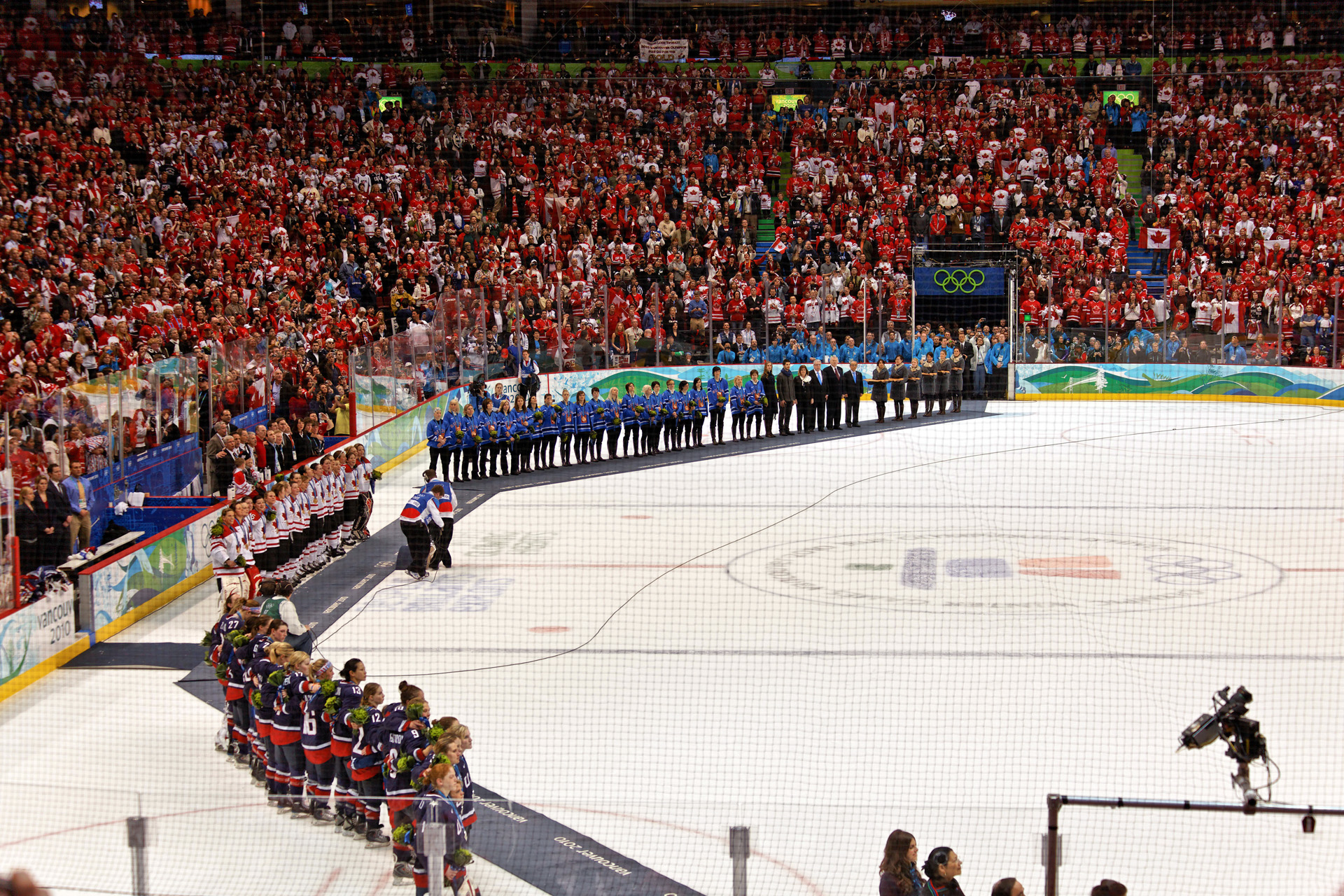
Medal ceremony for the women's ice hockey tournament at the 2010 Winter Olympics.

=== Women's World Championship ===
The 1987 World Women's Hockey Tournament in Toronto was the first international competition in women's hockey, although it was not sanctioned by the IIHF. Two years later, the 1989 IIHF European Women Championships in West Germany was the first IIHF-sanctioned event and the first European Championship held in women's hockey, preceding the IIHF-sanctioned Women's World Championship. The first world ice hockey championship for women was the 1990 IIHF Women's World Championship in Ottawa.

As of 2025, more than forty national teams participate in the annual competition, across four divisions: ten teams play in the top division and twelve teams each in Division I, Division II, and Division III. From the introduction of women's ice hockey as a medal sport in 1998, the top division tournament was not held in Olympic years until a change was approved to the IIHF Statutes & Bylaws in 2021; the 2022 top division tournament was the first to be held in an Olympic season.

=== Equipment ===
Players in women's competition are required to wear protective full-face masks. At all levels, players must wear a pelvic protector, essentially the female equivalent of a jockstrap, known colloquially as a "jill" or "jillstrap". Other protective equipment for girls and women in ice hockey is sometimes specifically designed for the female body, such as shoulder pads designed to protect a women's breast area without reducing mobility.

=== Body checking ===
Body checking has long been a divisive topic in women's hockey, and has largely been prohibited since the mid-1980s in Canada, and from there internationally. Canada's Rhonda Leeman Taylor was responsible for banning body contact from all Canadian national women's tournaments in 1983. Body checking in some of the women's hockey leagues in Canada was completely removed in 1986, which helped lead to a substantial increase in female participation in youth ice hockey in Canada.

Prior to this point, body checking had been a part of the women's game in most cases, including in Europe. It was not until after the 1990 Women's World Championship that body checking was eliminated from women's hockey internationally. In addition, until the mid-2000s, obstruction and interference were allowed, including pushing players in front of the net, minor hooking, and setting picks. When the National Hockey League removed obstruction and interference in the mid-2000s, minor hockey leagues and female leagues followed suit. In women's IIHF ice hockey today, body checking is considered an "illegal hit" and is punishable by a minor penalty, major penalty and game misconduct, or match penalty.

The idea of reintroducing body checking to the female game after its removal in the 1980s and 1990s remains controversial, though most players are in support of it. Some of those opposed to its reintroduction maintain it would lead to a loss of female participants, as once stated by Arto Sieppi, Finland's director of women's hockey. Sieppi made the statement in response to claims made by the head coach of Sweden's national women's team, Peter Elander, who had claimed its absence was due to patriarchal sexism.

Peter is a good friend of mine, but I totally disagree ... First of all, it's a women's sport, and if bodychecking would be allowed, the number of young girls entering the game would decrease rapidly.

— Mathew Sekeres, "Too Dainty to Hit?", The Globe and Mail (September 5, 2009)

The Svenska damhockeyligan (SDHL), known as the Swedish Women's Hockey League in English, announced in 2022 that it would include body checking during its 2022–23 season, but would maintain a prohibition on open-ice hits. The new program also applies to the Damettan, Sweden's second-tier women's league.

In a survey conducted in 2024 by Lund University of players in the SDHL, 88 percent of those surveyed said that they were in favour of body checking, and 64 percent said that it would not cause more injuries.

The Professional Women's Hockey League, the highest level of women's professional hockey, which debuted in 2024, also allows body checking. The PWHL rule-book outlines that body checking is permissible "when there is a clear intention of playing the puck or attempting to 'gain possession' of the puck", which is allowed principally along the boards. League executive Jayna Hefford has stated that body checking was included at the behest of players, and the league's physicality drew positive reviews when the league began play in January 2024.

As of July 2026, the NCAA is weighing a proposal that would clarify the rules around body checking in women's hockey and expand the scenarios where checking is allowed. According to the suggested revision, this is to support "more uniform rule enforcement nationally while maintaining the women’s game’s emphasis on skill, puck possession, positioning, and player safety." Because the top women's professional leagues allow body checking, this change may be to better prepare players to enter more physical leagues.

== Leagues and championships ==
The following is a list of professional ice hockey leagues by attendance:

League	Country	Notes	Average Attendance	Season
National Hockey League (NHL)	United States (25 teams); Canada (7 teams)		17,448	2024–25
National League (NL)	Switzerland		7,367	2026
Deutsche Eishockey Liga (DEL)	Germany		7,563	2026
Kontinental Hockey League (KHL)	Russia (19 teams); Belarus (1 team); China (1 team); Kazakhstan (1 team)	Successor to Russian Superleague and Soviet Championship League	7,870	2026
American Hockey League	United States (26 teams); Canada (6 teams)	Developmental league for NHL	5,920	2026
Swedish Hockey League (SHL)	Sweden	Known as Elitserien until 2013	7,047	2026
Professional Women's Hockey League	United States (7 teams); Canada (5 teams)	Founded in 2023, first game in 2024	9,304	2025–26
Czech Extraliga	Czech Republic	Formed from the split of the Czechoslovak First Ice Hockey League	5,740	2026
Liiga	Finland	Originally SM-sarja from 1928 to 1975. Known as SM-liiga since 1975	4,636	2026
Western Hockey League	Canada (17 teams); United States (5 teams)	Junior league	4,175	2024–25
ECHL	United States (25 teams); Canada (2 teams)	Developmental league for NHL	5,018	2025–26
Ontario Hockey League	Canada (17 teams); United States (3 teams)	Junior league	3,853	
NCAA Division I Men's Ice Hockey Tournament	United States	Amateur intercollegiate competition	3,281	
Quebec Maritimes Junior Hockey League	Canada	Junior league	3,271	
Champions Hockey League	Europe	Europe-wide championship tournament league. Successor to European Trophy and Champions Hockey League	3,526	2025–26
Southern Professional Hockey League	United States		3,116	
Austrian Hockey League	Austria (8 teams); Hungary (1 team); Czech Republic (1 team); Italy (1 team); Croatia (1 team)		3,164	2026
Elite Ice Hockey League	United Kingdom	Teams in all of the home nations: England, Wales, Scotland and Northern Ireland	3,815	2026
DEL2	Germany	Second division of Germany	3,716	2026
United States Hockey League	United States	Amateur junior league	2,367	
HockeyAllsvenskan	Sweden	Second division of Sweden	2,763	2026
EliteHockey Ligaen	Norway		2,114	2026
Slovak Extraliga	Slovakia (12 teams)	Formed from the split of the Czechoslovak First Ice Hockey League	2435	2026
Ligue Magnus	France		2,744	2026
Supreme Hockey League (VHL)	Russia (24 teams); Kazakhstan (2 teams); China (2 teams)	Second division of Russia and partial development league for the KHL	1,754	2026
Swiss League	Switzerland	Second division of Switzerland	1,611	2026
Chance Liga	Czech Republic	Second division of Czechia	1,518	2026
Latvian Hockey Higher League	Latvia (6 teams)		1,354	
Metal Ligaen	Denmark		1,769	2026
Asia League	Japan (4 teams); South Korea (1 teams)		1,233	2026
Mestis	Finland	Successor to I-Divisioona, Second division of Finland	1,405	2026
Federal Prospects Hockey League	United States		2,776	2025–26
Ligue Nord-Américaine de Hockey	Canada		1,131	2016
Central European Hockey League	Netherlands (10 teams); Belgium (6 teams)	Formed in 2015 with teams from Dutch Eredivisie and Belgian Hockey League. Originally BeNe League, rennamed in 2024 after 2 German teams joined	817	2026
Polska Hokej Liga	Poland		1,421	2026
Erste Liga	Hungary (6 teams); Romania (2 teams); Austria (1 team)		822	2026
Alps Hockey League	Austria (7 teams); Italy (8 teams); Slovenia (2 teams)	Formed in 2016 with the merger of Italy's Serie A and the joint Austrian–Slovenian Inter-National League	803	2026
Belarusian Extraleague	Belarus		1,091	2026
Swedish Women's Hockey League	Sweden	Formed in 2007 and known as Riksserien until 2016	426	2024–25

=== Club competition ===
==== North America ====
The NHL is the best attended and most popular ice hockey league in the world, and is among the major professional sports leagues in the United States and Canada. The league's history began after Canada's National Hockey Association decided to disband in 1917; the result was the creation of the National Hockey League with four teams. The league expanded to the United States beginning in 1924 and had as many as 10 teams before contracting to six teams—known today as the Original Six—by 1942–43. In 1967, the NHL doubled in size to 12 teams, undertaking one of the greatest expansions in professional sports history. A few years later, in 1972, a new 12-team league, the World Hockey Association (WHA), was formed and its ensuing rivalry with the NHL caused a rapid escalation in players' salaries. In 1979, the 17-team NHL merged with the WHA creating a 21-team league. By 2017, the NHL had expanded to 31 teams, and after a realignment in 2013, these teams were divided into two conferences and four divisions. The league expanded to 32 teams in 2021.

The American Hockey League (AHL) is the primary developmental professional league for players aspiring to enter the NHL. It comprises 31 teams from the United States and Canada. It is run as a farm league to the NHL, with the vast majority of AHL players under contract to an NHL team. The ECHL (called the East Coast Hockey League before the 2003–04 season) is a mid-level minor league in the United States with a few players under contract to NHL or AHL teams.

As of 2019, there are three minor professional leagues with no NHL affiliations: the Federal Prospects Hockey League (FPHL), Ligue Nord-Américaine de Hockey (LNAH), and the Southern Professional Hockey League (SPHL).

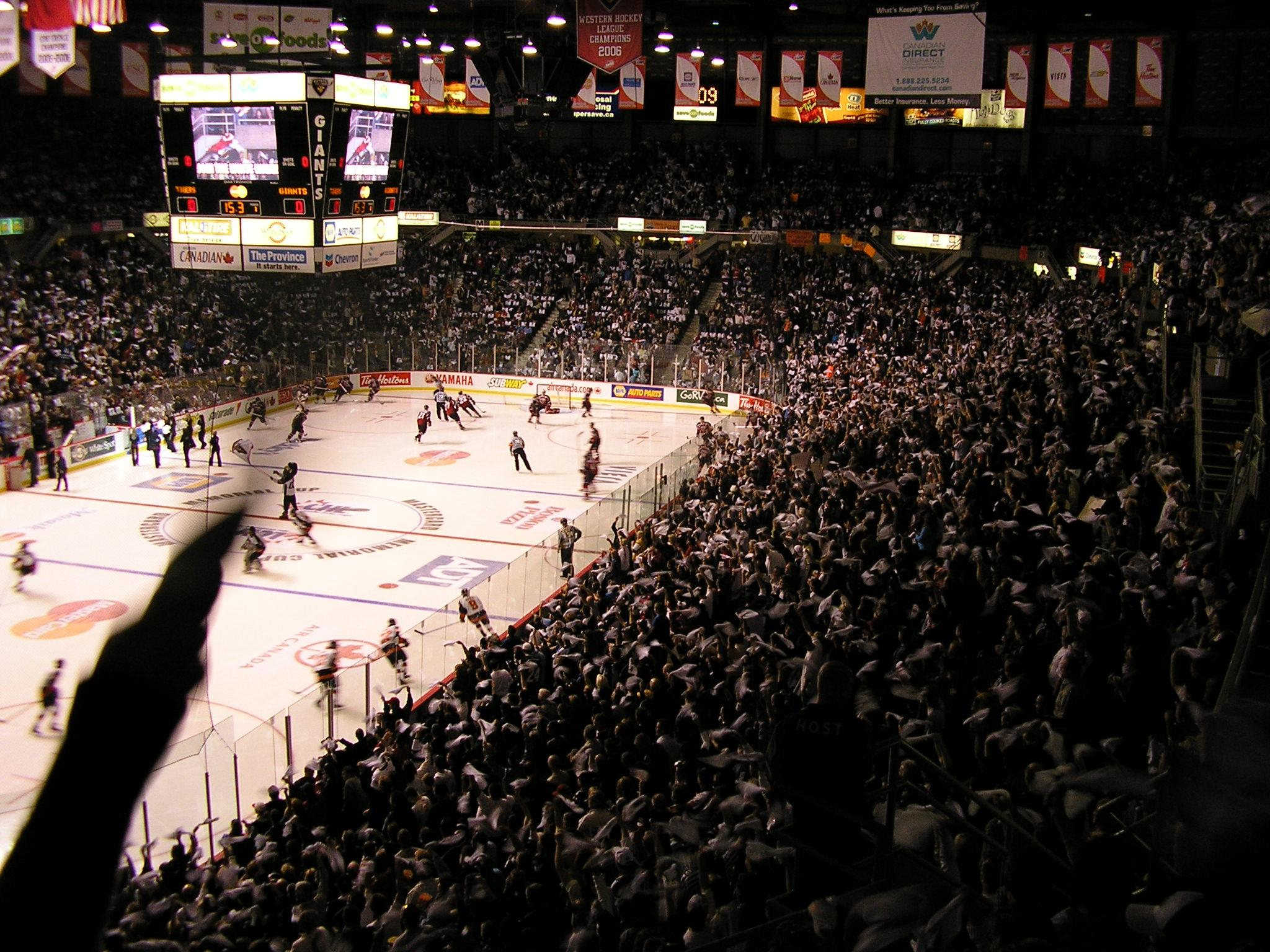
Pre-game warmups prior to a Memorial Cup game. The tourney serves as the championship for the major junior Canadian Hockey League.

U Sports ice hockey is the highest level of play at the Canadian university level under the auspices of U Sports, Canada's governing body for university sports. As these players compete at the university level, they are obligated to follow the rule of standard eligibility of five years. In the United States especially, college hockey is popular and the best university teams compete in the annual NCAA Men's Ice Hockey Championship. The American Collegiate Hockey Association is composed of college teams at the club level.

In Canada, the Canadian Hockey League is an umbrella organization comprising three major junior leagues: the Ontario Hockey League, the Western Hockey League, and the Quebec Maritimes Junior Hockey League. It attracts players from Canada, the United States, and Europe. The major junior players are considered amateurs as they are under 21-years-old and not paid a salary, rather a stipend, and play a schedule similar to a professional league. Typically, the NHL drafts many players directly from the major junior leagues. In the United States, the United States Hockey League (USHL) is the highest junior league. Players in this league are also amateur with players required to be under 21-years old, but do not get a stipend, which allows players to retain their eligibility for participation in NCAA ice hockey.

The Professional Women's Hockey League is the highest level of club competition in women's hockey. It was founded in 2023 and debuted in 2024 with three teams in Canada and three in the United States, and added one team in each country in 2025.

==== Eurasia ====
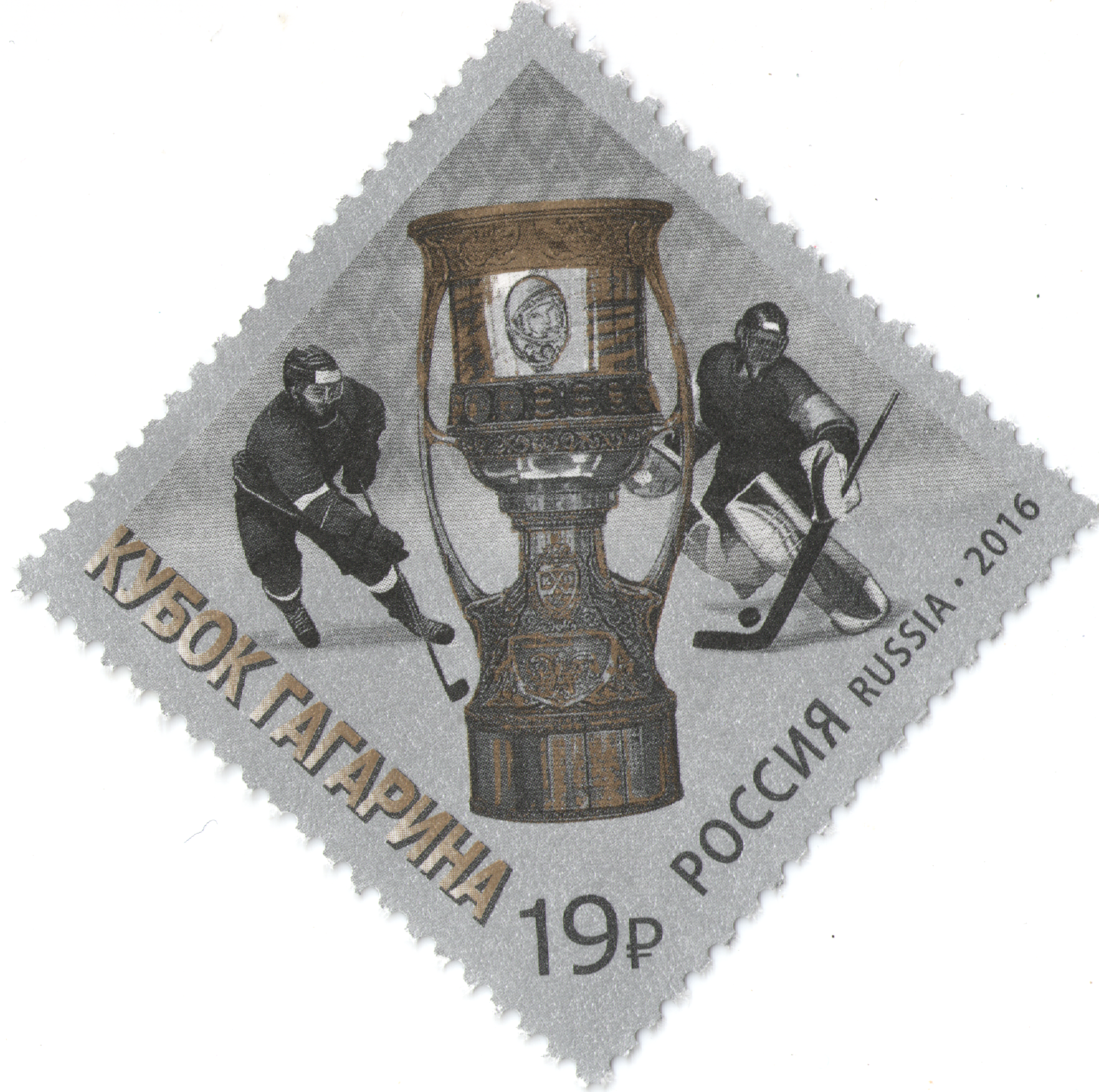
A Russian stamp commemorating the Gagarin Cup, which is presented to the KHL's playoff champion. The KHL is the largest ice hockey league in Eurasia.

The Kontinental Hockey League (KHL) is the largest and most popular ice hockey league in Eurasia. The league is the direct successor to the Russian Super League, which in turn was the successor to the Soviet League, the history of which dates back to the Soviet adoption of ice hockey in the 1940s. The KHL was launched in 2008 with clubs predominantly from Russia, but featuring teams from other post-Soviet states. The league expanded beyond the former Soviet countries beginning in the 2011–12 season, with clubs in Croatia and Slovakia. The KHL currently comprises member clubs based in Belarus (1), China (1), Kazakhstan (1) and Russia (19) for a total of 22.

The second division of hockey in Eurasia is the Supreme Hockey League (VHL). This league features 24 teams from Russia and 2 from Kazakhstan. This league is currently being converted to a farm league for the KHL, similarly to the AHL's function in relation to the NHL. The third division is the Russian Hockey League, which features only teams from Russia. The Asia League, an international ice hockey league featuring clubs from China, Japan, South Korea, and the Russian Far East, is the successor to the Japan Ice Hockey League.

The highest junior league in Eurasia is the Junior Hockey League (MHL). It features 32 teams from post-Soviet states, predominantly Russia. The second tier to this league is the Junior Hockey League Championships (MHL-B).

==== Europe ====
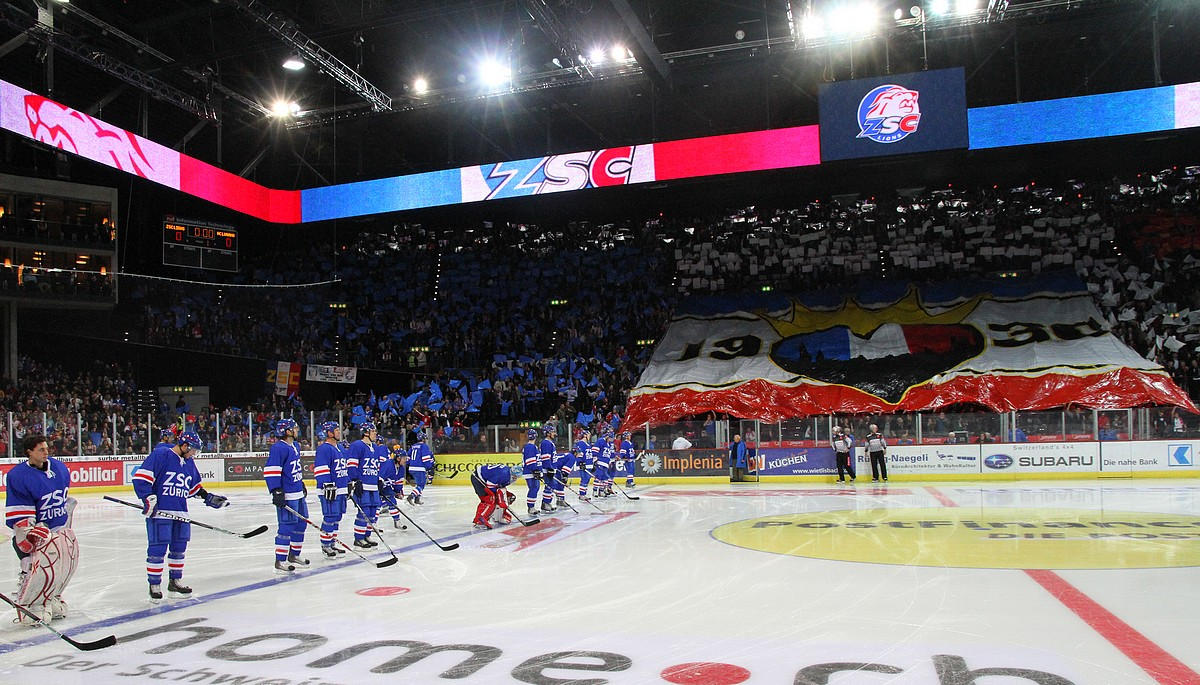
Players from the ZSC Lions line up prior to a game. The club plays in the Swiss National League A.

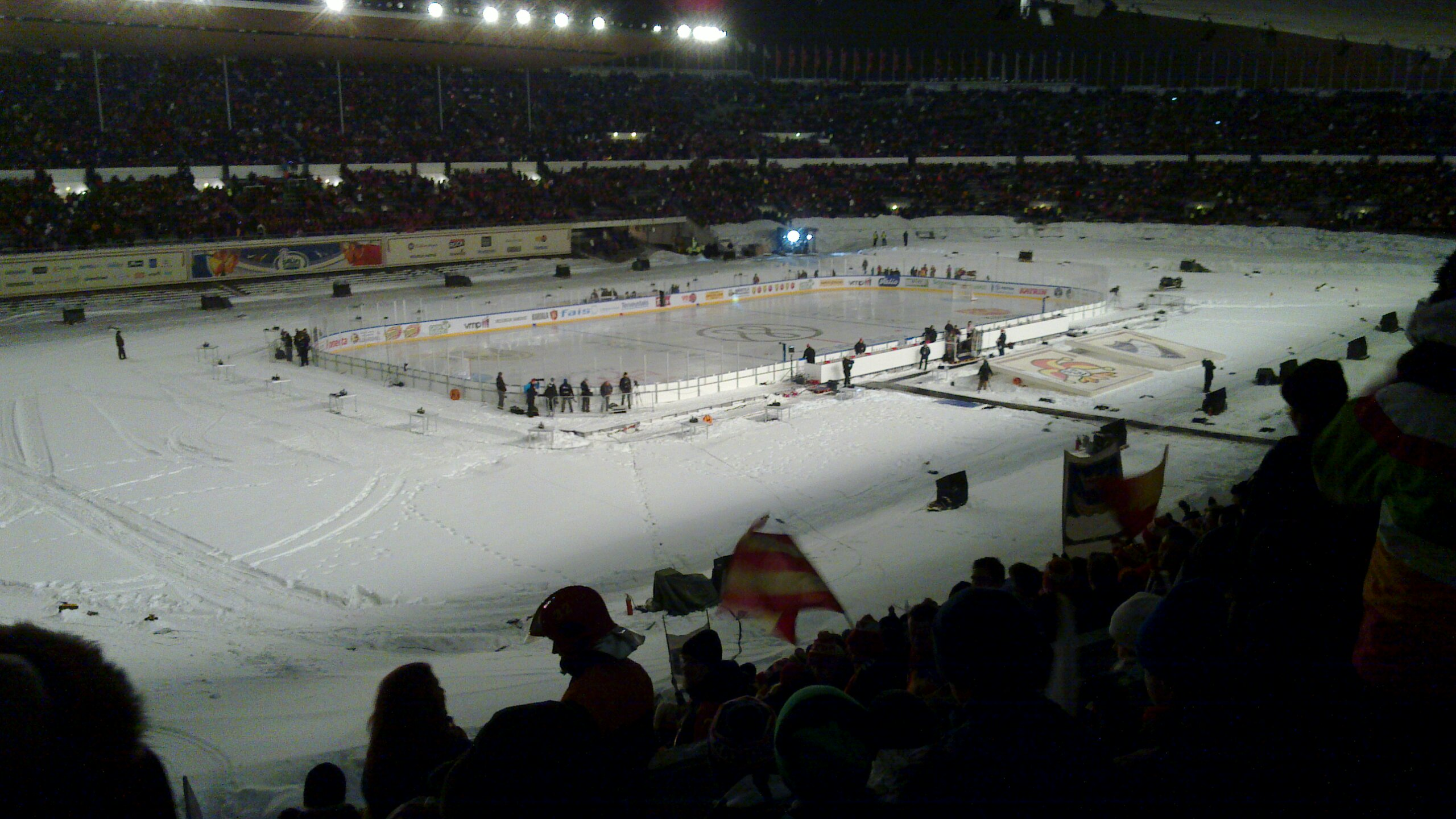
Finnish clubs Jokerit and HIFK during a 2011 outside game at the Helsinki Olympic Stadium.

Several countries in Europe have their own top professional senior leagues. Many future KHL and NHL players start or end their professional careers in these leagues. The National League A in Switzerland, Swedish Hockey League in Sweden, SM-liiga in Finland, and Czech Extraliga in the Czech Republic are all very popular in their respective countries.

Beginning in the 2014–15 season, the Champions Hockey League was launched, a league consisting of first-tier teams from several European countries, running parallel to the teams' domestic leagues. The competition is meant to serve as a Europe-wide ice hockey club championship. The competition is a direct successor to the European Trophy and is related to the 2008–09 tournament of the same name.

There are also several annual tournaments for clubs, held outside of league play. Pre-season tournaments include the European Trophy, Tampere Cup and the Pajulahti Cup. One of the oldest international ice hockey competition for clubs is the Spengler Cup, held every year in Davos, Switzerland, between Christmas and New Year's Day. It was first awarded in 1923 to the Oxford University Ice Hockey Club. The Memorial Cup, a competition for junior-level (age 20 and under) clubs is held annually from a pool of junior championship teams in Canada and the United States.

International club competitions organized by the IIHF include the Continental Cup, the Victoria Cup and the European Women's Champions Cup. The World Junior Club Cup is an annual tournament of junior ice hockey clubs representing each of the top junior leagues.

==== Other regions ====
The Australian Ice Hockey League and New Zealand Ice Hockey League are represented by nine and five teams respectively. As of 2012, the two top teams of the previous season from each league compete in the Trans-Tasman Champions League.

Ice hockey in Africa is a small but growing sport; while no African ice hockey playing nation has a domestic national league, there are several regional leagues in South Africa.

=== National team competitions ===
Pictogram used to identify ice hockey at the Winter Olympic Games

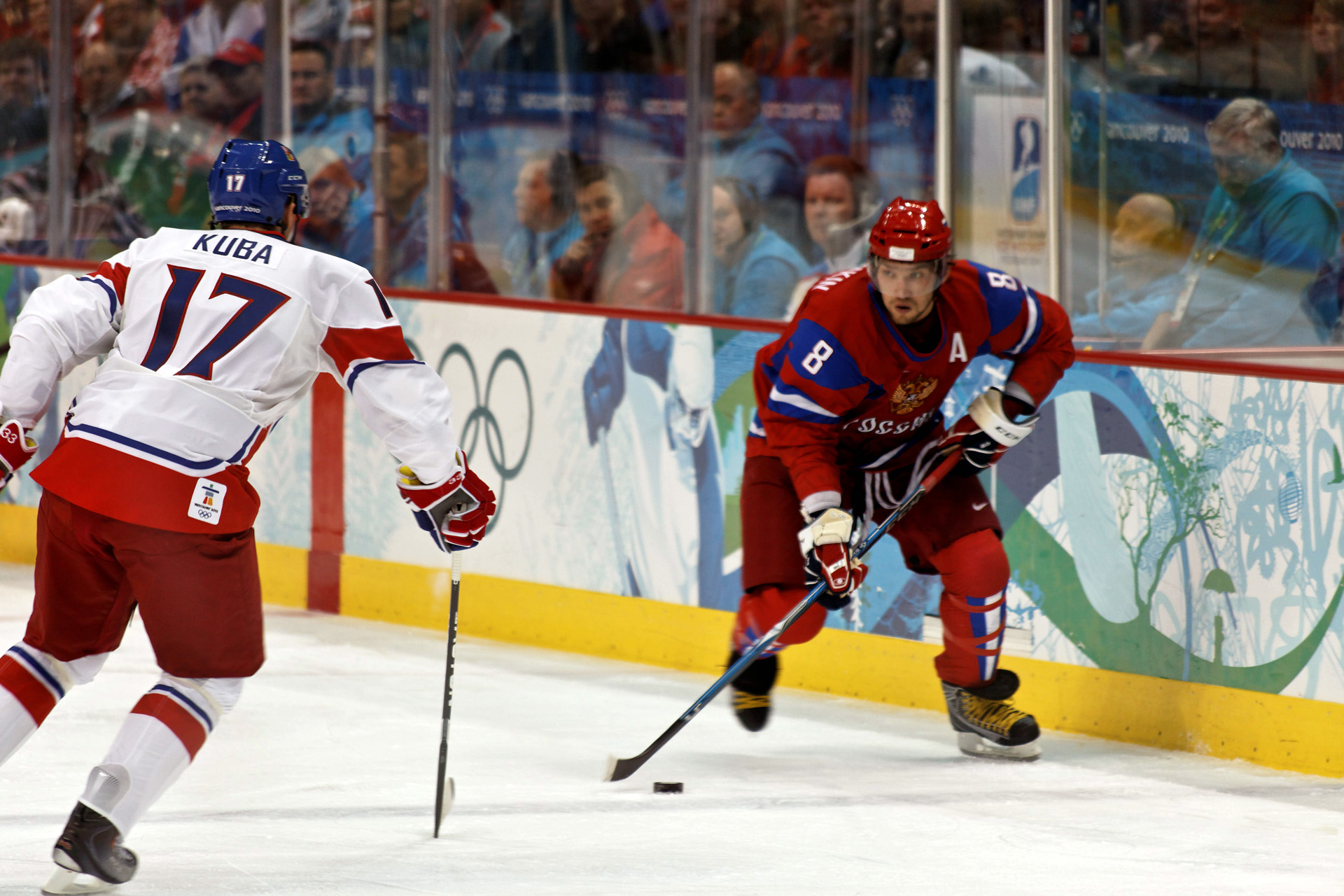
Alexander Ovechkin of the Russian men's hockey team moves the puck as Czech Republic's Filip Kuba defends against him, during the 2010 Olympics.

Ice hockey has been played at the Winter Olympics since 1924 (and was played at the summer games in 1920). Hockey is Canada's national winter sport, and Canadians are extremely passionate about the game. The nation has traditionally done very well at the Olympic Games, winning six of the first seven gold medals. By 1956, its amateur club teams and national teams could not compete with the teams of government-supported players from the Soviet Union. The USSR won all but two gold medals from 1956 to 1988. The United States won its first gold medal in 1960. On the way to winning the gold medal at the 1980 Lake Placid Olympics, amateur US college players defeated the heavily favoured Soviet squad—an event known as the "Miracle on Ice" in the United States. Restrictions on professional players were fully dropped at the 1988 games in Calgary. NHL agreed to participate ten years later. The 1998 Games saw the full participation of players from the NHL, which suspended operations during the Games and has done so in subsequent Games up until 2018. The 2010 games in Vancouver were the first played in an NHL city since the inclusion of NHL players. The 2010 games were the first played on NHL-sized ice rinks, which are narrower than the IIHF standard.

National teams representing the member federations of the IIHF compete annually in the IIHF Ice Hockey World Championships. Teams are selected from the available players by the individual federations, without restriction on amateur or professional status. Since it is held in the spring, the tournament coincides with the annual NHL Stanley Cup playoffs and many of the top players are hence not available to participate in the tournament. Many of the NHL players who do play in the IIHF tournament come from teams eliminated before the playoffs or in the first round, and federations often hold open spots until the tournament to allow for players to join the tournament after their club team is eliminated. For many years, the tournament was an amateur-only tournament, but this restriction was removed, beginning in 1977.

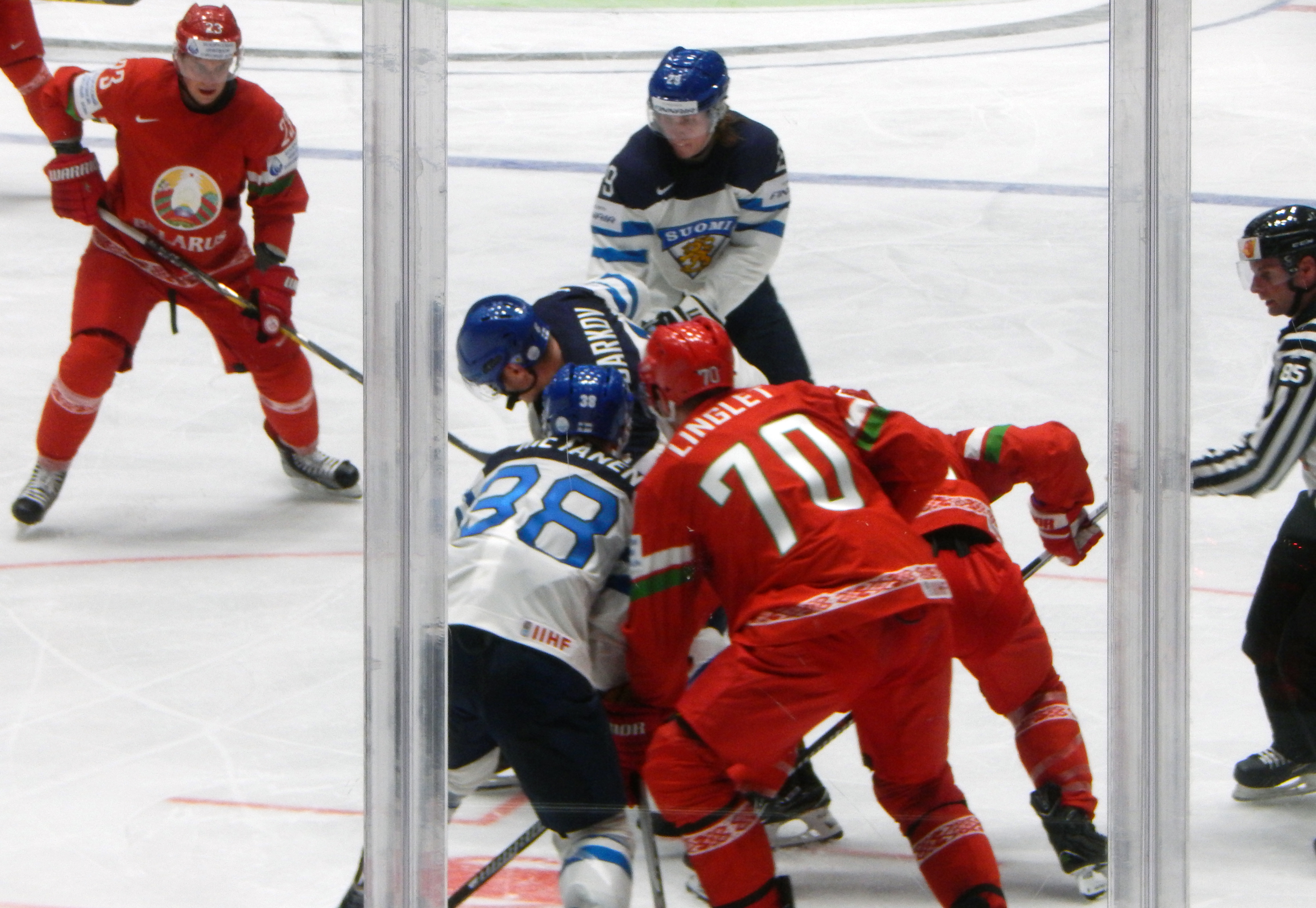
Skaters from the Finnish and Belarusian men's ice hockey teams shortly after a face-off during the 2016 IIHF World Championship. The IIHF is an annual national team tournament.

The 1972 Summit Series and 1974 Summit Series, two series pitting the best Canadian and Soviet players without IIHF restrictions were major successes, and established a rivalry between Canada and the USSR. In the spirit of best-versus-best without restrictions on amateur or professional status, the series were followed by five Canada Cup tournaments, played in North America. Two NHL versus USSR series were also held: the 1979 Challenge Cup and Rendez-vous '87. The Canada Cup tournament later became the World Cup of Hockey, played in 1996, 2004 and 2016. The United States won in 1996 and Canada won in 2004 and 2016.

Since the initial women's world championships in 1990, there have been fifteen tournaments. Women's hockey has been played at the Olympics since 1998. The only finals in the women's world championship or Olympics that did not involve both Canada and the United States were the 2006 Winter Olympic final between Canada and Sweden and 2019 World Championship final between the US and Finland.

Other ice hockey tournaments featuring national teams include the World Junior Championship, the World U18 Championships, the World U-17 Hockey Challenge, the World Junior A Challenge, the Ivan Hlinka Memorial Tournament, the World Women's U18 Championships and the 4 Nations Cup. The annual Euro Hockey Tour, an unofficial European championship between the national men's teams of the Czech Republic, Finland, Russia and Sweden have been played since 1996–97.

=== Attendance records ===
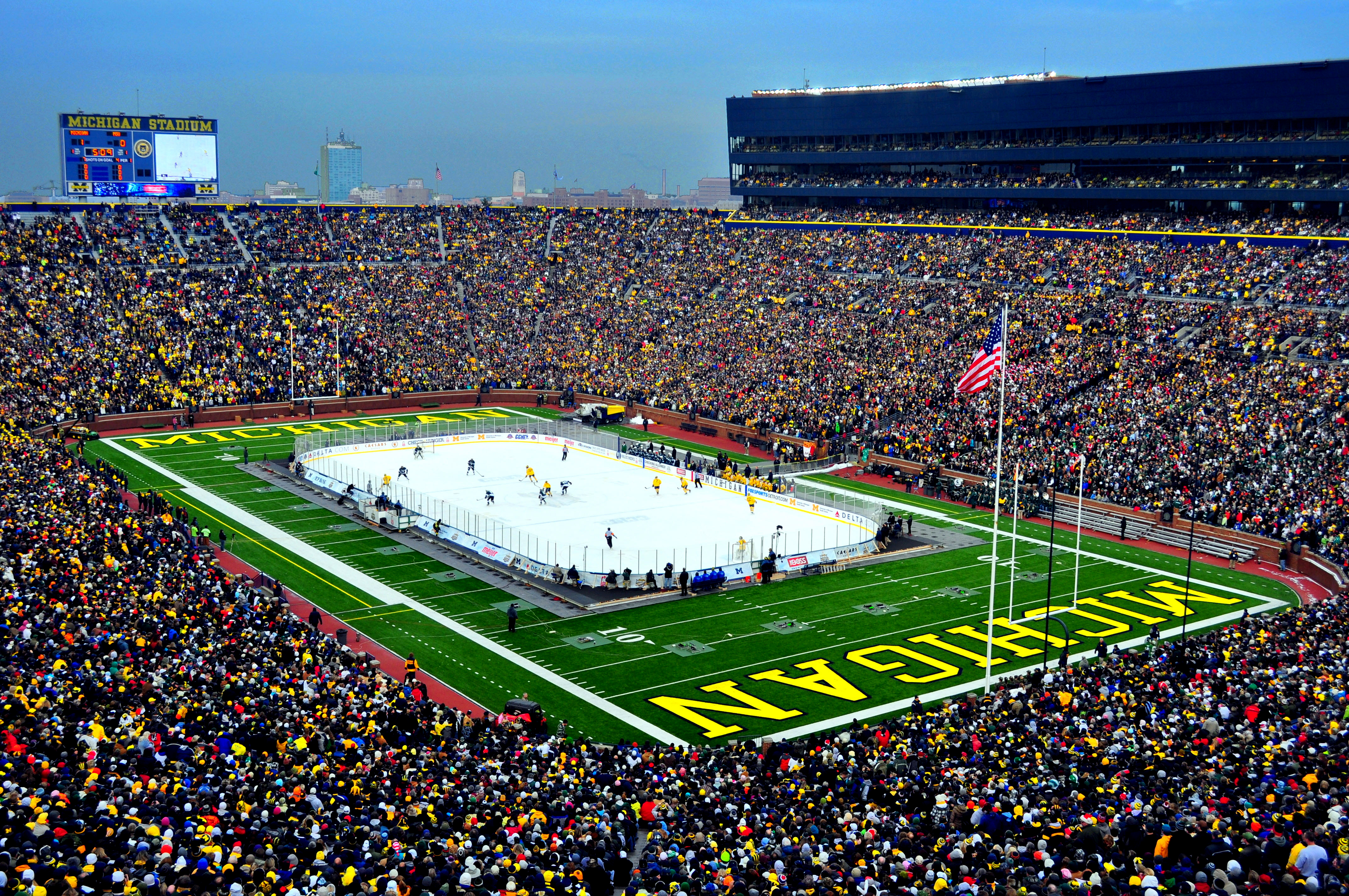
The Big Chill at the Big House was a collegiate ice hockey game played at Michigan Stadium in 2010. The game set the attendance record for ice hockey games.

The attendance record for an ice hockey game was set on December 11, 2010, when the University of Michigan's men's ice hockey team faced cross-state rival Michigan State in an event billed as "The Big Chill at the Big House". The game was played at Michigan's (American) football venue, Michigan Stadium in Ann Arbor, with a capacity of 109,901 as of the 2010 football season. When UM stopped sales to the public on May 6, 2010, with plans to reserve remaining tickets for students, over 100,000 tickets had been sold for the event. Ultimately, a crowd announced by UM as 113,411, the largest in the stadium's history (including football), saw the homestanding Wolverines win 5–0. Guinness World Records, using a count of ticketed fans who actually entered the stadium instead of UM's figure of tickets sold, announced a final figure of 104,173.

The record was approached but not broken at the 2014 NHL Winter Classic, which also held at Michigan Stadium, with the Detroit Red Wings as the home team and the Toronto Maple Leafs as the opposing team with an announced crowd of 105,491. The record for an NHL Stanley Cup playoff game is 28,183, set on April 23, 1996, at the Thunderdome during a Tampa Bay Lightning – Philadelphia Flyers game.

The attendance record for a professional women's game was set on April 20, 2024 when a sold-out crowd of 21,105 people at the Bell Centre in Montreal watched a PWHL game between Montreal and Toronto.

== International status ==
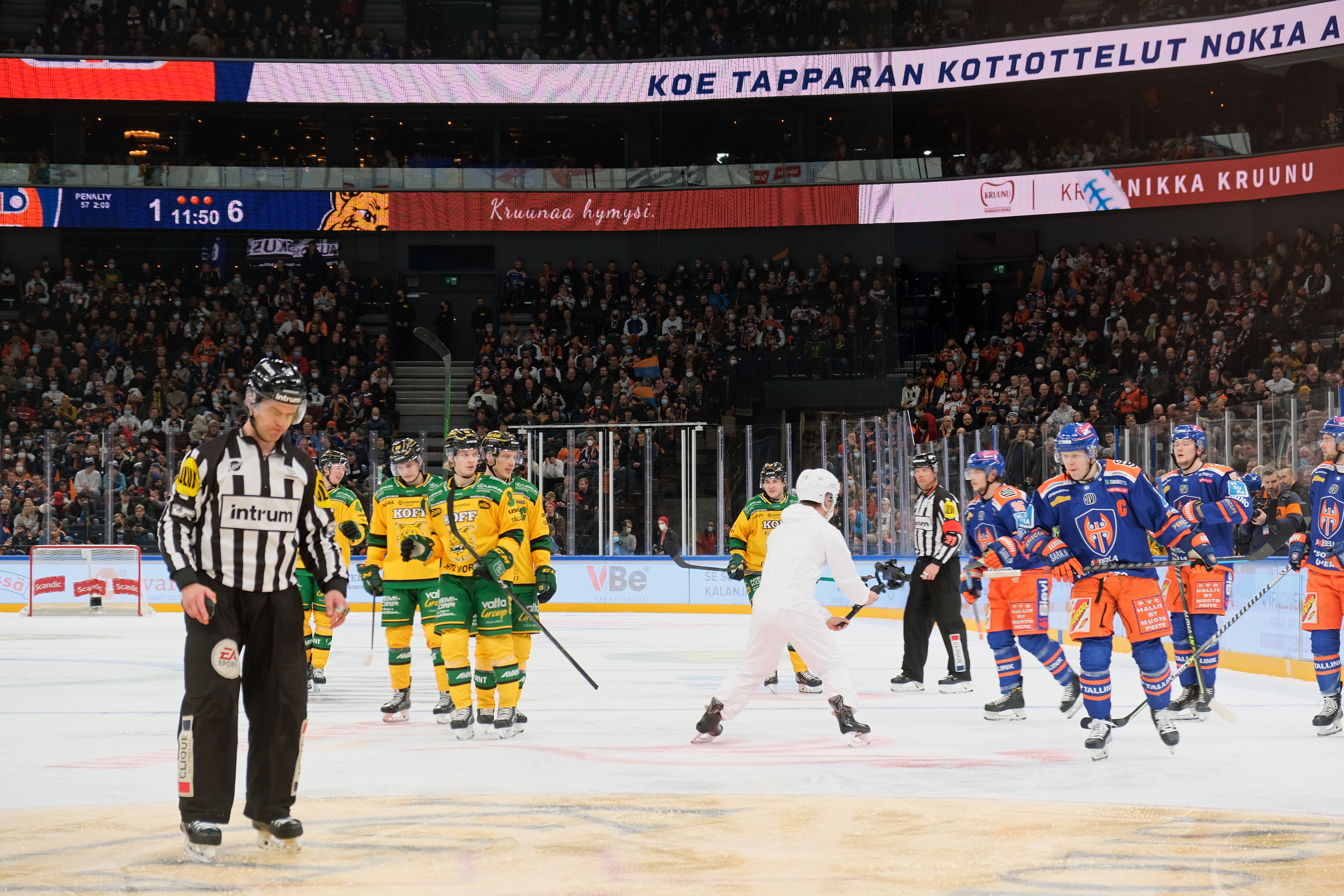
The match between rival teams Ilves (yellow and green) and Tappara (blue and orange) on December 3, 2021, at Nokia Arena in Tampere, Finland.

Ice hockey is most popular in Canada, Germany, Austria, Switzerland, Finland, Eastern Europe, Northern Europe, and the United States. Ice hockey is the official national winter sport of Canada.

In addition, ice hockey is the most popular winter sport in Austria, Belarus, the Czech Republic, Germany, Latvia, Norway, Russia, Slovakia, Sweden, and Switzerland. North America's National Hockey League (NHL) is the highest level for men's ice hockey and the strongest professional ice hockey league in the world. The Kontinental Hockey League (KHL) is the highest league in Russia and much of Eastern Europe.

The International Ice Hockey Federation (IIHF) is the formal governing body for international ice hockey, with the IIHF managing international tournaments and maintaining the IIHF World Ranking. Worldwide, the International Ice Hockey Federation has 83 member national associations, comprising 60 full members, 22 associate members, and one affiliate member.

In international competitions, the national teams of six countries (the Big Six) predominate: Canada, Czechia, Finland, Russia, Sweden, and the United States. Of the 69 medals awarded all-time in men's competition at the Olympics, only seven medals were not awarded to one of those countries (or two of their precursors: the Soviet Union for Russia, and Czechoslovakia for Czechia). In the annual Ice Hockey World Championships, 177 of 201 medals have been awarded to the six nations; Canada has won the most gold medals. Teams outside the Big Six have won only nine medals in either competition since 1953.

The World Cup of Hockey is organized by the National Hockey League and the National Hockey League Players' Association (NHLPA), unlike the annual World Championships and quadrennial Olympic tournament, both run by the International Ice Hockey Federation. World Cup games are played under NHL rules and not those of the IIHF, and the tournament occurs prior to the NHL pre-season, allowing for all NHL players to be available, unlike the World Championships, which overlaps with the NHL's Stanley Cup playoffs. Furthermore, all twelve Women's Olympic and 36 IIHF Women's World Championship medals were awarded to one of the Big Six. The Canadian national team or the United States national team have between them won every gold medal of either series.

=== Number of registered players by country ===
Number of registered hockey players, including male, female and junior, provided by the respective countries' federations. This list only includes the 39 of 84 IIHF member countries with more than 1,000 registered players as of March 2025.

Country	Players	% of population
Canada	587,680	1.479%
United States	566,477	0.164%
Russia	90,160	0.062%
Sweden	76,841	0.724%
Finland	66,078	1.176%
Switzerland	31,273	0.351%
Czechia	27,141	0.253%
Germany	26,517	0.031%
France	23,560	0.035%
Japan	13,842	0.011%
Norway	12,415	0.223%
Great Britain	12,236	0.018%
Slovakia	11,728	0.213%
China	10,786	0.001%
Belarus	10,335	0.114%
Hungary	8,569	0.089%
Latvia	7,864	0.420%
Austria	7,576	0.083%
Denmark	6,110	0.102%
Ukraine	5,341	0.014%
Australia	5,270	0.020%
Kazakhstan	4,931	0.024%
Italy	4,901	0.008%
Poland	4,003	0.010%
South Korea	3,587	0.007%
Netherlands	3,088	0.017%
Belgium	2,947	0.025%
India	2,554	0.000%
New Zealand	2,446	0.047%
Kyrgyzstan	2,134	0.030%
Romania	1,719	0.009%
Turkey	1,642	0.002%
Lithuania	1,576	0.055%
North Korea	1,510	0.006%
Mexico	1,391	0.001%
Slovenia	1,243	0.059%
Argentina	1,137	0.002%
Bulgaria	1,054	0.016%
Estonia	1,024	0.075%

== Variants ==
=== Pond hockey ===
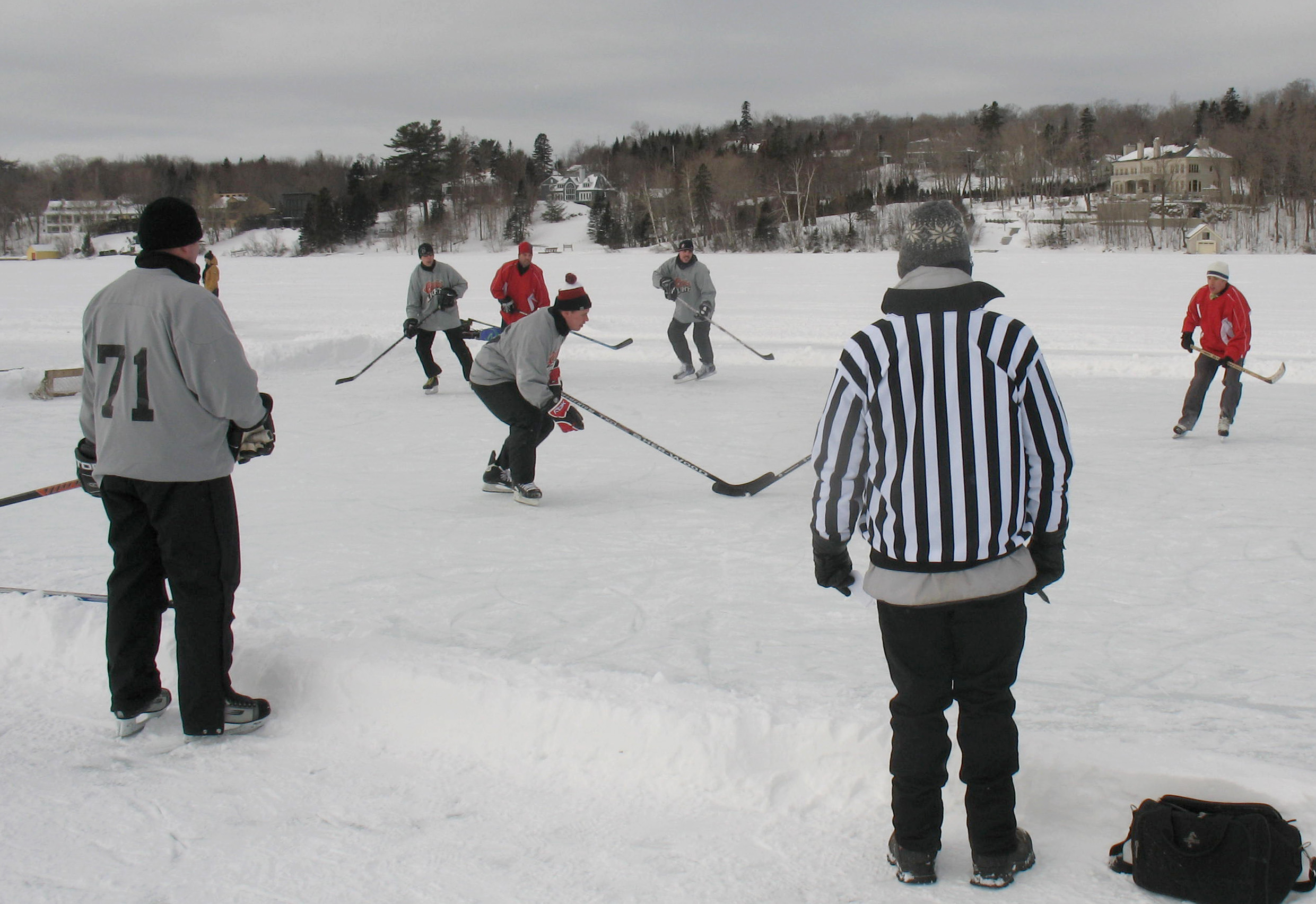
A game of pond hockey being played in Lac-Beauport, Quebec

Pond hockey is a form of ice hockey played generally as pick-up hockey on lakes, ponds and artificial outdoor rinks during the winter. Pond hockey is commonly referred to in hockey circles as shinny. Its rules differ from traditional hockey because there is no hitting and very little shooting, placing a greater emphasis on skating, stickhandling and passing abilities. Since 2002, the World Pond Hockey Championship has been played on Roulston Lake in Tobique Valley, New Brunswick, Canada. Since 2006, the US Pond Hockey Championships have been played in Minneapolis, Minnesota, and the Canadian National Pond Hockey Championships have been played in Huntsville, Ontario.

=== Sledge hockey ===
Sledge hockey is an adaptation of ice hockey designed for players who have a physical disability. Players are seated in sleds and use a specialized hockey stick that also helps the player navigate on the ice. The sport was created in Sweden in the early 1960s and is played under similar rules to ice hockey.

== In popular culture ==
Ice hockey is the official winter sport of Canada. Ice hockey, partially because of its popularity as a major professional sport, has been a source of inspiration for numerous films, television episodes and songs in Canadian and American popular culture.

== See also ==
- Analytics (ice hockey)
- Black players in ice hockey
- College ice hockey
- Glossary of ice hockey
- Ice hockey by country
- List of films about ice hockey
- Minor ice hockey
- LGBTQ people in ice hockey
- Transgender people in ice hockey
