= Lace bite =

Sports injury

Lace bite is an irritation of the tibialis anterior and toe extensor tendons. The medical term for the condition is "tibialis anterior tendinopathy." This irritation, felt on the front of the foot or ankle, is often experienced by ice hockey players and figure skaters. It is caused by friction between the tendon and tongue of the ice skate.

== Signs and symptoms ==
Common symptoms of lace bite include:

- Pain, tenderness, and swelling where the front of the ankle meets the foot
- Discomfort with ankle motion, especially when pulling the foot up or turning it inward
- A cracking sound when the front of the foot or ankle is moved or touched

== Treatment ==
Prevention and treatment options for lace bite include:

- Tying the skate's laces outside-in instead of inside-out
- Adjusting the skate's tongue position
- Using a gel pad that covers the irritated section of the foot and ankle
- Icing the foot and ankle after skating

Purpose-built socks also exist specifically for use with ice skates which contain padded areas around the typical friction points.

== See also ==
- Sports injury
- Ice hockey
- Ice skating
