= 2-1-2 forecheck =

The 2-1-2 forecheck, or pinch on a wide rim is an ice hockey forechecking strategy which uses two forwards deep in the offensive zone, with the remaining forward positioned high in the offensive zone, and the two defencemen positioned at the highest part of the zone near the blue line. This forecheck is used to apply both mental and physical pressure on the opposing team as they try to move the puck out of their defensive zone with objective of forcing a turnover. The positioning of the players removes options for moving the puck along the boards, forcing the play to the middle.

Each of the five skaters has a specific role in the execution of the 2-1-2 forecheck.

1. The primary forward (F1) must enter the zone with speed and make contact with the puck carrier. Whether the defenceman has the puck in the corner or in the open ice F1 must check the player and try to separate the puck from the defenceman.
2. Once the puck is separated from the defencemen it is up to the secondary forward (F2) to get the puck. F2 must read the situation and react appropriately. If F1 is giving chase to the defenceman then F2 must get into the passing lanes of the defenceman until F1 can make a body-check on the defenceman to separate the puck. Once the puck is separated F2 must skate quickly to retrieve the puck.
3. The third forward (F3) is the third man into the zone and stays higher in the zone to be ready for a pass from F2. F1 and F2 are deep into the zone and are the first "2" in the 2-1-2 forecheck. F3 is the "1" since he is alone in the high part of the zone. F3 must stay on the side of the puck, known as the strong side, to be positioned and ready for a pass from F2.
4. The fourth skater into the offensive zone is a defenceman (D1). This defenceman will be high in the zone unless possession of the puck is lost and shot around the boards. If this happens then D1's responsibility is to skate hard towards the puck and get it back to F1 or F2. This is known as "pinching the wide rim."
5. The fifth skater into the zone is the remaining defenceman (D2). D2 also stays high in the zone. He will be supporting the side without the puck, known as the weak side. If the puck is sent to the other side then D2 will pinch the rim to get it back to F1 or F2. Then, D1 will cover the high point of the weak side. D1 and D2 are the second "2" in the 2-1-2 forecheck.

This system of forechecking requires good skaters in order to be successful. The Edmonton Oilers during their dynasty years were such a club and made use of the 2-1-2 forecheck.
