= History of ice hockey =

Ice hockey is believed to have evolved from simple stick and ball games played in the 18th and 19th centuries in Britain, Ireland, and elsewhere, primarily bandy, hurling, and shinty. The North American sport of lacrosse was also influential. These games were brought to North America and several similar winter games using informal rules developed, such as shinny and ice polo, but were later absorbed into a new organized game with codified rules which today is ice hockey.

== Name ==
In England, field hockey has historically been called simply hockey and was referenced as such when first appearing in print. The first known mention of hockey occurred in the 1772 book Juvenile Sports and Pastimes, to Which Are Prefixed, Memoirs of the Author: Including a New Mode of Infant Education, by Richard Johnson (Pseud. Master Michel Angelo), whose chapter XI was titled "New Improvements on the Game of Hockey". The 1527 Statute of Galway banned a sport called "'hokie'—the hurling of a little ball with sticks or staves". A form of this word was thus being used in the 16th century, though much removed from its current usage.

The belief that hockey was mentioned in a 1363 proclamation by King Edward III of England is based on modern translations of the proclamation, which was originally in Latin and explicitly forbade the games Pilam Manualem, Pedivam, & Bacularem: & ad Canibucam & Gallorum Pugnam.

According to the Austin Hockey Association, the word puck derives from the Scottish Gaelic puc or the Irish poc ('to poke, punch or deliver a blow'). "...The blow given by a hurler to the ball with his camán or hurley is always called a puck."

== Precursors ==
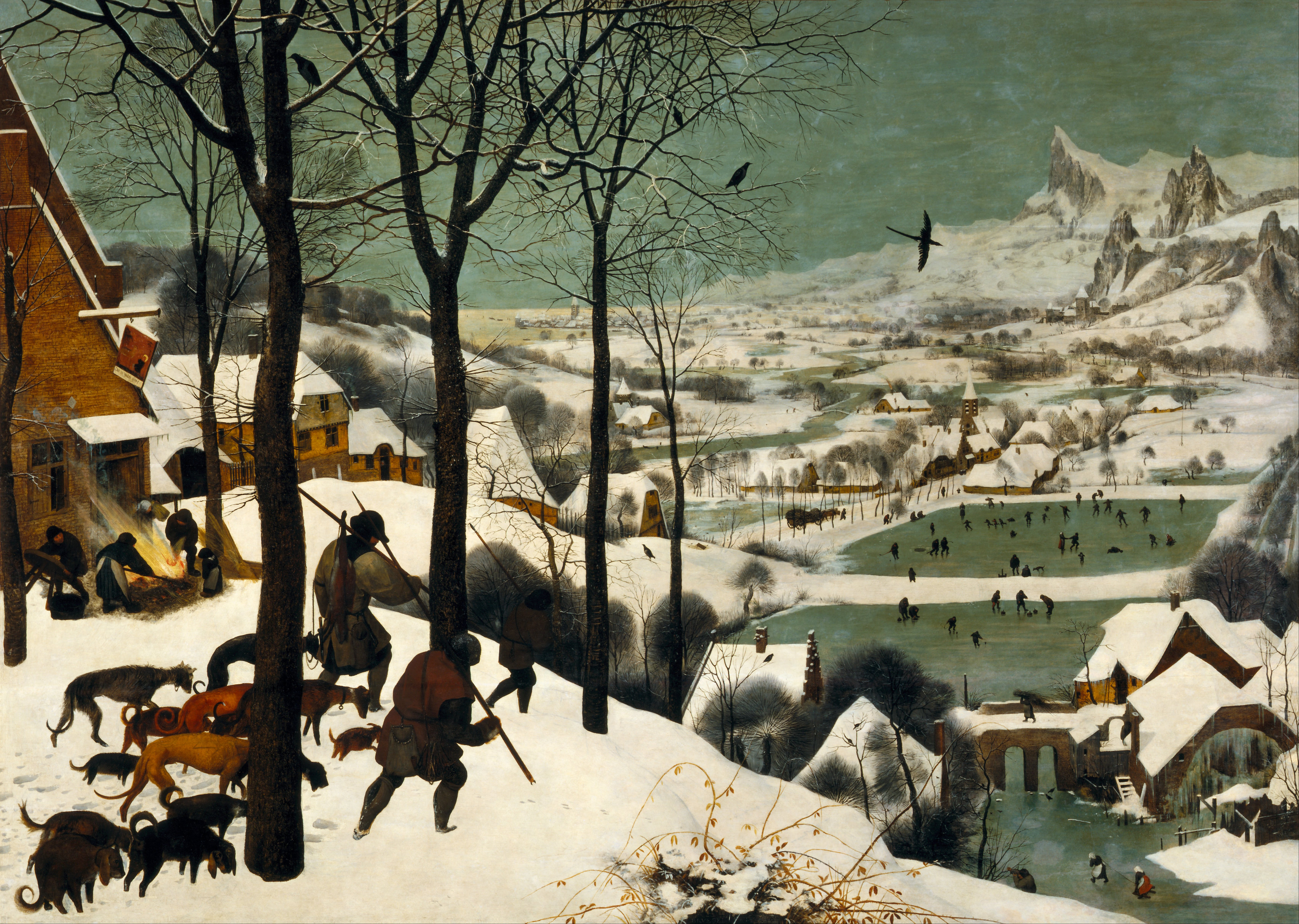
An oil-on-wood painting by Pieter Bruegel the Elder from 1565

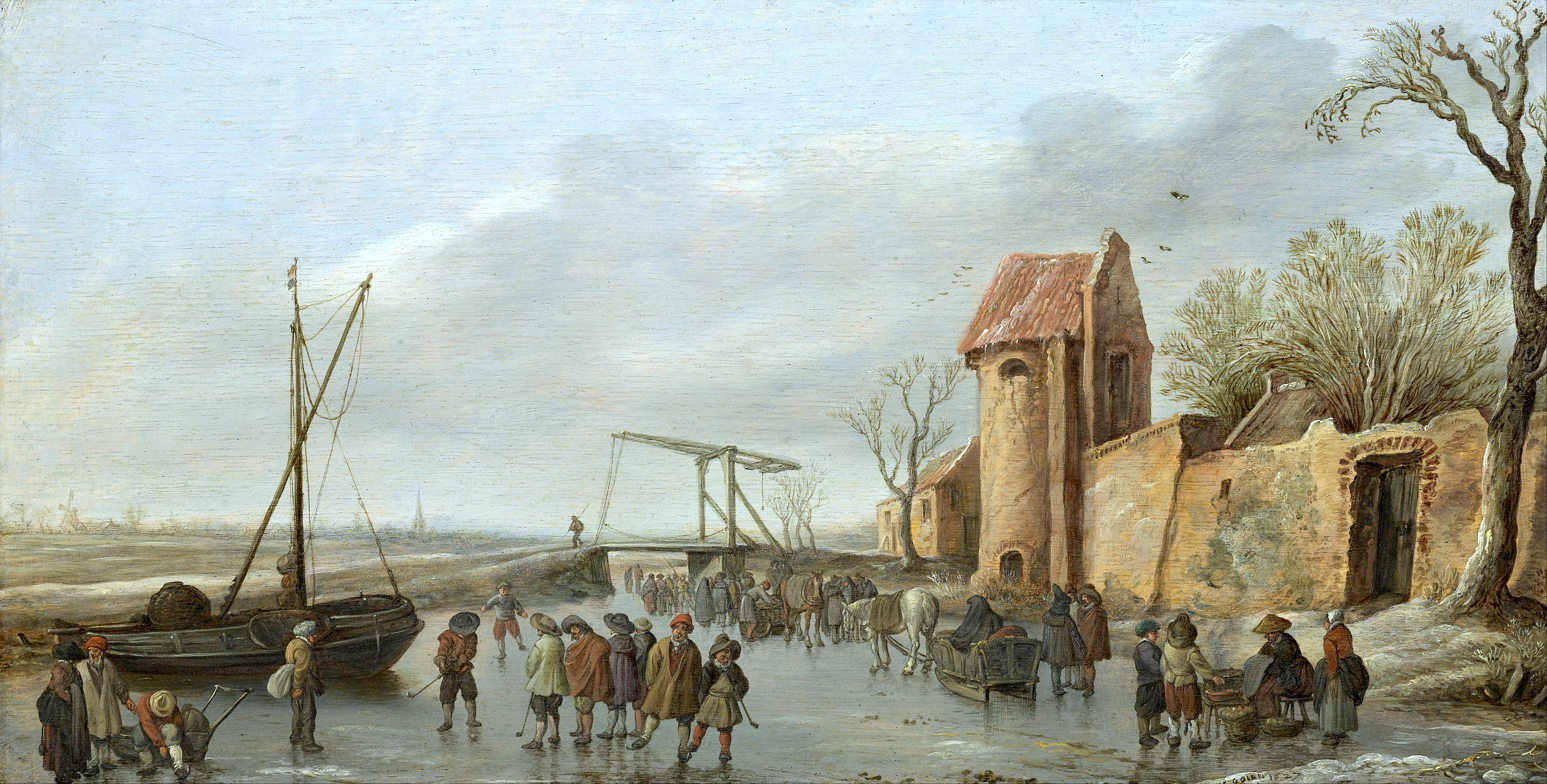
A winter scene by Jan van Goyen from the 17th century

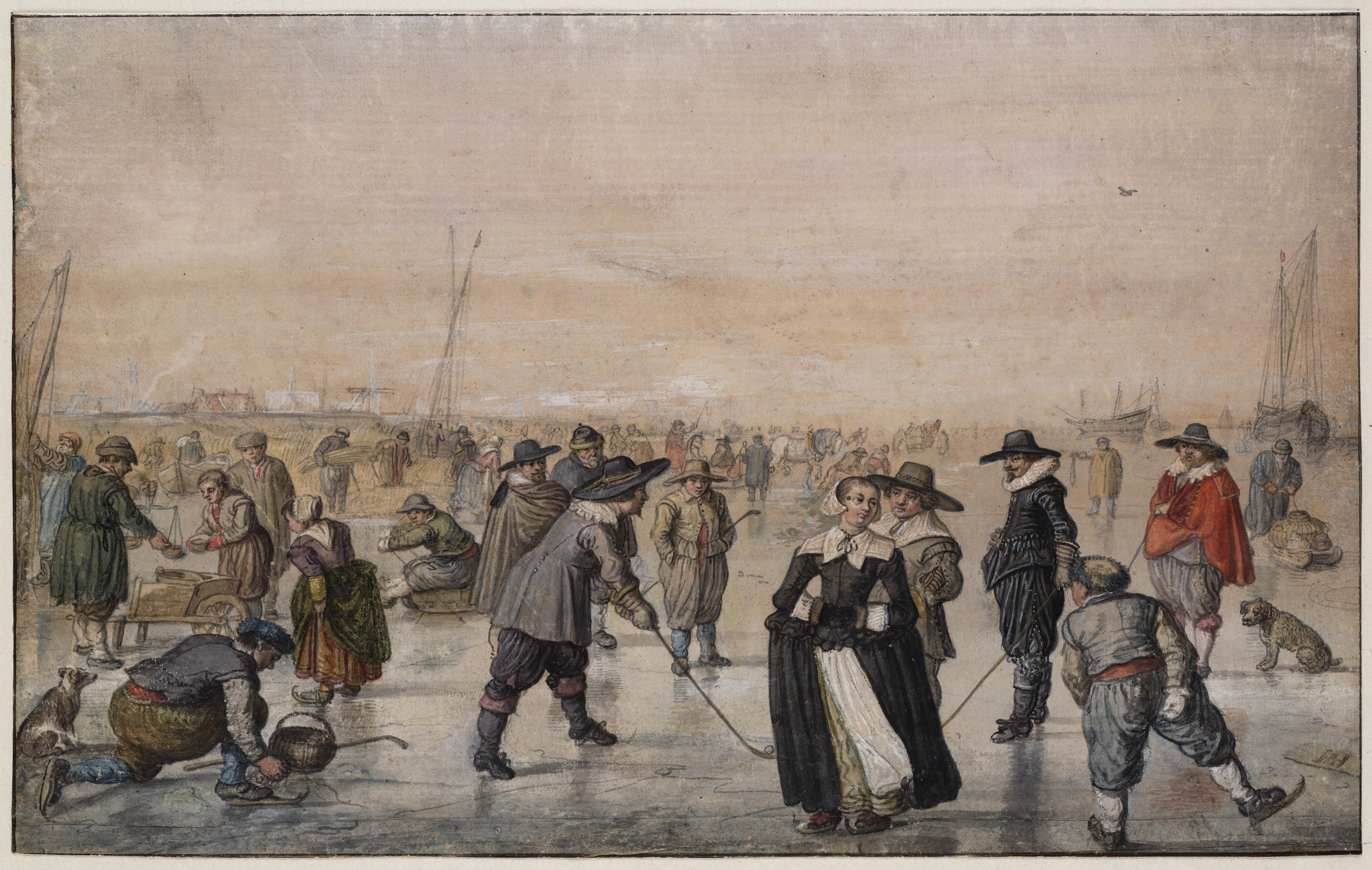
Winter landscape, with skaters playing ijscolf (Hendrick Avercamp, the 17th-century Dutch painter)

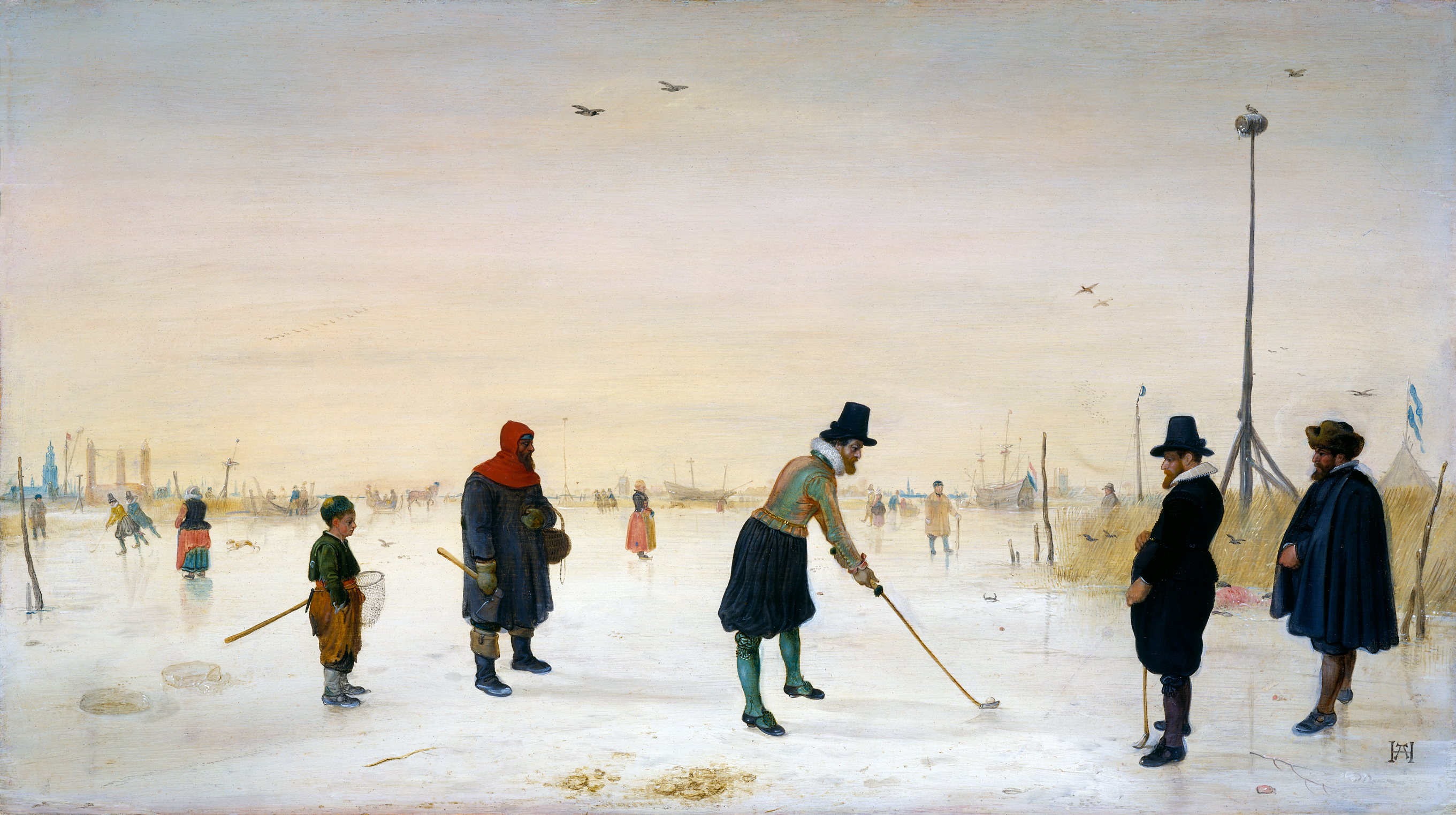
IJscolf players on ice in 1625 (Hendrick Avercamp).

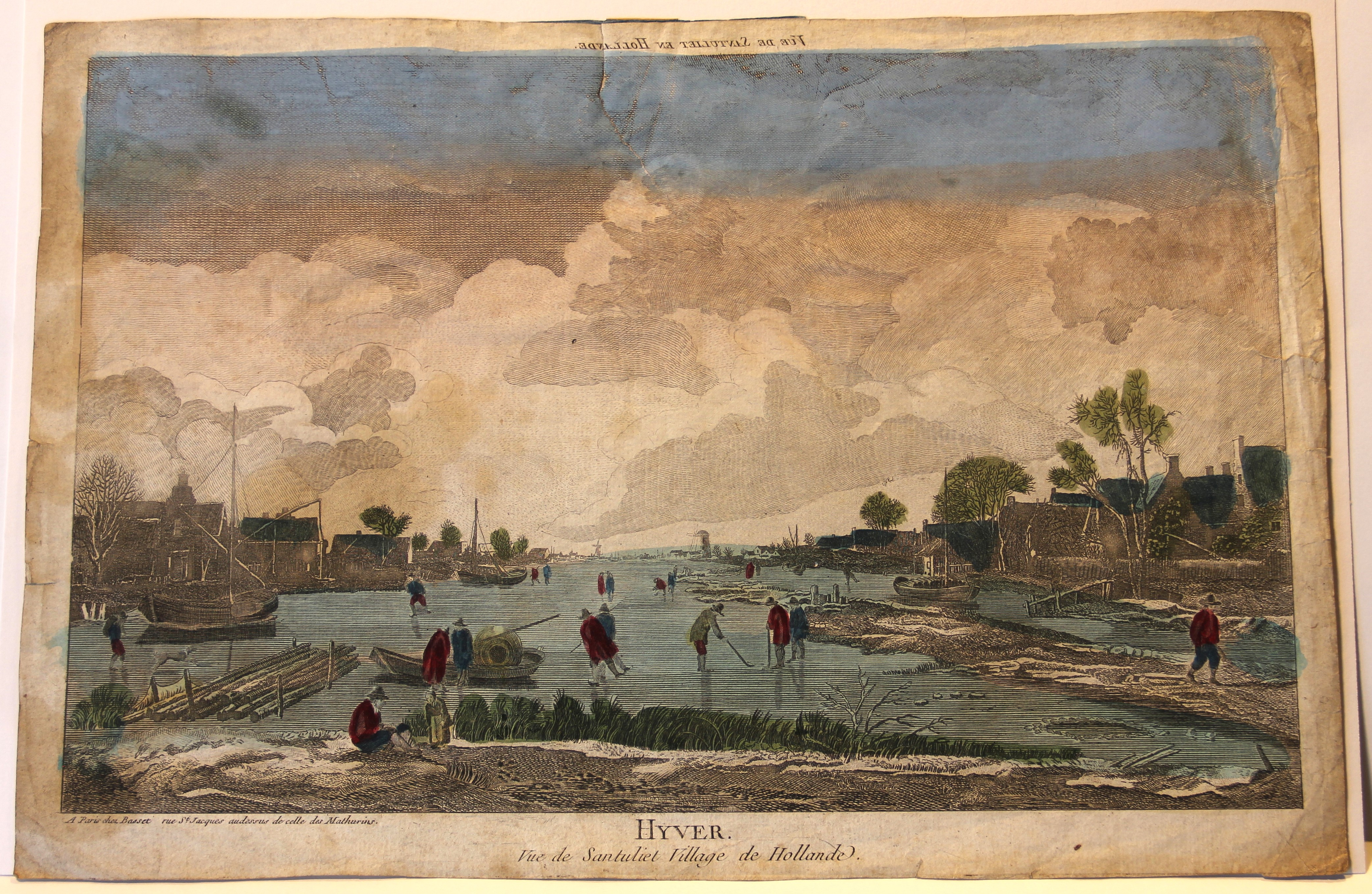
IJscolf activity on the waters of Zandvliet (Southern Netherlands) by Jacques-Philippe Le Bas (18th-century French engraver) who based his work on a painting by Adriaen van Drever

Stick-and-ball games themselves are very ancient. Games such as polo are known to have taken place in the pre-Christian era in Persia. In Europe, these games included the Irish game of hurling, the closely related Scottish game of shinty and versions of field hockey (including bandy ball, played in England). IJscolf, a game resembling colf on an ice-covered surface, was popular in the Low Countries between the Middle Ages and the Dutch Golden Age. It was played with a wooden curved bat (called a colf or kolf), a wooden or leather ball and two poles (or nearby landmarks), with the objective to hit the chosen point using the fewest strokes. A similar game (knattleikr) had been played for a thousand years or more by the Scandinavian peoples, as documented in the Icelandic sagas. Polo has been referred to as "hockey on horseback". In England, field hockey developed in the late 17th century, and there is evidence that some games of field hockey took place on the ice. These games of "hockey on ice" were sometimes played with a bung (a plug of cork or oak used as a stopper on a barrel). William Pierre Le Cocq stated, in a 1799 letter written in Chesham, England:

I must now describe to you the game of Hockey; we have each a stick turning up at the end. We get a bung. There are two sides one of them knocks one way and the other side the other way. If any one of the sides makes the bung reach that end of the churchyard it is victorious.

A 1797 engraving unearthed by Swedish sport historians Carl Gidén and Patrick Houda shows a person on skates with a stick and bung on the River Thames, probably in December 1796.

According to Kenth Hansen, one precursor was bandy:

The origin of ice hockey was bandy, a game that has its roots in the Middle Ages. Just as for practically all other sports, the game of bandy achieved its modern form during the 19th century in England, more exactly in the Fen district on the East coast. From the Fen district the game was spread to London and from London to the Continent during the second half of the 19th century.

British soldiers and immigrants to Canada and the United States brought their stick-and-ball games with them and played them on the ice and snow of winter.

To Roch Carrier, ice hockey is the synthesis of all of these precursors:

To while away their boredom and to stay in shape they [European colonial soldiers in North America] would play on the frozen rivers and lakes. The British [English] played bandy, the Scots played shinty and golf, the Irish, hurling, while the Dutch soldiers probably pursued ken jaegen. Curiosity led some to try lacrosse. Each group learned the game from the others. The most daring ventured to play on skates. All these contributions nourished a game that was evolving. Hockey was invented by all these people, all these cultures, all these individuals. Hockey is the conclusion of all these beginnings.

A mid-1830s watercolour portrays New Brunswick lieutenant-governor Sir Archibald Campbell and his family with British soldiers on skates playing a stick-on-ice sport. Captain R.G.A. Levinge, a British Army officer in New Brunswick during Campbell's time, wrote about "hockey on ice" on Chippewa Creek (a tributary of the Niagara River) in 1839. In 1843 another British Army officer in Kingston, Canada West, wrote, "Began to skate this year, improved quickly and had great fun at hockey on the ice." An 1859 Boston Evening Gazette article referred to an early game of hockey on ice in Halifax that year. An 1835 painting by John O'Toole depicts skaters with sticks and bung on a frozen stream in the American state of West Virginia, at that time still part of Virginia.

In that same era, the Mi'kmaq, a First Nations people of the Canadian Maritimes, also had a stick-and-ball game. Oral histories describe a traditional stick-and-ball game played by the Mi'kmaq, and Silas Tertius Rand (in his 1894 Legends of the Micmacs) describes a Mi'kmaq ball game known as tooadijik. Rand also describes a game played (probably after European contact) with hurleys, known as wolchamaadijik. Oochamkunutk was the name used by the Mi'kmaq to describe their own stick and ball game which they played on the ice while alchamadyk was what the Mi'kmaq called the new the game of "hurley on ice" which was played by others around the province during the same period. Of particular note among influential Mi'kmaqs is Joe Cope ("Old Joe"), a Mi'kmaq elder known for his talent for carving what became one of the earliest types of ice hockey sticks used. Cope once stated, "Long before the pale faces strayed to this country, the Mi'kmaqs were playing two ball games, a field game and an ice game." Sticks made by the Mi'kmaq were used by the British for their games.

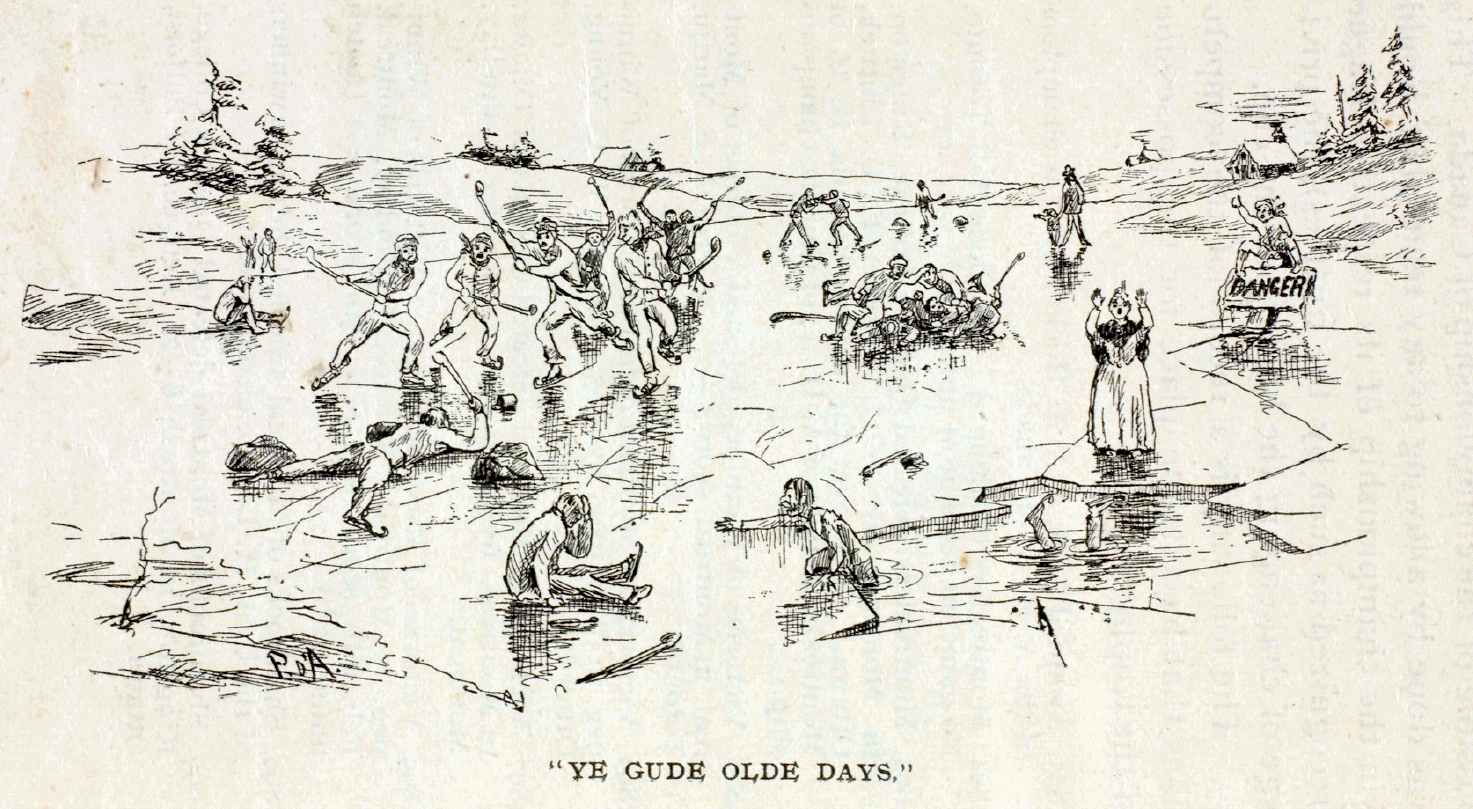
"Ye Gude Olde Days" from Hockey: Canada's Royal Winter Game, 1899

Early 19th-century paintings depict shinny, an early form of hockey with no standard rules which was played in Nova Scotia. Many of these early games absorbed the physical aggression of what the Onondaga called dehuntshigwa'es (lacrosse). Shinny was played on the St. Lawrence River at Montreal and Quebec City, and in Kingston and Ottawa. The number of players was often large. To this day, shinny (derived from the Scottish game of shinty) is a popular Canadian term for an informal type of hockey, either ice or street hockey.

Thomas Chandler Haliburton, in The Attaché: Second Series (published in 1844) imagined a dialogue, between two of the novel's characters, which mentions playing "hurly on the long pond on the ice". This has been interpreted by some historians from Windsor, Nova Scotia, as reminiscent of the days when the author was a student at King's College School in that town in 1810 and earlier. Based on Haliburton's quote, claims were made that modern hockey was invented in Windsor, Nova Scotia, by King's College students and perhaps named after an individual ("Colonel Hockey's game"). Others claim that the origins of hockey come from games played in the area of Dartmouth and Halifax in Nova Scotia. However, several references have been found to hurling and shinty being played on the ice long before the earliest references from both Windsor and Dartmouth/Halifax, and the word "hockey" was used to designate a stick-and-ball game at least as far back as 1773, as it was mentioned in the book Juvenile Sports and Pastimes, to Which Are Prefixed, Memoirs of the Author: Including a New Mode of Infant Education by Richard Johnson (Pseud. Master Michel Angelo), whose chapter XI was titled "New Improvements on the Game of Hockey".

== Initial development ==
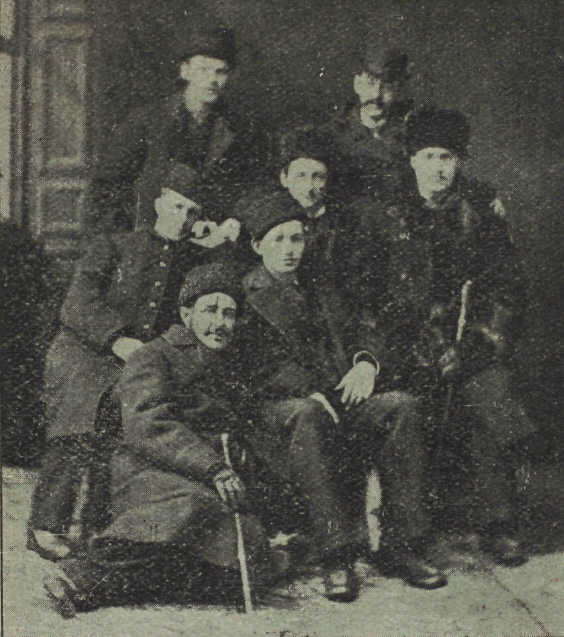
Members of the Montreal Victorias in 1881.

The city of Montreal, Quebec, Canada, became the center of the development of contemporary ice hockey, and is recognized as the birthplace of organized ice hockey. On March 3, 1875, the first organized indoor game was played at Montreal's Victoria Skating Rink between two nine-player teams, including James Creighton and several McGill University students. Instead of a ball or bung, the game featured a "flat circular piece of wood" (to keep it in the rink and to protect spectators). The goal posts were 8 feet (2.4 m) apart (today's goals are 6 ft [1.8 m] wide). Some observers of the game at McGill made quick note of its surprisingly aggressive and violent nature.

Shins and heads were battered, benches smashed and the lady spectators fled in confusion.

— The Daily British Whig

In 1876, games played in Montreal were "conducted under the 'Hockey Association' rules"; the Hockey Association was England's field hockey organization. In 1877, The Gazette (Montreal) published a list of seven rules, six of which were largely based on six of the Hockey Association's twelve rules, with only minor differences (even the word "ball" was kept); the one added rule explained how disputes should be settled. The McGill University Hockey Club, the first ice hockey club, was founded in 1877 (followed by the Quebec Hockey Club in 1878 and the Montreal Victorias in 1881). In 1880, the number of players per side was reduced from nine to seven.

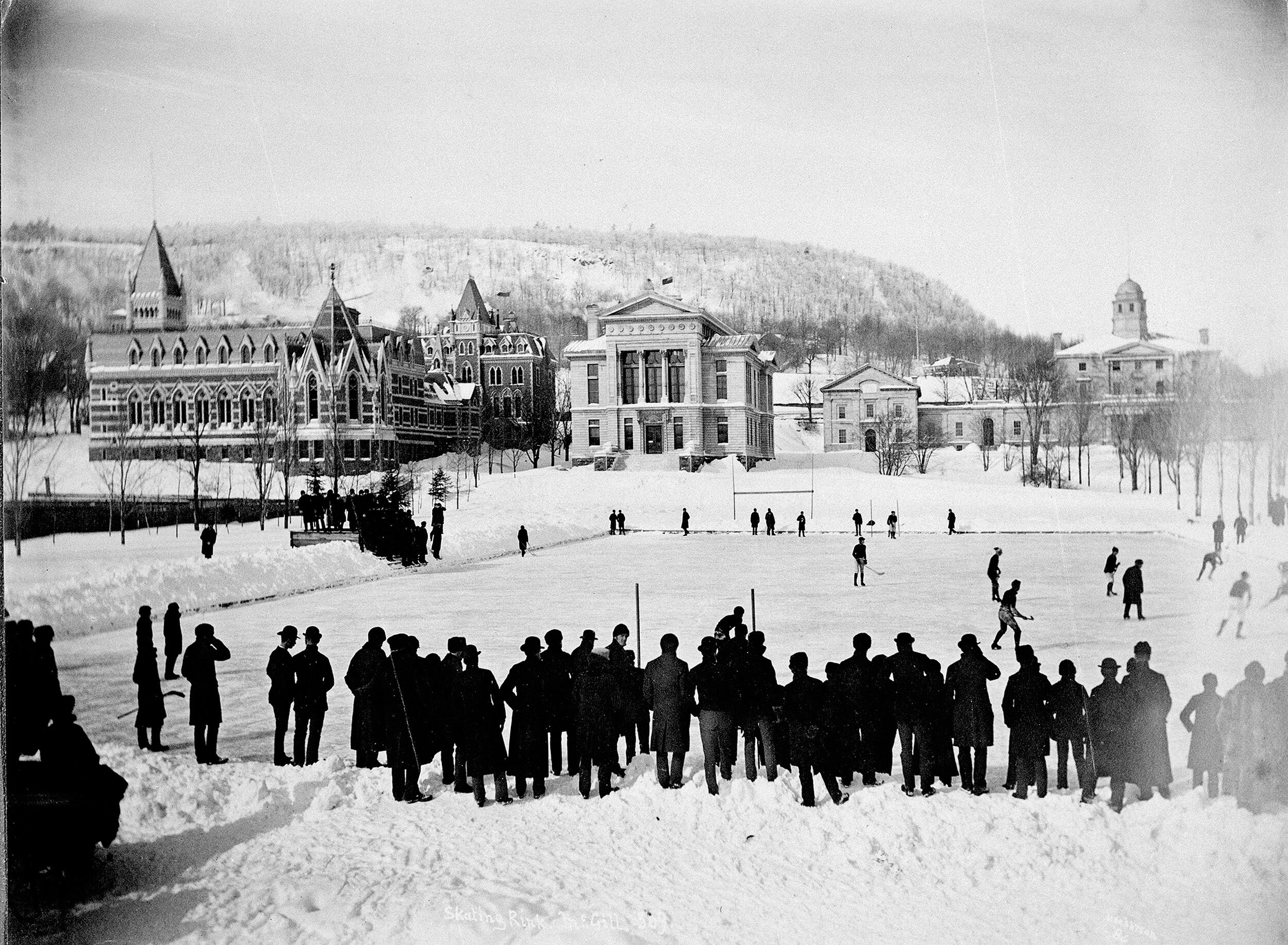
An ice hockey game held at McGill University in 1884

The number of teams grew, enough to hold the first "world championship" of ice hockey at Montreal's annual Winter Carnival in 1883. The McGill team won the tournament and was awarded the Carnival Cup. The game was divided into thirty-minute halves. The positions were now named: left and right wing, centre, rover, point and cover-point, and goaltender. In 1886, the teams competing at the Winter Carnival organized the Amateur Hockey Association of Canada (AHAC), and played a season comprising "challenges" to the existing champion.

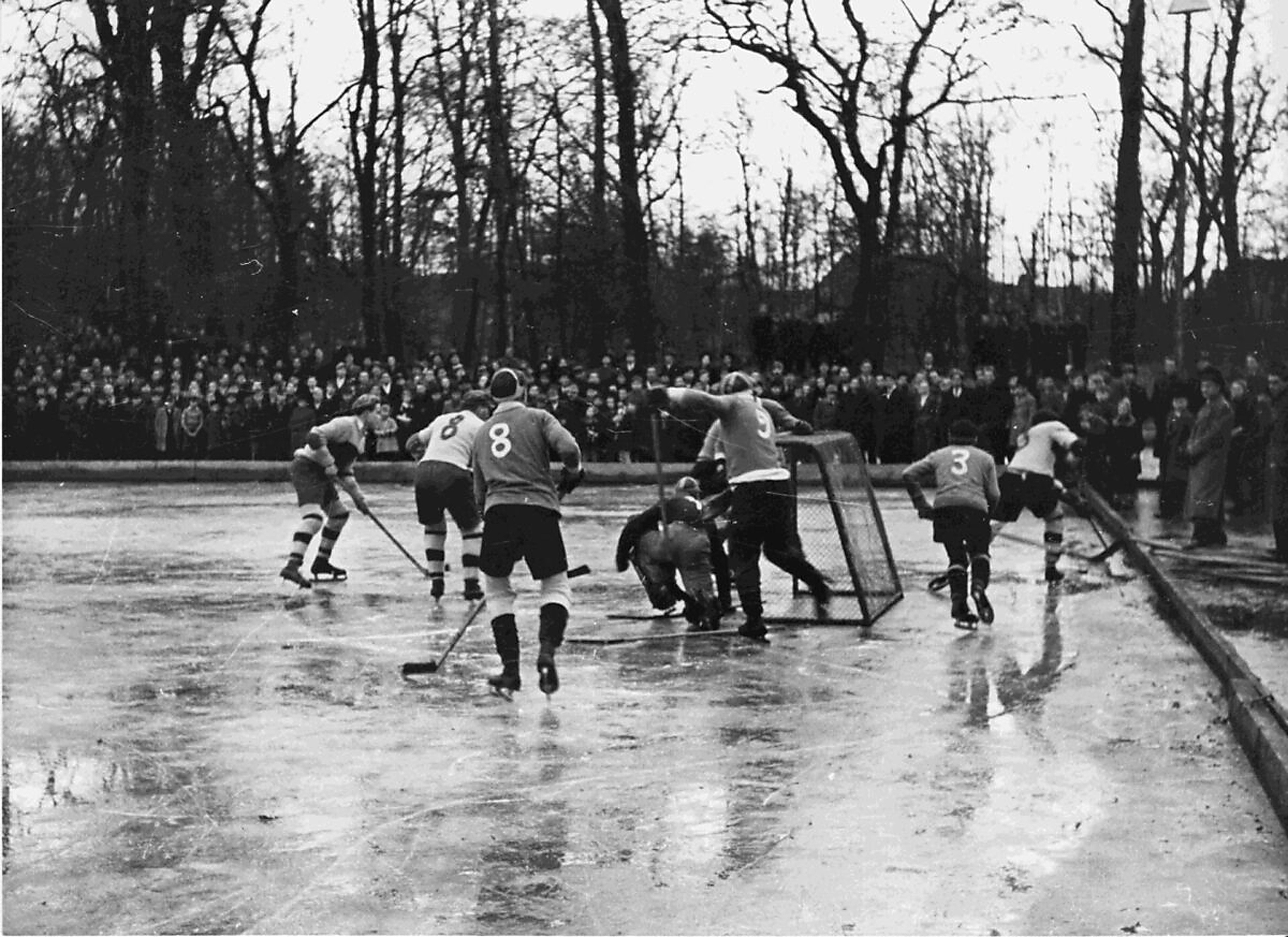
Ice hockey in early postwar Germany: A game between Aschaffenburg and Darmstadt in the 1948/49 season.

In Europe, it was previously believed that in 1885 the Oxford University Ice Hockey Club was formed to play the first Ice Hockey Varsity Match against traditional rival Cambridge in St. Moritz, Switzerland; however, this is now considered to have been a game of bandy. A similar claim which turned out to be accurate is that the oldest rivalry in ice hockey history is between Queen's University at Kingston and Royal Military College of Kingston, Ontario, with the first known match taking place in 1886.

In 1888, the Governor General of Canada, The Lord Stanley of Preston, first attended the Montreal Winter Carnival tournament and was impressed with the game. His sons and his daughter, Isobel Stanley, were hockey enthusiasts. In 1892, realizing that there was no recognition for the best team in Canada (although a number of leagues had championship trophies), he purchased a silver bowl for use as a trophy. The Dominion Hockey Challenge Cup (which later became known as the Stanley Cup) was first awarded in 1893 to the Montreal Hockey Club, champions of the AHAC; it continues to be awarded annually to the National Hockey League's championship team. Stanley's son Arthur helped organize the Ontario Hockey Association, and Stanley's daughter Isobel was one of the first women to play ice hockey.

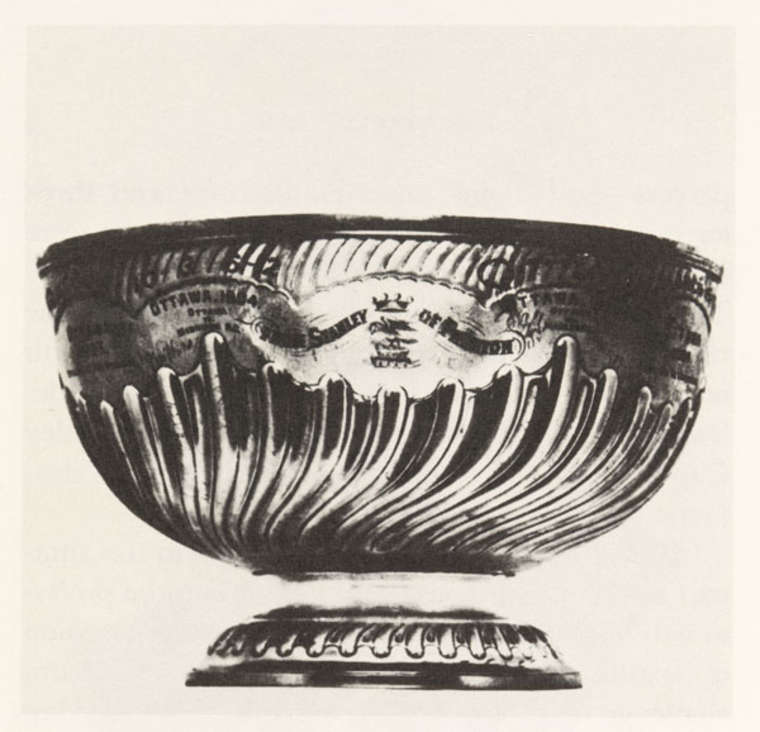
The Stanley Cup in 1893

By 1893, there were almost a hundred teams in Montreal alone; in addition, there were leagues throughout Canada. Winnipeg hockey players used cricket pads to better protect the goaltender's legs; they also introduced the "scoop" shot, or what is now known as the wrist shot. William Fairbrother, from Ontario, Canada, is credited with inventing the ice hockey net in the 1890s. Goal nets became a standard feature of the Canadian Amateur Hockey League in 1900. Left and right defence began to replace the point and cover-point positions in the OHA in 1906.

American financier Malcolm Greene Chace is credited with being the father of hockey in the United States. In 1892, Chace put together a team of men from Yale, Brown, and Harvard, and toured across Canada as captain of this team. The first collegiate hockey match in the United States was played between Yale and Johns Hopkins in Baltimore in 1896. In 1896, the first ice hockey league in the US was formed. The US Amateur Hockey League was founded in New York City, shortly after the opening of the artificial-ice St. Nicholas Rink.

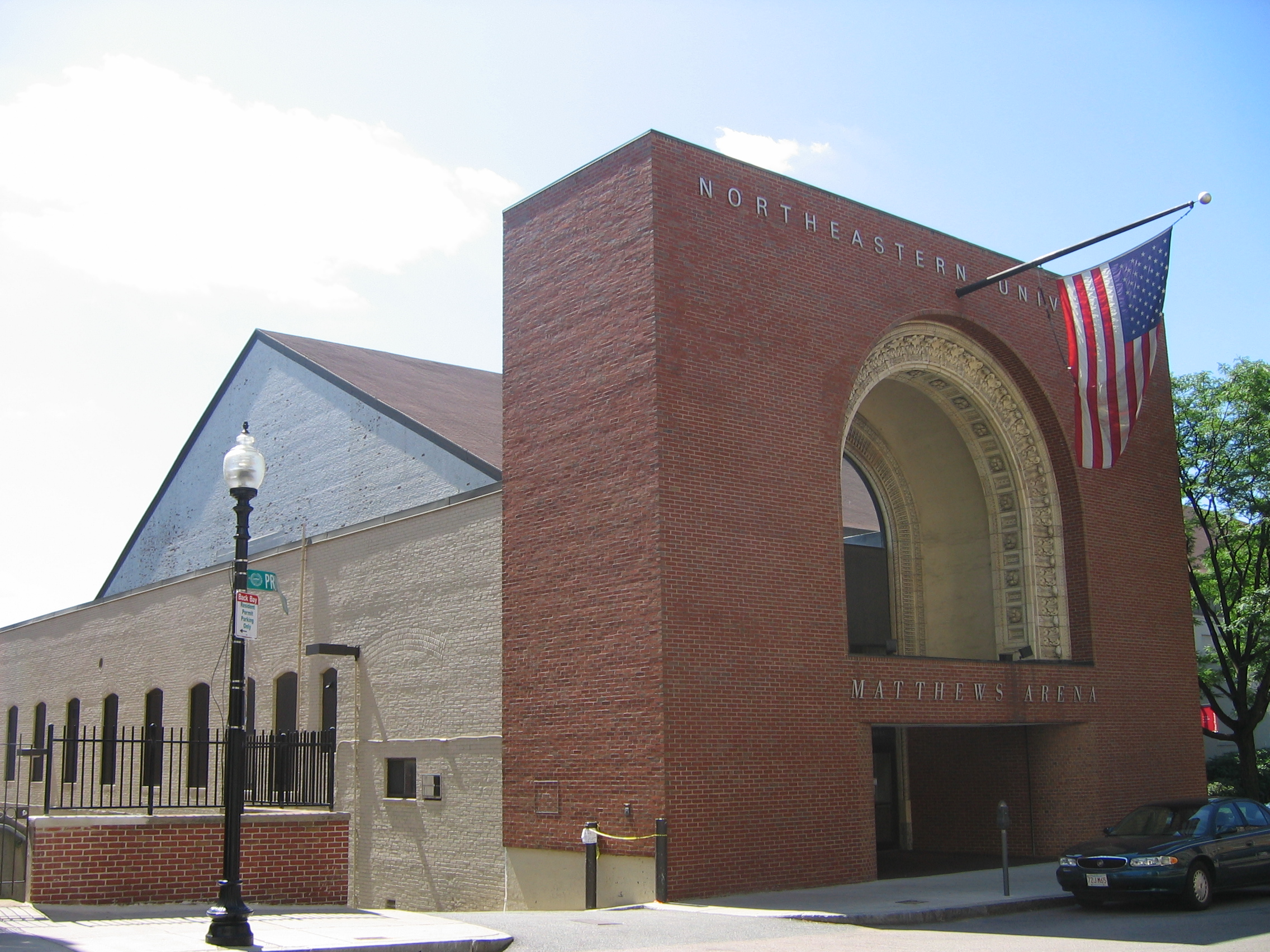
Matthews Arena in Boston was the oldest indoor ice hockey arena still in operation. Demolition began in March 2026.

By 1898 the following leagues had already formed: the Amateur Hockey League of New York, the Amateur Hockey Association of Canada, and the Ontario Hockey Association. The 1898 Spalding Athletic Library book includes rules and results for each league.

Stanley's five sons were instrumental in bringing ice hockey to Europe, defeating a court team (which included the future Edward VII and George V) at Buckingham Palace in 1895. By 1903, a five-team league had been founded. The Ligue Internationale de Hockey sur Glace was founded in 1908 to govern international competition, and the first European championship was won by Great Britain in 1910. The sport grew further in Europe in the 1920s, after ice hockey became an Olympic sport. Many bandy players switched to hockey to be able to compete in the Olympics. In the mid-20th century, the Ligue became the International Ice Hockey Federation.

As the popularity of ice hockey as a spectator sport grew, earlier rinks were replaced by larger rinks. Most of the early indoor ice rinks have been demolished; Montreal's Victoria Rink, built in 1862, was demolished in 1925. Many older rinks succumbed to fire, such as Denman Arena, Dey's Arena, Quebec Skating Rink and Montreal Arena, a hazard of the buildings' wood construction. The Stannus Street Rink in Windsor, Nova Scotia (built in 1897) may be the oldest still in existence; however, it is no longer used for hockey. The Aberdeen Pavilion (built in 1898) in Ottawa was used for hockey in 1904 and is the oldest existing facility that has hosted Stanley Cup games.

Until December 2025, the oldest indoor ice hockey arena in use for hockey was Boston's Matthews Arena, which was built in 1910. It had been modified extensively several times in its history and was most recently used by Northeastern University for hockey and other sports. Demolition began in February 2026, with plans to build a new facility. It was the original home rink of the Boston Bruins professional team, itself the oldest United States-based team in the NHL, starting play in the league in what was then called Boston Arena on December 1, 1924. Princeton University's Hobey Baker Memorial Rink was built in 1923 and is now the oldest indoor hockey arena still in use and in Division I hockey; Princeton has the distinction of being the school that has played in its current rink the longest. Madison Square Garden in New York City, built in 1968, is the oldest continuously-operating arena in the NHL.

== Professional era ==
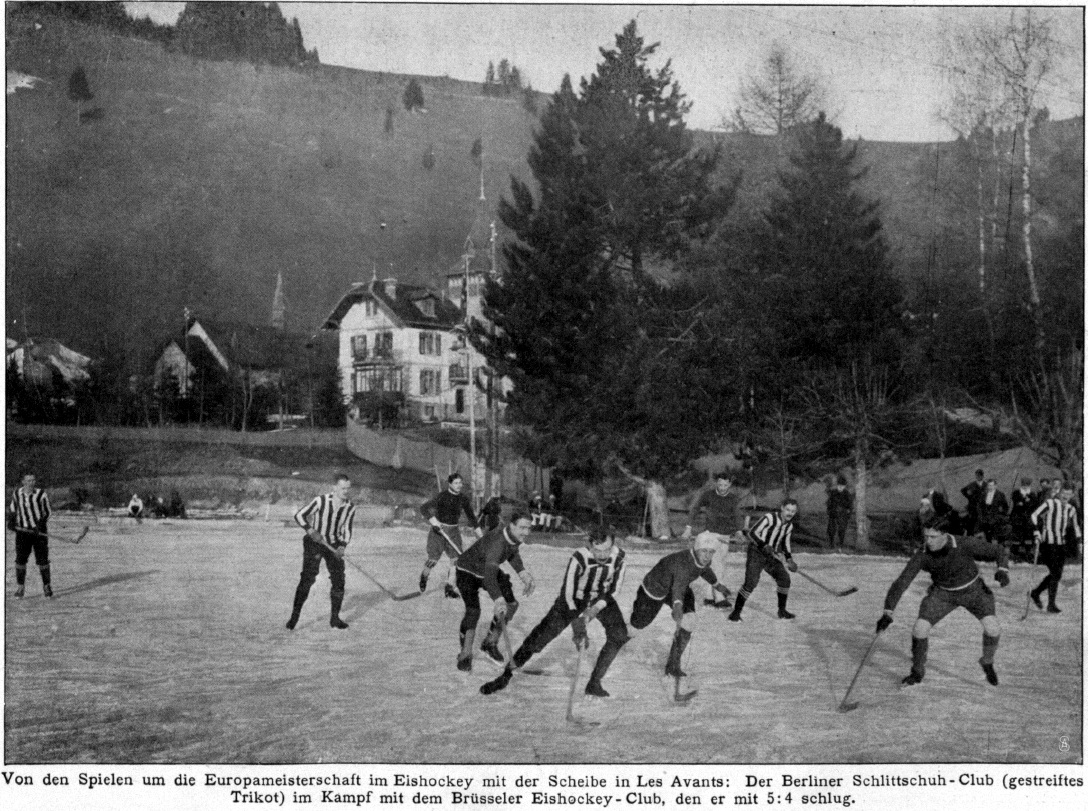
An ice hockey game between Berliner Schlittschuhclub and Brussels Royal IHSC at the 1910 European Championship

While scattered incidents of players taking pay to play hockey occurred as early as the 1890s, those found to have done so were banned from playing in the amateur leagues which dominated the sport. By 1902, the Western Pennsylvania Hockey League (WPHL) was the first to employ professionals. The league joined with teams in Michigan and Ontario to form the first fully professional league—the International Professional Hockey League (IPHL)—in 1904. The WPHL and IPHL hired players from Canada; in response, Canadian leagues began to pay players (who played with amateurs). The IPHL, cut off from its largest source of players, disbanded in 1907. By then, several professional hockey leagues were operating in Canada (with leagues in Manitoba, Ontario and Quebec).

In 1910, the National Hockey Association (NHA) was formed in Montreal. The NHA further refined the rules: dropping the rover position, dividing the game into three 20-minute periods and introducing minor and major penalties. After re-organizing as the National Hockey League in 1917, the league expanded into the United States, starting with the Boston Bruins in 1924.

Professional hockey leagues developed later in Europe, but amateur leagues leading to national championships were in place. One of the first was the Swiss National League A, founded in 1916. Today, professional leagues have been introduced in most countries of Europe. Top European leagues include the Kontinental Hockey League, the Czech Extraliga, the Finnish SM-liiga and the Swedish Hockey League.
