= Pond Hockey =

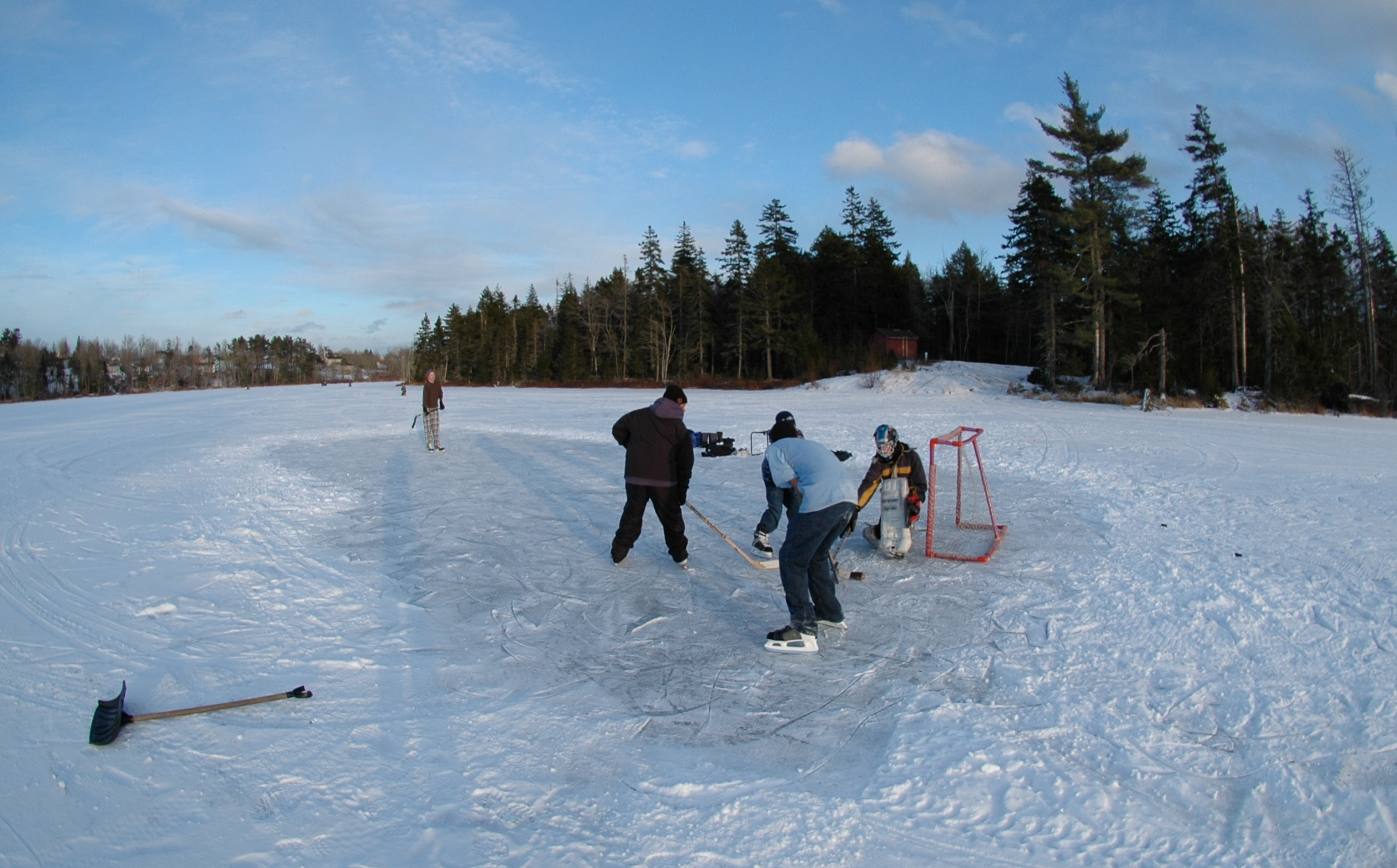
- The documentary crew shoots a pick-up game of pond hockey in Nova Scotia, Canada.
- Directed by: Tommy Haines
- Written by: Tommy Haines
- Produced by: Tommy Haines, JT Haines, Andrew Sherburne, Nick Deutsch, Philip Falcone (executive producer)
- Starring: Wayne Gretzky; Neal Broten; Sidney Crosby
- Production company: Northland Films
- Release date: 2008
- Running time: 82 minutes
- Country: United States
- Language: English

Pond Hockey is a 2008 American documentary film, directed by Tommy Haines, and produced by Northland Films. The film is an examination of the changing culture of pond hockey.

== Synopsis ==
Director Tommy Haines and his Minnesota crew chronicle the changing culture of hockey through interviews with Wayne Gretzky, Neal Broten, Sidney Crosby, and local rinkrats, interwoven with the story of the first U.S. Pond Hockey Championships. The tournament was composed of 100 teams; the film follows two of these teams: the Federal League Allstars and Sofa King Lazy.

== Critical reception ==
Pond Hockey showed at several North American film festivals and ultimately aired nationally on the NHL Network. The film was hailed as the "best and purest hockey movie ever" by ESPN's John Buccigross and one of Indiewire's "10 Great Sports Docs". The film was also included in the New York Times coverage of outdoor hockey's article "N.H.L. Ties Its Brand to Great Outdoors".

== Notable cast ==
- Wayne Gretzky
- Neal Broten
- John Mayasich
- Sidney Crosby
- Marian Gaborik
- Lou Nanne
- John Buccigross
- Willard Ikola
- Phil Housley
- Jeff Sorem
- John "Bug" Blooston
- Patrick Kane
- Wendell Anderson
- Krissy Wendell
- Dave Miller
- Mark Kovacich
- Rick DiPietro
- Charles McGrath
- Jack Falla
- Jordan Leopold
- Matt Henderson
- Dan Hendrickson
- P. J. Axelsson
- Jonathan Toews

== Producers ==
- Director/producer - Tommy Haines
- Producer - JT Haines
- Producer - Andrew Sherburne
- Producer - Nick Deutsch
- Executive producer - Northland Films
- Executive producer - Philip Falcone

== Festivals/awards ==
- "Best of Fest" selection at the 2008 Minneapolis/St. Paul International Film Festival
- Official Selection of the 2008 Rhode Island International Film Festival
- Official Selection of the 2008 Free Range Film Festival
- Winner of the "Audience Award" at the 2008 Landlocked International Film Festival
- Official Selection of the 2010 Canadian Sports Film Festival

== Philip Falcone ==
The executive producer, Philip Falcone, was a college hockey stand out and graduate from Harvard University, and is currently a General Partner of the Minnesota Wild.

== Filming locations ==
- Connecticut
- Illinois
- Minnesota
- Massachusetts
- New Jersey
- New York
- Nova Scotia

== See also ==
- List of films about ice hockey
