= Pond hockey =

Form of ice hockey played on frozen ponds

Pond Hockey
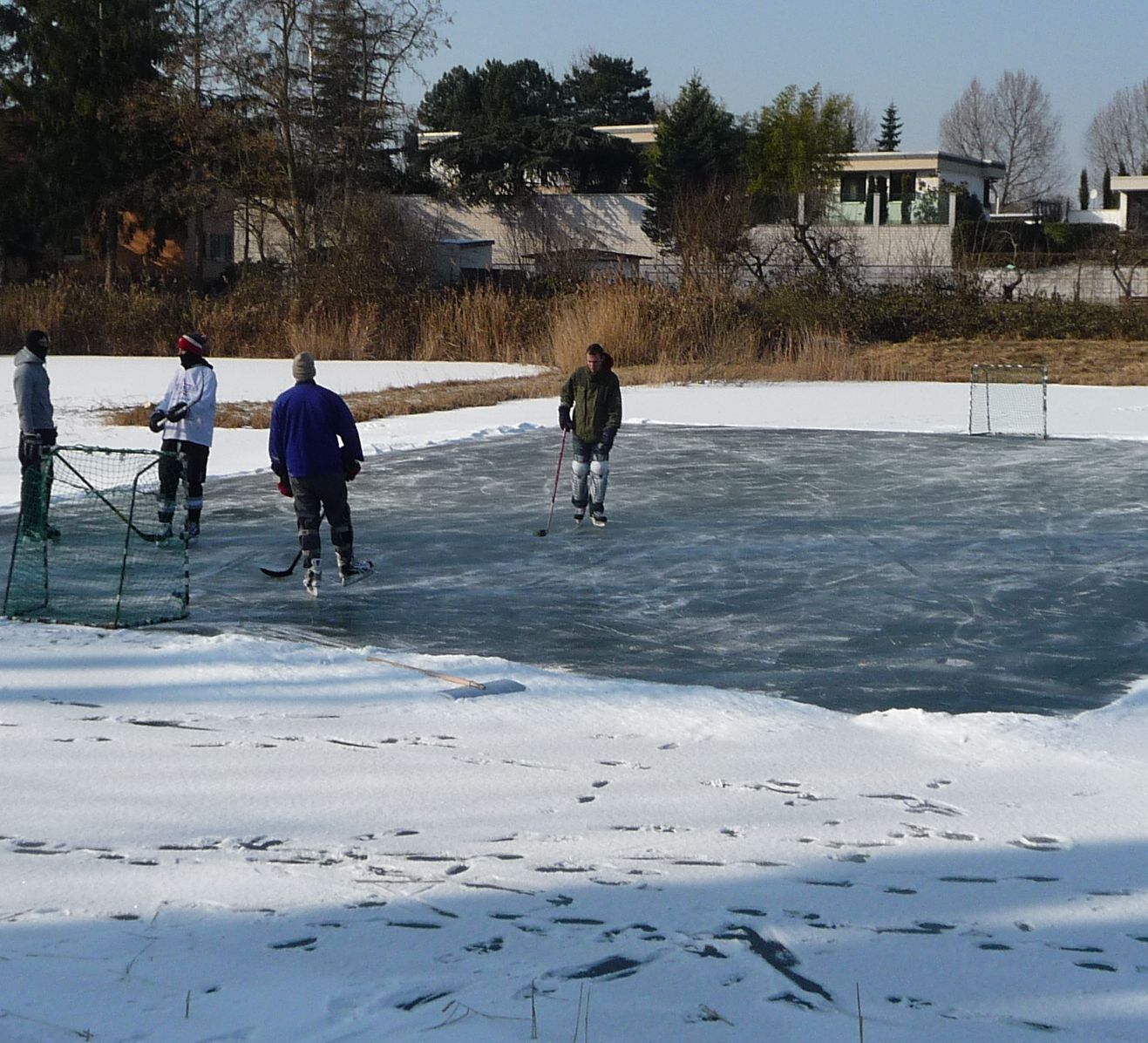
- A small pond hockey field
- Nicknames: Ice hockey, Shinny, Pick-up hockey

Characteristics
- Type: Primarily outdoors
- Equipment: Required: A ball or a puck (most players use a puck if ice conditions allow, but a ball can be used if the ice has a rough surface), a hockey stick, a net. Optional: Shin pads, gloves, helmet.

Presence
- Olympic: No

Pond hockey is a form of ice hockey similar in its object and appearance to traditional ice hockey, but simplified and designed to be played on part of a natural frozen body of water. The rink is 50 to 80 percent the size of a standard NHL-specification rink, and has no boards or glass surrounding it; usually only a barrier of snow keeps the puck in play. In addition, because there are no protective barriers behind the goal to contain high errant shots, the top of the goal is lower, in fact only slightly taller than the width of a puck, and the game does not have a formal goalie. Because of these differences, pond hockey places more emphasis on skating and puckhandling ability and less on shooting and checking. Non-competitive pond hockey is played with improvised goals, rinks of a variety of sizes, and no boards or snow barriers. There can only be 4 players playing per team at a time but have multiple subs to sub in.

The World Pond Hockey Championships is an annual organized international competition held in Plaster Rock, New Brunswick.

The term "pond hockey" is often used, especially in Canada, as a synonym to shinny. In that context, it is meant to describe any form of unorganized ice hockey that is played outdoors, typically on a naturally frozen body of water.

== History ==
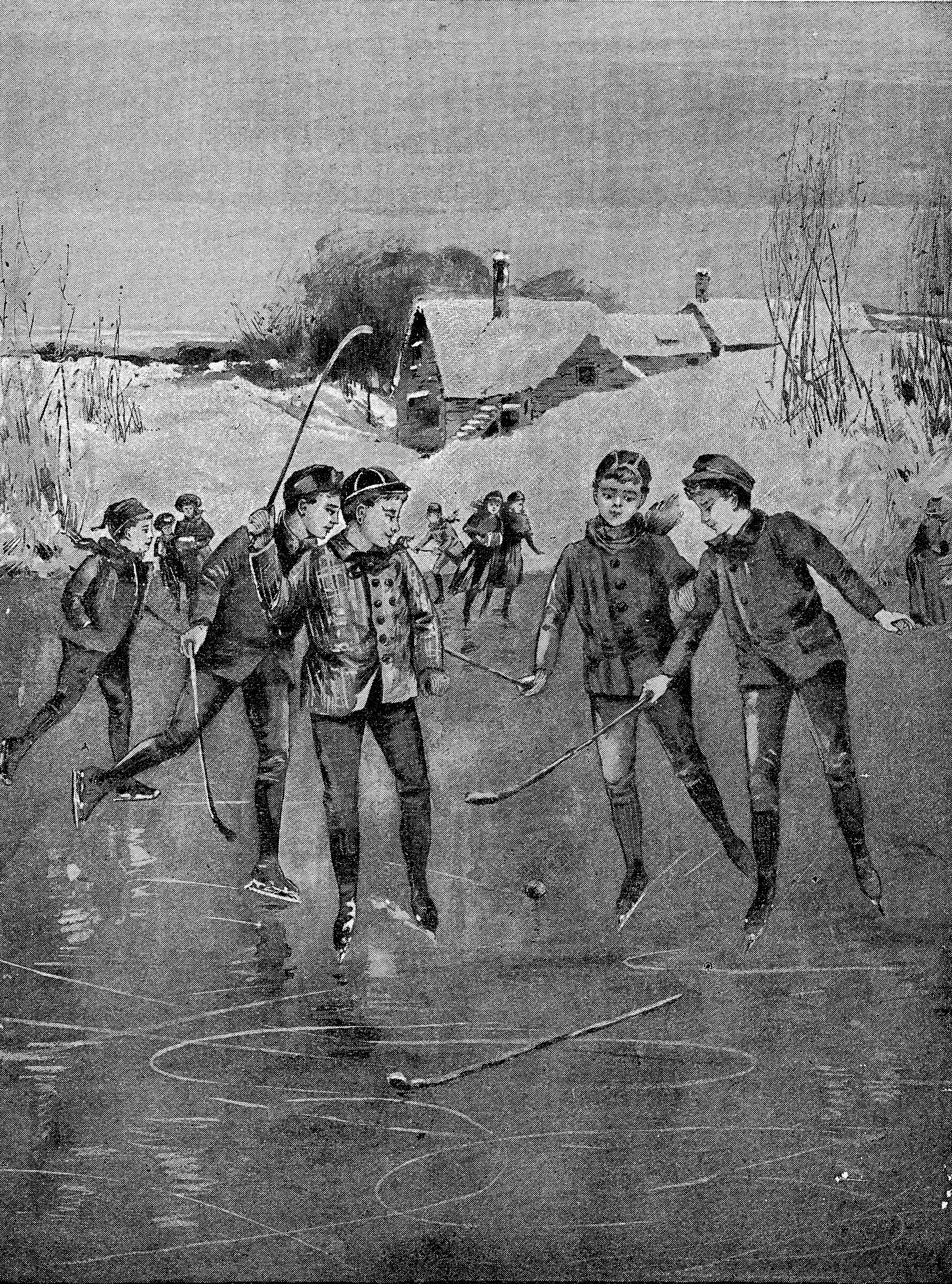
Children playing pond hockey, 1890s

Organized outdoor hockey has been played a number of years before indoor rinks were popularized. Pond hockey or shinny has its origins in early Navajo Native American culture. The story of shinny came from a Navajo story where a stranger challenged a Navajo god to a game of shinny in order to free Navajo slaves. Free men and slaves lined up and an agreement was made, the terms of which was as follows. If the Navajo god won the free men would become slaves, but if the slaves won the slaves would be free. Then a bird came to the stranger and said, that if he were to hit the ball lightly the bird would take the ball across the line (commonly known as a goal). The god went first and hit the ball as hard as he could. It did not make it to the line, so the stranger went next and hit the ball lightly. The bird then took the ball and flew across the line. The slaves were then free men and hopped across the line to greet their relatives.

Shinny was not just a part of Navajo culture it was part of a number of Indian stories. Some stories say that the stick or bat represented the clubs used by war gods. Shinny was also used to praise gods, and people would play in honor of a certain god. The Cherokees used it as training for war and called it "little brother of war". It was also played for celebratory purposes, for example, the Makahs of Canada who played to celebrate catching a whale which was the main source of food for the tribe in the winter. Shinny was played by almost all tribes; women were also allowed to play, sometimes they would even play with or against men of the tribe. Most of the time the game was played with one stick or bat to hit the ball across the line however, the Makahs were the only tribe to use two bats. The bats are made from wood, they were thin with a curve and wider part at the end to hit the ball. During the game the players would use their feet to move the ball forward but they could never use their hands. The ball was made from different materials. Some balls were made from a knot in a tree, some were made of whale bone, others were made of buffalo hair covered with the skin of a buck. These balls were also coloured with interesting patterns. It is said that some tribes in North Dakota could not accept losing and would kill anyone who beat them. The distance between the goals is unknown, however, it is guessed that they were anywhere from 200 to 1,400 yards (180 to 1,280 m). They were usually as big as the land could suffice for; they also corresponded to the number of players. It is also said that the Hopi Indian had fields spanning eight miles (13 km) with the goals reaching as far as two villages. During play both teams were even, with up to five-hundred players on each team. Hockey was originally played on a field but was then adapted to play on ice. In some areas of the Midwestern United States, for example Northbrook, Illinois, the game is referred to as Puck.

== Game ==
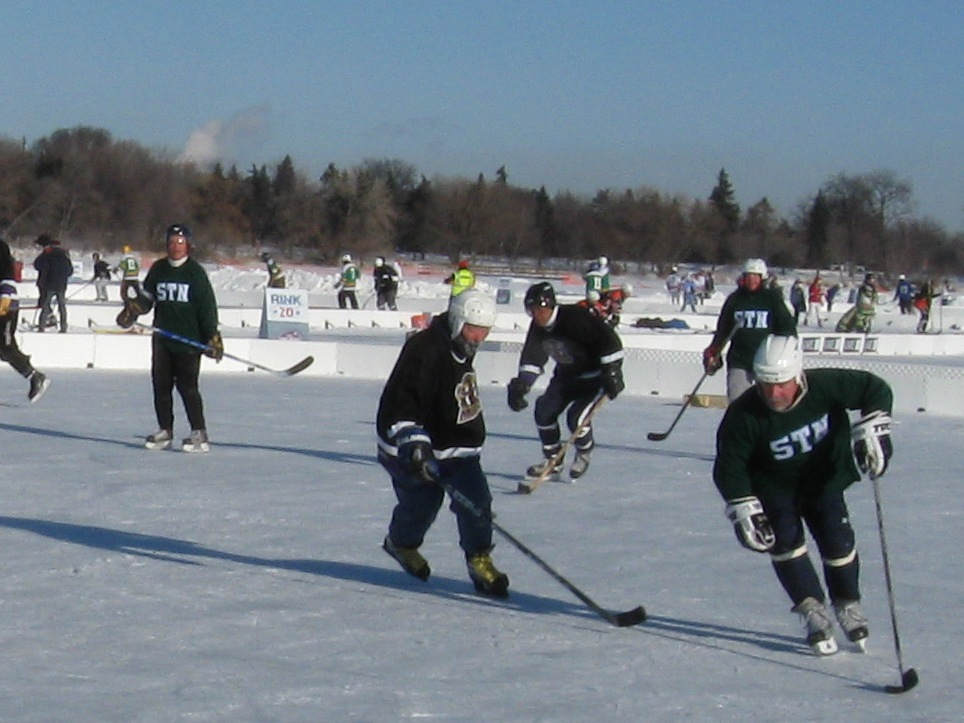
Pond hockey played on the Lake Nokomis in Minnesota, USA in January 2009.

Pond hockey is just like indoor ice hockey but is played outdoors and most of the time on a lake or pond. Pond hockey tournaments are typically played four on four but when playing casually there is no set number of players on a team, though the players try to balance the sides as best they can. Depending on equipment and player's availabilities, pond hockey may or may not use a goalie. If a goalie is not used, the goals can be defined with anything from open, regular hockey nets to player's boots. Since pond hockey started the popularity has soared, official pond hockey tournaments are found across the globe. Pond hockey tournaments have entwined the concept of youth pick-up hockey into a serious art form. The rink can range from any size or shape but they typically resemble a scaled-down regular indoor ice hockey rink. Some pond hockey rinks use boards, however, in most, the surrounding piled up snow from clearing the pond or lake makes a good substitute. In some of the more prominent pond hockey tournaments official ice hockey boards are used. One rink for example, the rink from the U.S. Pond Hockey Championship is set up into 155-foot (47 m) long ovals.

== Equipment ==
Because pond hockey discourages hard physical contact, the equipment involved is basic. Hockey helmets are not mandatory, but recently the trend has been to wear a helmet for apparent safety reasons, also shin pads have evolved into popular use. Most pond hockey enthusiasts also decide to wear gloves, because of the temperature and because gloves provide safety from unintentional slashing from hockey sticks, or skates. Other equipment involved corresponds directly to basic ice hockey equipment such as a hockey stick, skates, and a hockey puck. Depending on player and equipment availability as well as proximity to the pond hockey rink, a typical hockey net can be seen being used. However, in classic pick-up pond hockey, the game is planned quite spontaneously and quickly and the idea of a net could be abandoned. In this case, the goal could be defined by almost anything, but is usually clothing or footwear.

== Tactics ==
The most important tactic to possess in pond hockey is good passing, because incomplete passes can result in losing pucks in the surrounding snow. Most of the game consists of open ice puck handling; therefore hand-eye coordination is crucial. Speed is also an important ingredient that makes a good pond hockey player. There are sometimes no goalies used in pond hockey which almost guarantees goals on break away streaks. In pond hockey, a good player does not specialize in offense or defense, rather teamwork becomes important. Due to the possible lack of a goalie, or indeed a skilled goalie, everyone has to work together to make sure the other team does not get an easy goal. Playing intelligently becomes key. If a player makes a bad pass or slips over an opponent, the opponent will have an easy attempt at a goal.

== Rules ==
The rules of pond hockey generally follow the same set of rules as ice hockey but are typically less strict depending on the players and the level of play involved. There is also variability in the rules depending on other factors such as how many players there are and what equipment is available. More rules are often followed in high level play, such as in organized tournaments.

Many ice hockey rules are not observed in pond hockey due to the different playing areas. Rules such as offsides and icing are often not followed due to the difficulty in their regulation. One of the other major differences in pond hockey is that checking rarely occurs due to players not wearing the same level of padding as they would playing normal ice hockey.

Another distinctive rule in pond hockey is the concept of picking teams, which usually occurs in pick-up games. Since teams are generally not organized, they have to be picked before the game starts. Teams are often either picked by designated captains or by a method known as “drawing sticks” or “sticks in the middle”. This method involves all the players putting their sticks in a pile where one of the players then separates them into two groups, each with half the sticks. The players who have their sticks in the same group are then on the same team. However, in some of the organized tournaments, like the Leinenkugel's Classic Pond Hockey annual event in Wausau, WI, teams are pre-established based on regions or schools they represent. One major difference when it comes to Pond Hockey is that all goals are scored from the center. Extra shot are to be taken from center of ice and should be endeavored in the span of 30 seconds of the penalty being called. Anybody in the opposing team can make the effort. The team that is granted the extra shot will likewise be offered ownership of the puck following the penalty chance attempt (no matter what is the result of the shot).

== Tournaments ==
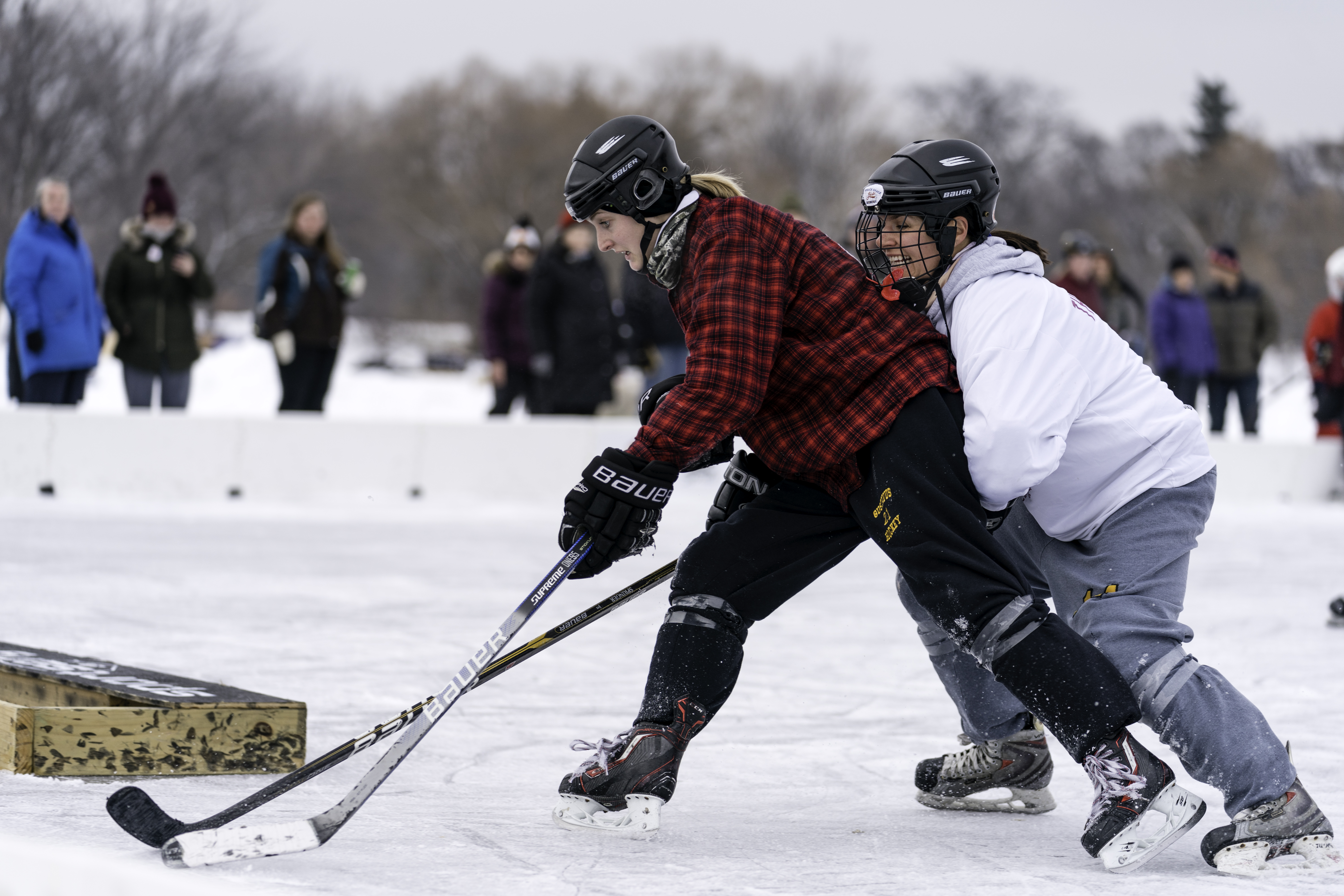
Players in the women's final at the 2020 US Pond Hockey Championships

There are multiple Pond hockey tournaments in the United States and Canada. Five of the more prominent ones are the BC Pond Hockey Series, Canadian National Pond Hockey Championships, U.S. Pond Hockey Championships, the World Pond Hockey Championships and the Labatt Blue Pond Hockey Tournament. The BC Pond Hockey Series started in 2009 in Rossland, BC and now includes tournaments in Prince George, BC and Invermere, BC. The U.S. Pond Hockey Championship has been played on Lake Calhoun and Lake Nokomis, both of which are located in Minneapolis, Minnesota. There are 116 teams that compete in the tournament, and each team has four players. Twenty-four sheets of ice are utilized for the event, with each sheet surrounded by short boards (unlike the tall ones used in pro hockey). The World Pond Hockey Championship is played in Tobique Valley, New Brunswick, and utilizes 22 sheets of ice for the games. Both tournaments have set their own rules in dealing with officials, penalties, equipment, and scoring. There is no skill level bias in these tournaments, so anyone is eligible to play. Due to popular demand, however, signing up early is essential. In the past couple of years, the popularity of these tournaments has exceeded expectations. The tournaments have been covered by multiple news stations and have also been the subject of multiple newspaper headlines. Spectators from all over stand in freezing conditions to watch these games. While the tournaments may have rules, their primary purpose is still for the enjoyment of all involved. The Labatt tournament, based in Buffalo, New York (home of the American headquarters of Labatt Brewing Company), is a more recent development. It was founded in January 2008 in the wake of the 2008 NHL Winter Classic and has been held annually each year since. Tournaments like the World Pond Hockey Championships and the U.S. Pond Hockey Championships have brought back the popularity of pond hockey, and have enlarged the pond hockey audience; the Buffalo tournament, for instance, has grown from an original 32-team bracket to 124 teams in 2011.

In 2009, the Pond Hockey Classic was founded in New England, The Pond Hockey Classic currently hosts three pond hockey events, the New England Pond Hockey Classic in Meredith, NH on Lake Winnipesaukee with over 250 teams, the Lake Champlain Pond Hockey Classic in Colchester, VT on Lake Champlain with over 100 teams and the Montana Pond Hockey Classic in Kalispell, MT with over 60 teams. In 2014, the PHC acquired the Big Apple Pond Hockey Classic played in NYC at Bryant Park.

=== List of tournaments ===
- World Pond Hockey Championships
- Canadian National Pond Hockey Championships
- U.S. Pond Hockey Championships
- International Pond Hockey Championship (Saint-Jean-sur-Richelieu, Quebec)

Canada regional/local

- BC Pond Hockey Series
- Miramichi Rotary Pond Hockey Tournament

USA regional/local

- The Budd Lake Winter Classic, Budd Lake, NJ
- Wisconsin Pond Hockey Classic, Wausau WI
- Labatt Blue Pond Hockey Tournament
- Labatt Blue Rochester Pond Hockey Regional
- Vermont Pond Hockey Championships
- Pond Hockey Classic
  - New England Pond Hockey Classic
  - Lake Champlain Pond Hockey Classic
  - Montana Pond Hockey Classic
  - Big Apple Pond Hockey Classic

Nordic countries/local

- Save Pond Hockey Tournament

== Practice worldwide ==
- Even though pond hockey is not a popular sports in South-east Asia, there is a skating school of pond hockey in Megabox, Hong Kong.

== In popular culture ==
=== Films ===
Pond hockey has been seen played in multiple movies including Mystery, Alaska, The Mighty Ducks and the 2008 documentary film Pond Hockey. In Mystery, Alaska the whole movie is centred on pond hockey. In The Mighty Ducks it is just featured in certain scenes and flashbacks. In Pond Hockey it is the subject of the entire film, which celebrates the importance of the outdoor game.

== See also ==
- Bandy
