= Hockeyland =

2022 American documentary film

- Directed by: Tommy Haines
- Produced by: Tommy Haines; JT Haines; Andrew Sherburne
- Starring: Blake Biondi; Elliot Van Orsdel; Indio Dowd; Will Troutwine
- Cinematography: Benjamin Handler
- Music by: Will Blair; Brooke Blair
- Production company: Northland Films
- Distributed by: Greenwich Entertainment
- Release date: September 9, 2022 (United States)
- Running time: 108 minutes
- Country: United States
- Language: English

Hockeyland a 2022 American documentary film directed by Tommy Haines and produced by Northland Films, immerses audiences deep in the heart of Minnesota's North Country, where hockey is just as central to life as football was to the fictional town of Dillon, Texas, and the frozen surface that separates every teenage boy from the man they hope to become one day criss-crossed with red and blue lines. The film opened theatrically as the #1 documentary in the country for the week of September 9 and was a 2022 Critics Choice nominee for "Best Sports Documentary".

== Synopsis ==
Minnesota is the heartland of hockey creating more skaters on the local rinks and in the National Hockey League, than any other state. The documentary follows the senior boys hockey teams of rival towns. One an emerging dynasty, the other with a fabled past. Both teams face down uncertain futures, as they skate for a last chance to etch their names into local lore.

== Reception ==
David Ehrlich, IndieWire's Chief Film Critic, calls the film "raw and brutally absorbing...and as fresh as a newly Zamboni-ed sheet of ice." ESPN's Greg Wyshinski describes the film as "a fascinating look at Minnesota High School Hockey." Alex Mitchell of the New York Post expounds the film "captures a way of life like no other" Bruce Miller, film critic for the Sioux City Journal, praises the film as "one of those documentaries that sets the bar for others." MSP Magazine writer Steve Marsh says "Hockeyland transcends its genre: this is more than a hockey movie, this is drama."

== Box office ==
Dirstributed by Greenwich Entertainment, the film opened as the #1 documentary for the week of September 9th, 2022.

== Accolades ==
Award	Date of ceremony	Category	Recipient(s)	Result	Ref.
Critics' Choice Documentary Awards	November 13, 2022	Best Sports Documentary	Hockeyland	Nominated	
St. Louis Film Critics Association	November 21, 2021	The Joe Williams Documentary Feature Award	Hockeyland	Nominated	

== Festivals ==
- World Premiere - DocNYC (November 2021)
- Big Sky Documentary Film Festival (February, 2022)
- Seattle International Film Festival (April, 2022)
- St. Louis International Film Festival
- Milwaukee International Film Festival (May, 2022)
- RiverRun International Film Festival (May, 2022)

== See also ==
- List of films about ice hockey
