= Northland Films =

American independent film production company

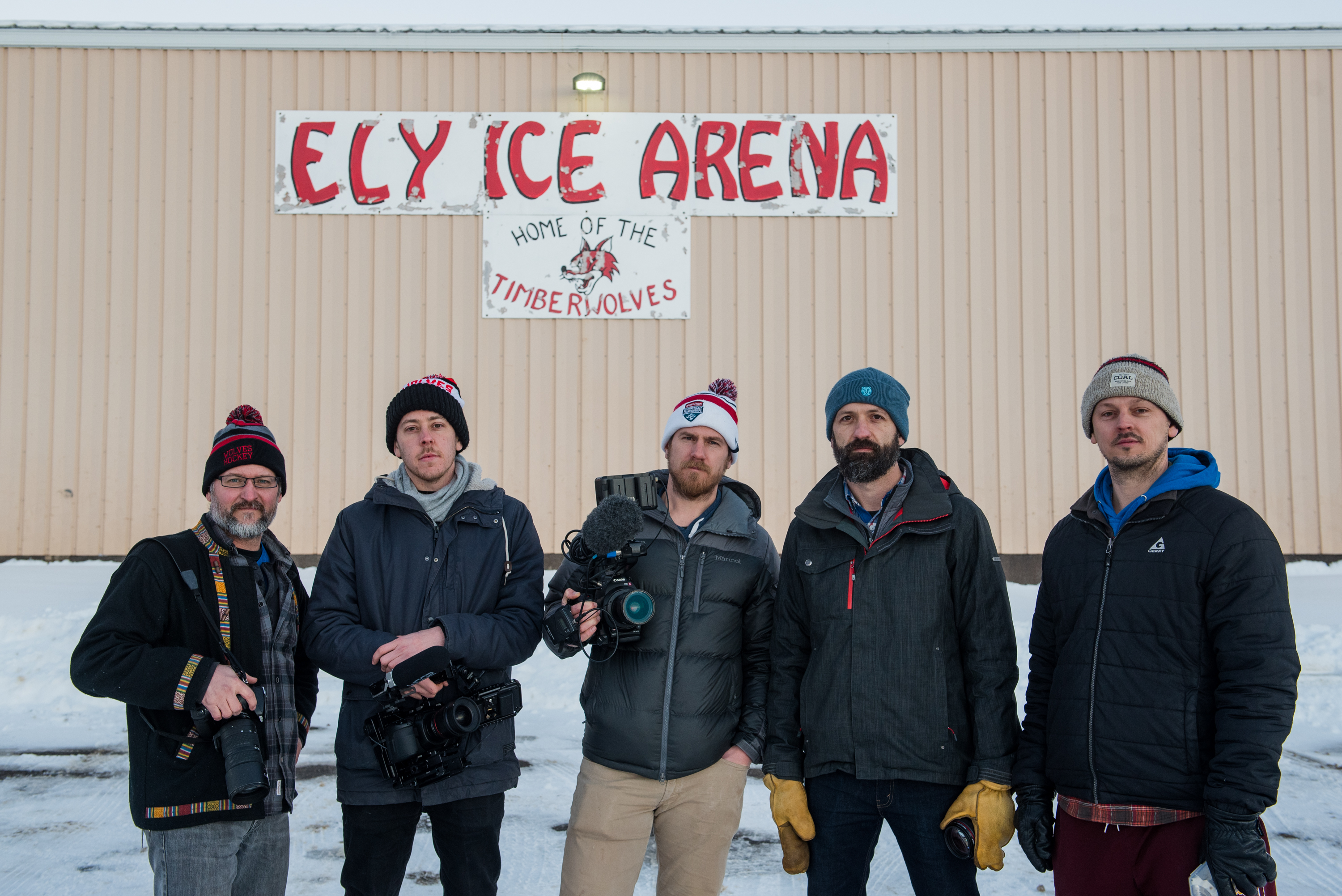

Northland Films Inc. is an independent documentary film production company. The Midwest-based crew has produced award-winning documentary films that have been featured in The New York Times, The Guardian, Los Angeles Times, Variety, The Hollywood Reporter and on ESPN and NBC Sports.

== History ==
Northland Films was formed in 2005 by Tommy Haines, JT Haines and Andrew Sherburne. Hockeyland, the company's most recent film, is a coming of age story set in the competitive hockey sphere of Minnesota's north country. Hailed as a "must-see...raw and brutally absorbing" by David Erhlich, Indiewire, Hockeyland premiered at DocNYC, screened in over 175 theaters nationwide by Greenwich Entertainment and was a 2022 Critics Choice "Best Sports Documentary" nominee.Saving Brinton, premiered at AFI Docs in 2017, aired nationwide on PBS through America ReFramed and was named one of “the Best Movies of 2018” by Ann Hornaday, The Washington Post. Gold Fever (2013), an examination of invasive mining in indigenous Guatemala community was awarded the 2014 International Federation for Human Rights Film Award. Their debut documentary, Pond Hockey, (2008) featuring Wayne Gretzky, Sidney Crosby, Neal Broten and Patrick Kane, is a celebration of outdoor hockey and was an early look into the over-structured world of youth sports. The film was dubbed “the best hockey movie ever” by John Buccigross, ESPN and aired nationwide on the NHL Network. Their films have played at over 80 festivals in 43 countries, including Rotterdam International Film Festival, Thessaloniki International Film Festival, Edinburgh International Film Festival, Jeonju, and BAFICI. They are now at work on The Workshop, a patient portrait of the prestigious and closely guarded Iowa Writers’ Workshop.

== Films ==
- Hockeyland (2022) is a feature-length documentary about senior boys of rival towns as they face down uncertain futures as they skate for a last chance to etch their names into local lore and is a Critics' Choice Documentary Awards "Best Sports Documentary" nominee.
- Pond Hockey (2008) includes appearances by Wayne Gretzky, Sidney Crosby, Neal Broten, John Buccigross and Patrick Kane and is considered one of Bleacher Report's "8 Must see hockey movies".
- Forgotten Miracle (2009) is a feature-length documentary celebrating the 50th anniversary of the USA's gold medal in ice hockey at the 1960 Winter Olympics.
- Gold Fever (2013) is a documentary about the destructive and exploitative impacts of transnational mining.
- Husker Sand (2015) is a short documentary following LeRoy Sands as he competes for the National Corn Husking Championships.
- Saving Brinton (2018) is a feature-length documentary about Michael Zahs's efforts to save the film collection of Frank Brinton.
