= World Pond Hockey Championships =

Annual competition in Plaster Rock, New Brunswick, Canada

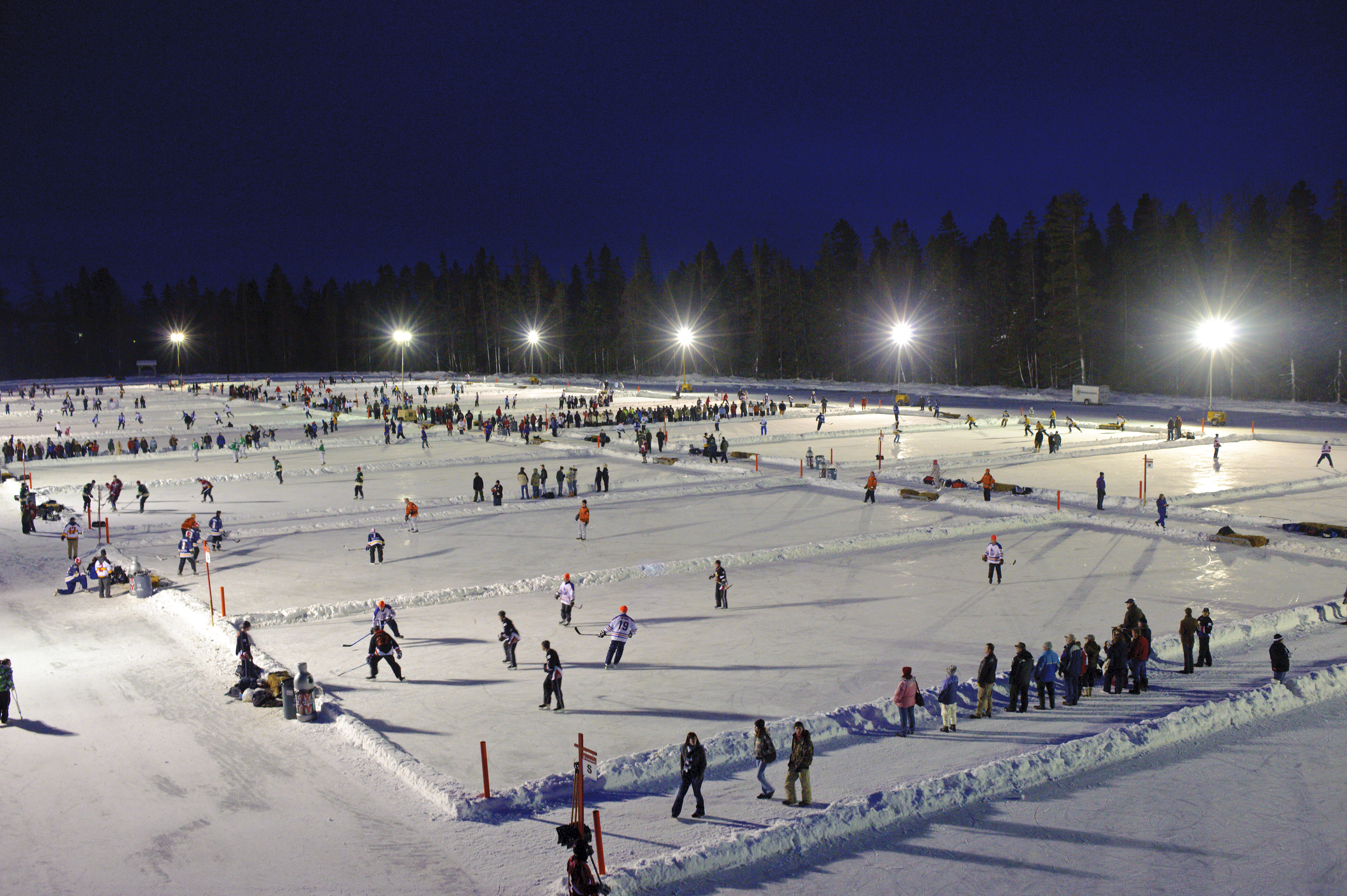
2010 edition of the Championship.

The World Pond Hockey Championships is an annual international competition that takes place on a lake, playing the pond hockey variant of ice hockey. The event takes place in Plaster Rock, New Brunswick, in the village of Tobique Valley, on Roulston Lake.

== History ==
The first World Pond Hockey Championship tournament was held in 2002. The event was created by Tom Chamberlain and Danny Braun, the director for community development of Plaster Rock and the current President and CEO of the tournament. Danny first set out wanting to organize an event to help raise money for a new recreation centre for the Tobique Valley community. So in 2000, Braun organized a fundraiser in the form of a snowmobile race. The event was popular and well received by the community, but it failed to generate a large enough profit to justify running for more than two years. It was at this point in 2002 that Braun got the idea to organize a pond hockey tournament instead. In its first year ever run, the World Pond Hockey Championship tournament featured 40 teams from the Canadian provinces of New Brunswick, Nova Scotia, and Prince Edward Island, and from the state of Maine, U.S. Unlike the snowmobile race, it was financially successful, and continued to grow with more teams registering every year. Its continued growth and popularity allowed for the construction of the Tobique-Plex recreation centre that officially opened in November, 2007. Over the past seven years that the tournament has been held, the profits from the event continue to help pay for the operating costs of the centre.

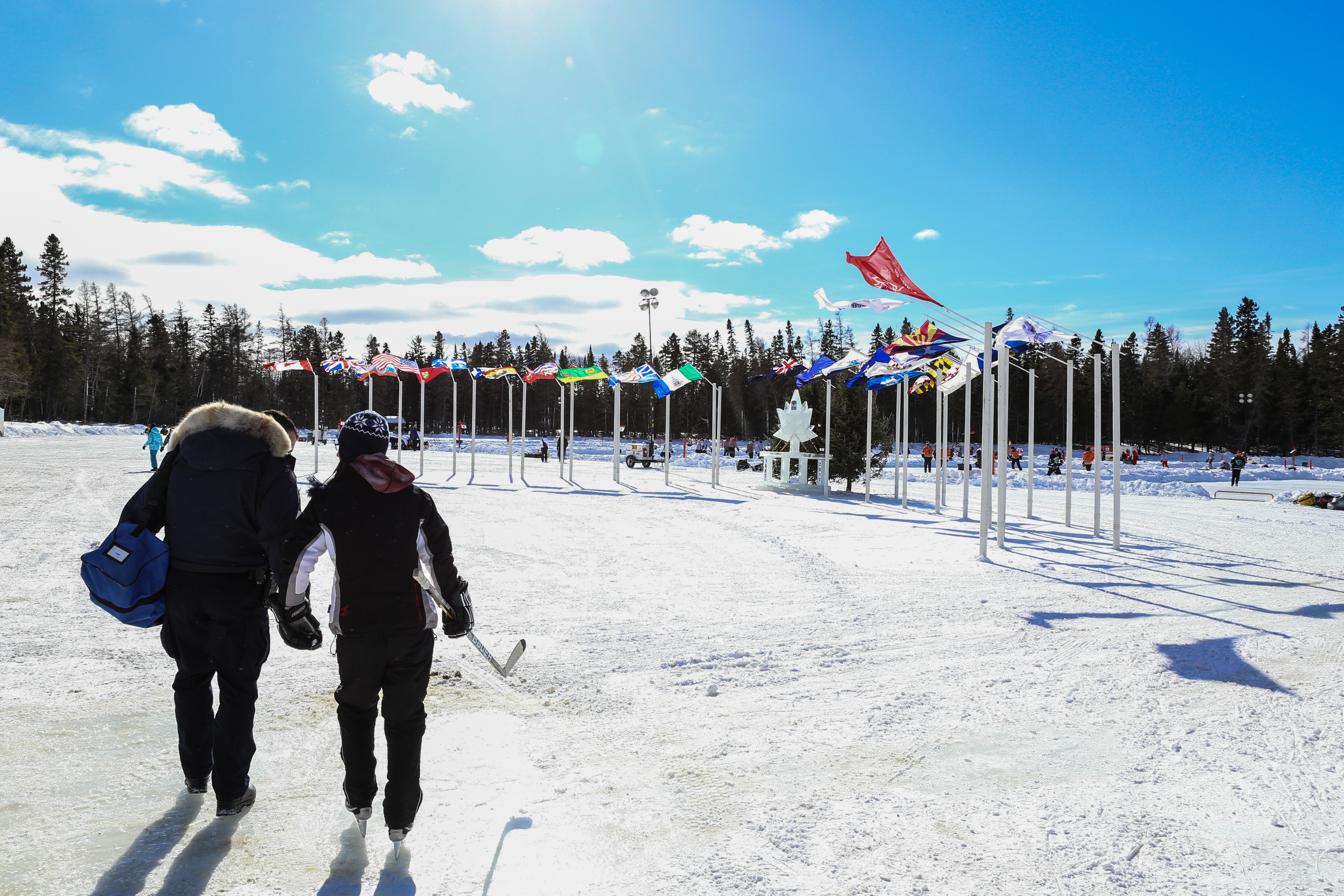
The championship in New Brunswick in 2017.

Since its debut, the tournament has greatly expanded from its original 40 teams. It now features 120 teams from 15 countries all over the world such as the United Kingdom, Singapore, the Cayman Islands, Puerto Rico, and Denmark. There are now participating teams from all of the Canadian provinces, and from 35 states from the U.S. Every year, over 200 volunteers help to maintain the ice and run the event, while over 8,000 people, including many representatives from newspapers, television networks, and other media companies, watch and participate in the tournament. In 2007, the organizers of the event received over 800 applications from teams wanting to enroll in the competition, which is significantly higher than the 100 applications they received in the first year the tournament was held. It was in this same year that the Prime Minister of Canada, Stephen Harper, attended the World Pond Hockey Championships, dropping the puck to signify the official start of that year's tournament.

== Description ==
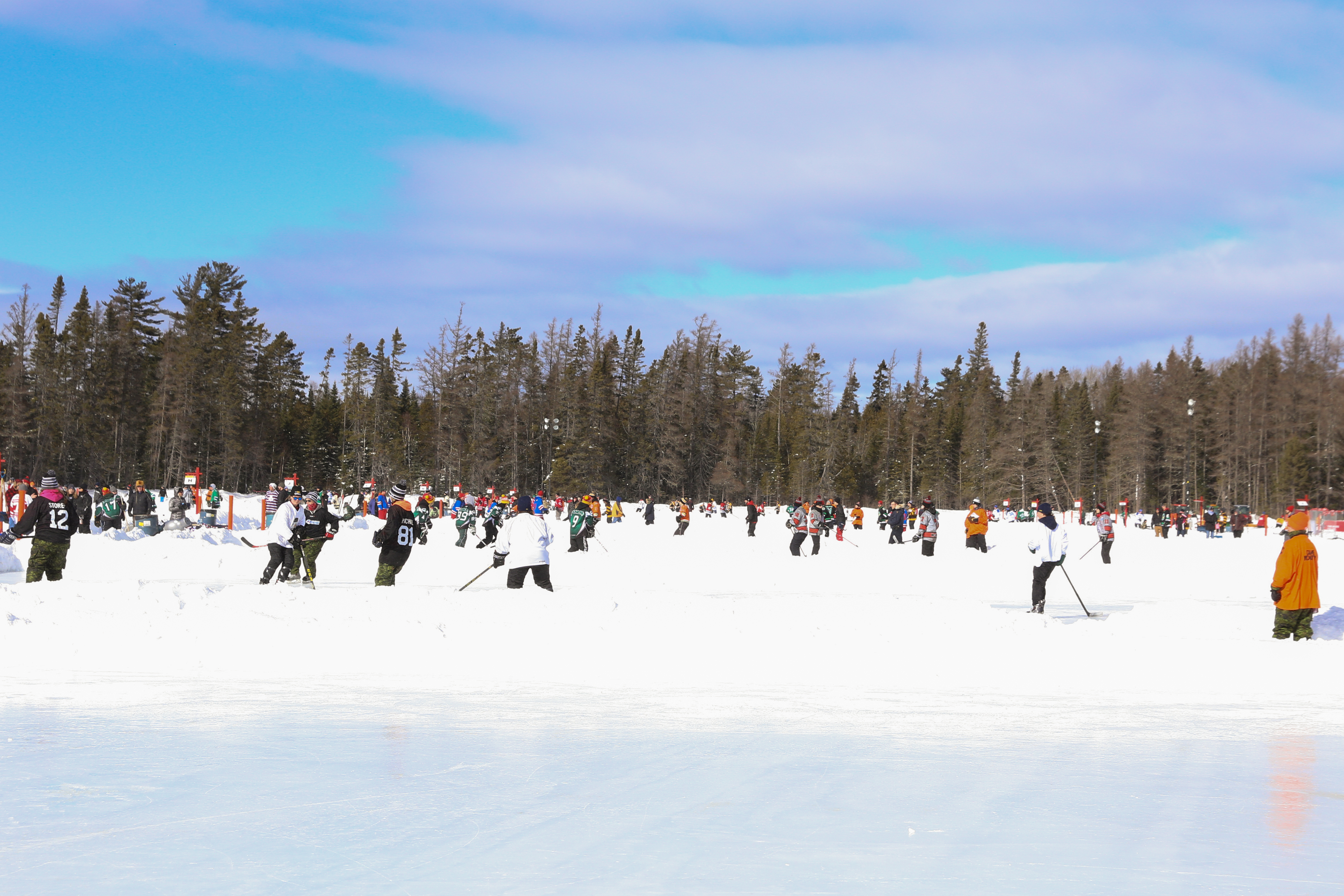
The championship's outdoor rinks in New Brunswick.

The World Pond Hockey Championship tournament is played in a four-on-four, round robin format. The 20 outdoor rinks allow for 40 teams to play at any given time. All competing teams consist of 4 players ages 19 and over, but they are permitted to have a fifth member in case of injury or illness. Every team is guaranteed at least five 30-minute games over the course of the four-day tournament. The playoff round starts on the Sunday of every tournament weekend, which features the best 32 teams from the previous rounds.

The Pond Hockey Championships feature some untraditional rules and notable differences in gameplay as compared to traditional hockey games. The nets that players must score on are 6 feet wide, but only 10 inches high, so all shots must be kept low to the ice. This is to ensure that pucks cannot be shot into one of the other closely situated rinks and disrupt games or spectators. There are no goalies, and players have to be over the centre line of the rink in order to score. There is also no traditional penalty box in this tournament; if any penalties are called on a member of one team, the opposing team automatically is awarded one goal.

Country	Championships
CAN	12
USA	6
CZE	2

== Tournaments ==
Year	Champion Team	Origin		Team
2002	Tobique Puckers	Plaster Rock, New Brunswick, Canada	CAN	Scott McNabb, Shaun Davis, Ryan Porter, David Myles
2003	Progressive Planning	Fredericton, New Brunswick, Canada	CAN	Brad Tremblay, David Deap, Troy Small, Sean Smith
2004	Boston Danglers	Boston, Massachusetts, United States of America	USA	Mark Goble, Cooper Naylor, Mark Cornforth, Rob Atkinson
2005	Boston Danglers	Boston, Massachusetts, United States of America	USA	Mark Goble, Cooper Naylor, Mark Cornforth, Rob Atkinson
2006	Boston Danglers	Boston, Massachusetts, United States of America	USA	Mark Goble, Cooper Naylor, Mark Cornforth, Rob Atkinson
2007	Boston Danglers	Boston, Massachusetts, United States of America	USA	Mark Goble, Rob Beck, Mark Cornforth, Rob Atkinson
2008	Wheat Kings	Saint John, New Brunswick, Canada	CAN	David Myles, Charlie Cameron, Bob Brown, Jeff Peddigrew
2009	Wheat Kings	Saint John, New Brunswick, Canada	CAN	David Myles, Charlie Cameron, Bob Brown, Jeff Peddigrew
2010-Open Division	New York Boars	New York, New York, United States of America	USA	Steve Malley, Brad Parsons, Mike Sayre, Chris Corrinet, Chris Dirkes
2010-Ladies' Division	STU Has-Been Tommies	Fredericton, New Brunswick, Canada	CAN	Zachary Boudreau, Rebekah Thompson, Amy MacLennan, Sarah Braam, Kristina O'Brien
2011-Open Division	New York Boars	New York, New York, United States of America	USA	Steve Malley, Brad Parsons, Tyler Moyer, Steve Shirreffs, Chris Dirkes
2011-Ladies' Division	Hilltop Bud Lights	Fredericton, New Brunswick, Canada	CAN	
2012-Open Division	Hilltop Budweisers 2012	Fredericton, New Brunswick, Canada	CAN	Brad Henderson, Fred Walsh, Adam Nelson, Jason Nelson, Shawn Mersereau
2013-Open Division	The Acadian Boys	Tracadie-Sheila, New Brunswick, Canada	CAN	Ulysse Brideau, Martin Mcgraw, Glen Ferguson, Martin Richard, Jeff Wilson
2014-Open Division	The Acadian Boys	Tracadie-Sheila, New Brunswick, Canada	CAN	Ulysse Brideau, Martin Mcgraw, Glen Ferguson, Martin Richard, Jeff Wilson
2015-Open Division	The Acadian Boys	Tracadie-Sheila, New Brunswick, Canada	CAN	Ulysse Brideau, Martin Mcgraw, Glen Ferguson, Martin Richard, Jeff Wilson
2016-Open Division	The Acadian Boys	Tracadie-Sheila, New Brunswick, Canada	CAN	Ulysse Brideau, Martin Mcgraw, Glen Ferguson, Martin Richard, Jeff Wilson
2017-Open Division	The Acadian Boys	Tracadie-Sheila, New Brunswick, Canada	CAN	Ulysse Brideau, Martin Mcgraw, Glen Ferguson, Martin Richard, Jeff Wilson
2018-Open Division	Starý Pušky (Old Guns)	Žďár nad Sázavou, Czech Republic	CZE	Aleš Stoček, Miroslav Bukáček, Petr Janda, Jiří Plachý, Pavel Pelán, Ondřej Mařata (coach)
2019-Open Division	Captains Náměšť nad Oslavou	Náměšť nad Oslavou, Czech Republic	CZE	Jiří Krčál, Martin Pejchal, Mirek Bednář, Ondra Kohút, Petr Lainka

== See also ==
- U.S. Pond Hockey Championships
- Canadian National Pond Hockey Championships
