= Jack Falla =

Guernsey-born British racing drivere

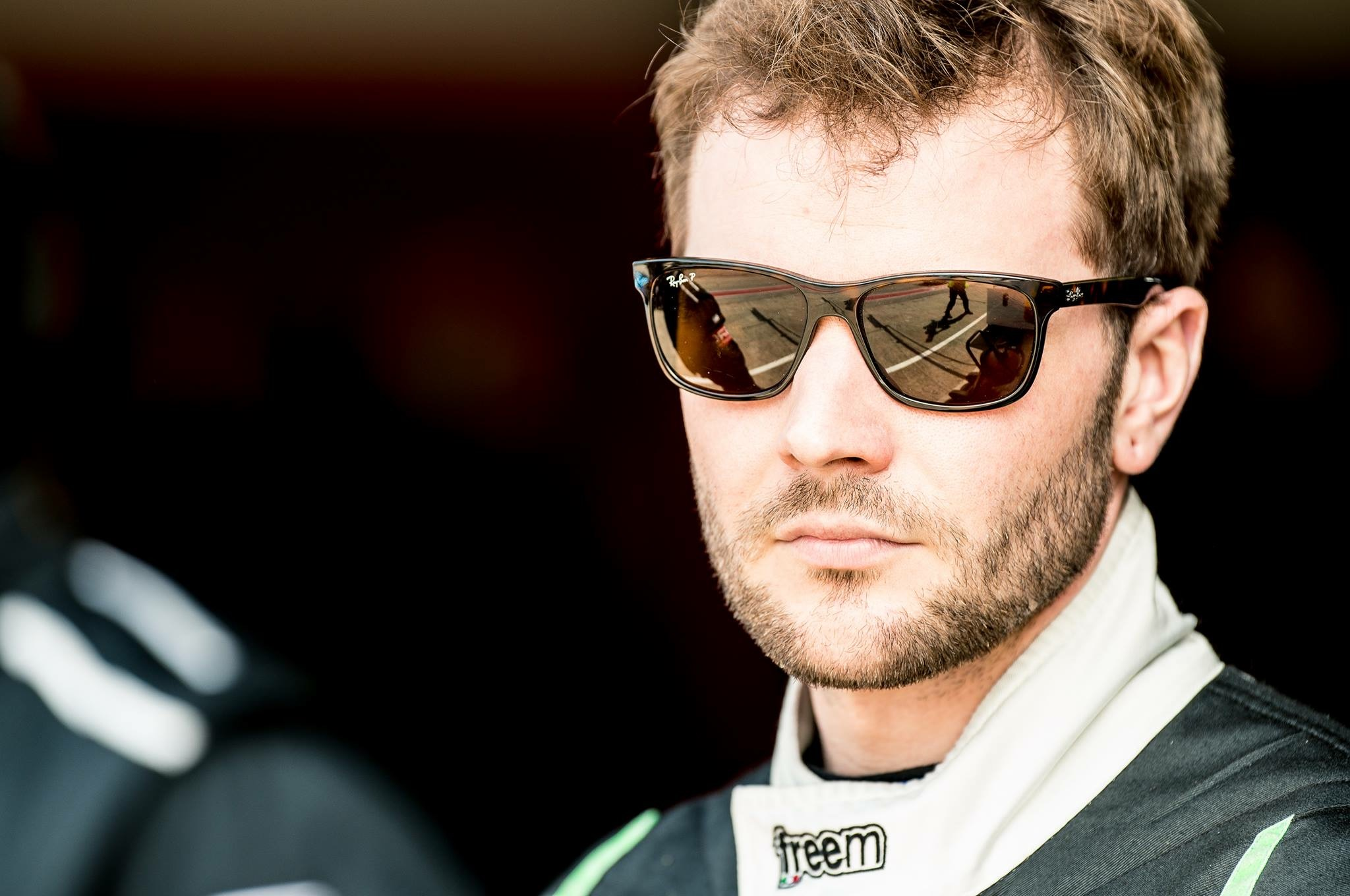

Jack Falla is a Guernsey born British racing driver who has had multiple podiums in Carrera Cup Australia, Carrera Cup Great Britain, he also competed in Blancpain Sprint Series as a Lamborghini Junior Driver. He is a former winner of Wanneroo 300 at Perth, Australia in the GT3 class. He also finished third in Carrera Cup GB.

== Personal life and education ==
Jack Falla was born on June 12, 1987, in Guernsey Channel Islands. He completed his education at the University of Surrey.
