= U.S. Pond Hockey Championships =

American pond hockey event

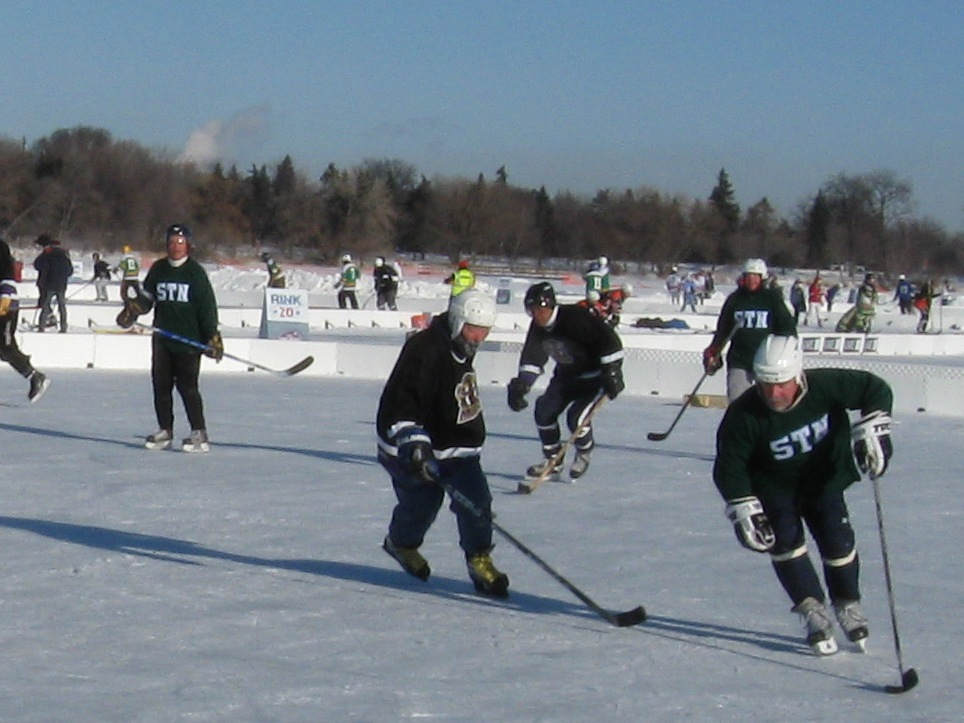
A game of two teams in the 50+ division

The U.S. Pond Hockey Championships are an annual pond hockey event on Lake Nokomis in Minneapolis, Minnesota. Though an amateur tournament, the competition draws hockey enthusiasts from all over North America, many of whom have pro and college hockey experience.

ESPN.com listed the tournament as part of their "101 Things Sports Fans Must Experience Before They Die."

The Tournament's slogan is, "HOCKEY. THE WAY NATURE INTENDED."

== Format ==
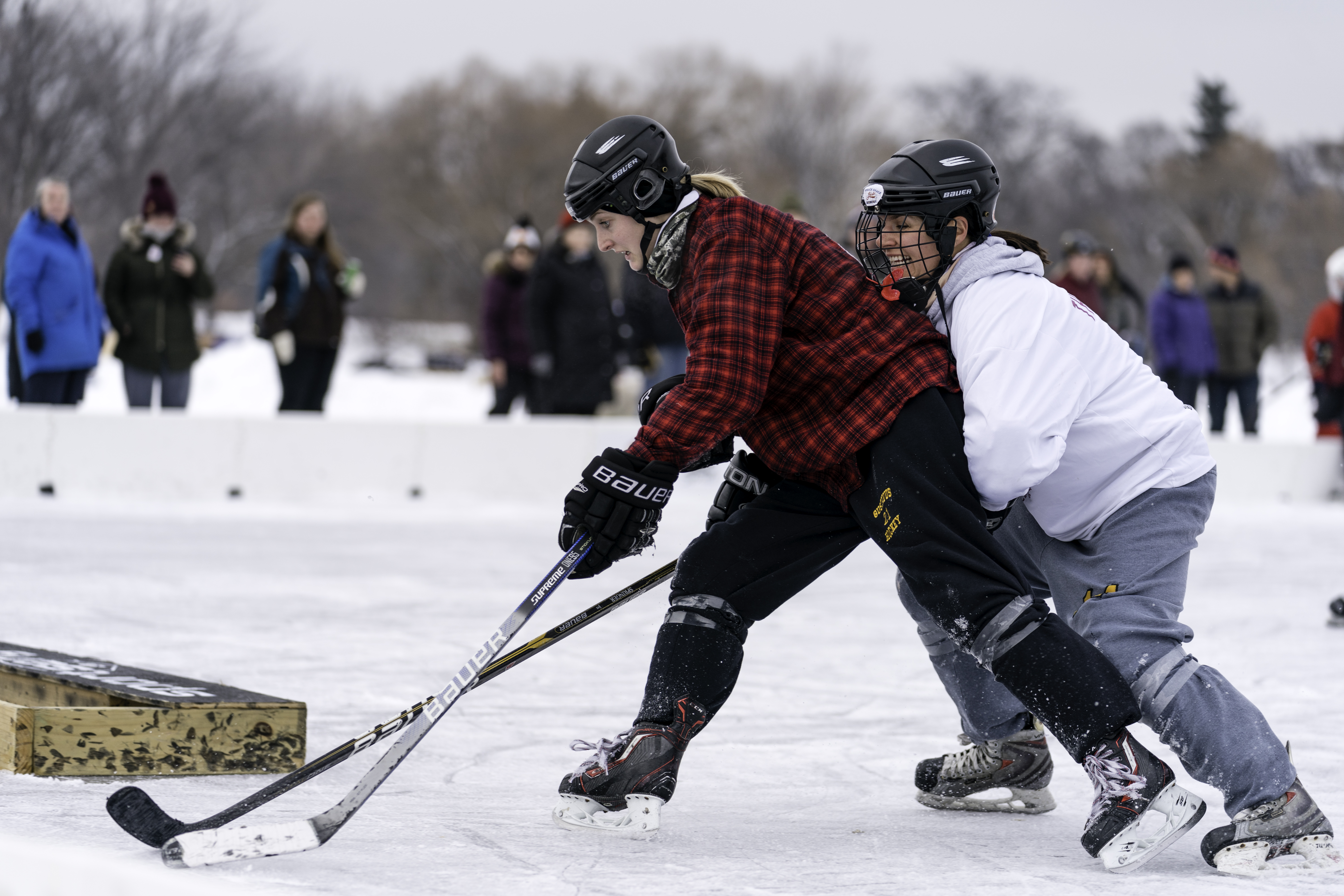
Players in the 2020 women's final

The tournament includes competition in six divisions:

- The Open Division (anyone can play)
- 40 and over Division
- 50 and over Division
- Rink Rats (for teams who don't want to face the competitiveness in the Open Division)
- Women's
- Seniors
- Bender

The Bender Division is for amateurs who learned hockey while adults.

The teams compete for a trophy called the Golden Shovel. Each year, the winners of each division get to engrave their names into the Golden Shovel in a tradition reminiscent of the NHL's Stanley Cup.

== Past winners (Open Division) ==
Year	Team	Origin	Roster
2006	Wright Homes/Almost 40		Curt Wright, Justin Brown, Dan Goff, Dave Bakken, Dave Shute, Randy Gallatin
2007	Whiskey Bandits		Jamison Steinert, Matt Elsen, Jess Johnson, Tim Olson, Nick Hanrahan, Dan Ibrahim
2008	Wright Homes/Almost 40		Curt Wright, Justin Brown, Dan Goff, Dave Bakken, Dave Shute, Randy Gallatin
2009	Concord USA		Sam Cornelius, Peter Fitzgerald, Billy Hengen, Justin Kapsen, Geoff Kragness, Jeff Yurecko
2010	Wright Homes/Almost 40		Curt Wright, Justin Brown, Dan Goff, Dave Bakken, Dan Donnette, Randy Gallatin
2011	Whiskey Bandits		Matt Elsen, Tim Olsen, Nicholas Hanrahan, Joey Dustin, Jesse Johnson, Jamison Steinert
2012	Wright Homes/Almost 40		Curt Wright, Dave Bakken, Dan Donnette, Randy Gallatin, Geno Parrish, Matt Erredge
2013	WoodStars		Nick Reichert, Doug Nelson, Erik Heltne, Ross Cooney, Kevin Rollwagen, Mike Taylor

2014	Wright Homes/Almost 40
2015	Surging Cycle/Red Army
2016	Wright Homes/FHIT
2017	Wright Homes/Four Star Hockey
2018	Wright Homes/Four Star Hockey
2019	RJ Ryan Construction
2020	Hendy Homes/Tail Gators
2022	Glue Gun.com
2023	Faherty Brand
2024	Championship round cancelled due to weather conditions
2025	All Around

== Tournaments ==
=== 2007 Tournament ===
Due to the unusually warm weather in Minnesota during the winter of 2006–2007, tournament sponsors moved the tournament from Lake Calhoun to Lake Nokomis. Notable players in the 2007 tournament include:

- Phil Housley
- Brad Bombardir
- Guy Kawasaki

=== 2011 Tournament ===
Held January 21–23, 2011 on Lake Nokomis.

=== 2026 Tournament ===
Held January 22–25, 2026 on Lake Nokomis.

== See also ==
- Canadian National Pond Hockey Championships
- World Pond Hockey Championships
- Hockey Day Minnesota
