= IJscolf =

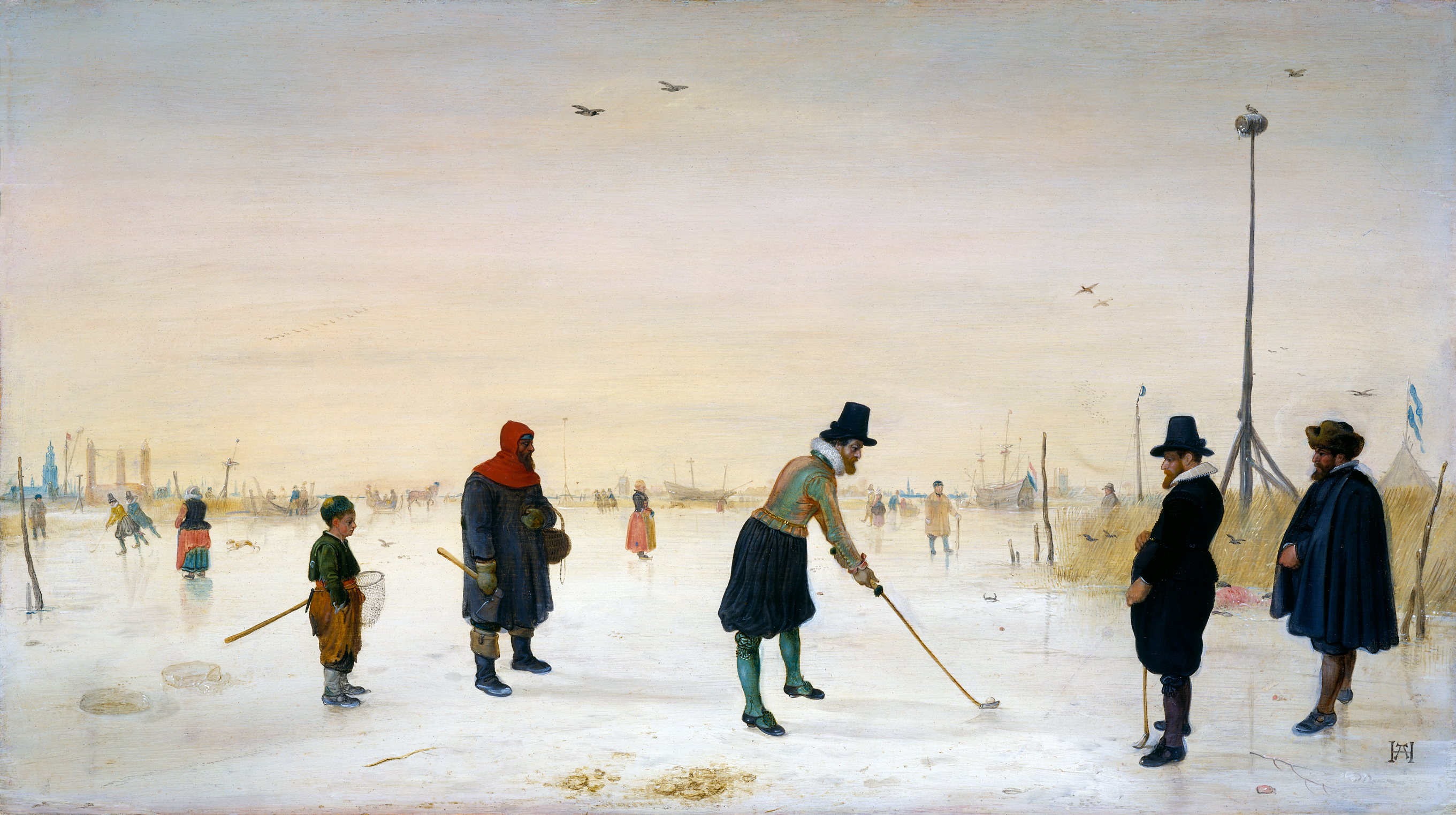
Kolfspelers op het ijs (Kolf players on the ice) by Hendrick Avercamp (ca. 1625)

IJscolf was a sport played on ice, popular in the Low Countries between the Middle Ages and the Dutch Golden Age. It was similar to ice hockey, although there is no evidence that ice hockey was directly influenced by the IJscolf.
