= Shinny =

Informal type of hockey played on ice

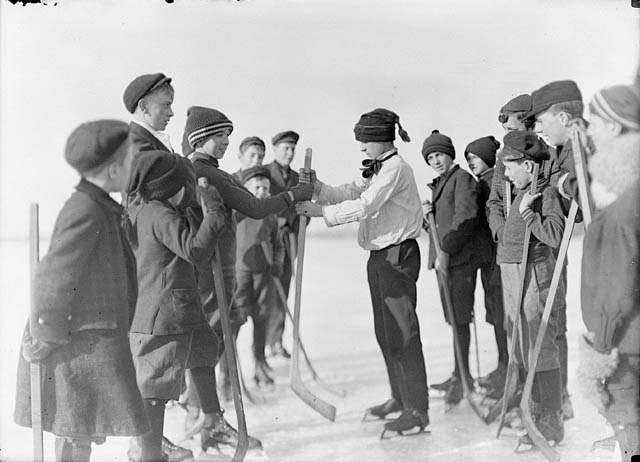
A group of boys picking teams for a game of shinny, Sarnia, Ontario, 1908

Shinny (also shinney, pick-up hockey, pond hockey, or "outdoor puck") is an informal type of ice hockey. It is also used as another term for street hockey, played on pavement.

There are no formal rules or specific positions, and often, there are no goaltenders. The goal areas at each end may be marked by nets, or simply by objects, such as stones or blocks of snow. Body checking and lifting or "roofing/reefing/raising the puck" (shooting the puck or ball so it rises above the ice) are often forbidden because the players are not wearing protective equipment. Shinny has also served a strong role in portrayals of Canadian youth. The game has also famously revolved around the culture of street sports.

In his book Country on Ice, Doug Beardsley claims that most Canadian ice hockey professional players have played some form of shinny in their youth.

== Team formation ==
There is a common ritual for choosing teams, which has each player "throwing" their hockey stick into a pile at centre ice, or the middle area between two nets. A player then divides the pile into two smaller piles, ostensibly at random, but perhaps strategically assigning sticks to one side or another. Players then pick up their own sticks, forming teams.

Teams are often formed with intent to divide the group into approximately equal levels of skills among the players. Players joining after play has started are usually told "which way they are going" (which net they should shoot towards) based upon the score of the game and their skill level. Some games continue for many hours with a variety of players participating for as long as they want.

== History and name origin ==
A game with similarities to shinny, but played on dirt, not ice, is widely reported in memoirs and ethnographic literature among Native American tribes throughout North America and may be its origin – for example, Thomas Jefferson Mayfield's memoir of his adopted boyhood among the Indians of Kings River, California (Indian Summer, Berkeley, Heyday, 1993). Sports historian Margaret Ann Hall describes this indigenous game as using curved sticks to hit a small ball, made of wood or stuffed deerskin, across a field of dirt or ice and between a pair of posts at either end of the field. According to Hall, the game was mainly a women's sport while lacrosse was mainly played by men. Shinny, generally believed to be a precursor to ice hockey, was informal enough in its formative years that the pucks and sticks were often makeshift. During the Great Depression, for example, northern boys used tree branches or broomhandles as sticks, a tin can, a piece of wood, and even a frozen road apple (horse dropping) as a puck. Any object about the right size might serve as a puck.

The name is derived from the Scottish game shinty and shinny was a common name for one of shinty's many regional variations in Scotland. Shinny, a primarily Canadian term, is usually called "pick-up hockey" or "pond hockey" in the United States.

A myth perpetuates in Canada that the name is derived from children tying Eaton's catalogues around their legs (especially goalies) as a makeshift type of shinguard.

== Institutionalized usage ==
In some municipalities around the world where the climate permits, part of a city's taxes may go to the formal set-up and maintenance of skating rinks designed specifically for shinny. In some cities, such as Montreal, Edmonton, and Calgary, numerous rinks are erected and are maintained by civil servants throughout the winter as long as the weather allows their usage to continue.

The city of Toronto hosts free or low-cost shinny sessions and also has programs for adults to learn how to play hockey on city rinks. Toronto has more outdoor mechanically cooled rinks than any city in the world, with 54 outdoor mechanically cooled rinks currently in operation.

The programs, expanded in 2011, include parent/child shinny and two levels of beginner, and are supervised by city-paid coaches.

== See also ==
- Street sports
