= Canadian National Pond Hockey Championships =

Annual pond hockey tournament

The Canadian National Pond Hockey Championships are held annually at the Deerhurst Resort in Huntsville, Muskoka District Municipality, Ontario, Canada.

The pond hockey variant used at the nationals plays 4 on 4 without a goalie, with two 15-minute halves and 5-minute halftime break. The winners of the three championship divisions are awarded the coveted Maple Cup.

== Men's Ontario Championship ==
The Ontario qualifier for the Canadian Nationals lasted only one year. The host site was Valen's Conservation Area in Flamborough, Ontario. The tournament is otherwise an annual event. The Barrie Bruins defeated the Milton Moose Knuckles 14-8 to take the Ontario title.

Year	Champion Team	Origin		Team
2009	Barrie Theta TTS Bruins	Barrie	Ontario	Doug Battaglia, Kevin Culhane, Lincoln Dolbear, Paul Myerscough, Ken Pagan

== Men's Open Championship Division 25+ ==
Year	Champion Team	Origin		Team
2006	Rink Rake Whitby Greybeards	Whitby	Ontario
2007	Barrie Theta TTS Bruins	Barrie	Ontario	Kevin Culhane, Lincoln Dolbear, Paul Myerscough, Jeff Oestreicher, Ken Pagan, GM Gerry Culhane
2008	Barrie Theta TTS Bruins	Barrie	Ontario	Kevin Culhane, Lincoln Dolbear, Paul Myerscough, Jeff Oestreicher, Ken Pagan, GM Gerry Culhane
2009	Officetrax Vandals	Brampton	Ontario	Brandon Dawe (C), Danny Gould, Mike Cross, Matty Moore, Stace Page, Kenny Sousa
2010	Officetrax Vandals	Brampton	Ontario	Brandon Dawe (C), Danny Gould, Mike Cross, Matty Moore, Stace Page, Kenny Sousa
2011	Officetrax Vandals	Brampton	Ontario	Brandon Dawe (C), Danny Gould, Mike Cross, Matty Moore, Stace Page, Kenny Sousa

== Women's Open Championship Division 19+ ==
Year	Champion Team	Origin		Team
2006	Rink Rake Concordia Rinkles	Montreal	Quebec
2007	Rink Rake Concordia Rinkles	Montreal / Vaudreuil-Dorion	Quebec
2008	Ice Angels	Hamilton	Ontario	Sherri Beckerson (C), Ashley Moore, Michelle Gallant, Lindsay Maksymchuk, Meghan Weedon
2009	The Wade Belaks	Toronto	Ontario	2010	Rink Rake Concordia Rinkles	Montreal / Vaudreuil-Dorion	Quebec	2011	The Wade Belaks	Toronto, Ontario	Ontario

== Men's Masters Championship 35+ ==
Masters Division is for players 35 years of age and older

Year	Champion Team	Origin		Team
2006
2007	Cornwall Six-Shooters	Cornwall	Ontario
2008	Team Hillsburgh	Toronto	Ontario
2009	Cornwall Six-Shooters	Cornwall	Ontario
2010	Montana's Barrie	Barrie	Ontario	Kevin Culhane, Travis Duhaime, Bruce Marietti, Paul Matheson, Jeff Oestreicher, Ken Pagan
2011	Montana's Barrie	Barrie	Ontario	Kevin Culhane, Travis Duhaime, Bruce Marietti, Paul Matheson, Jeff Oestreicher, Ken Pagan
2015	Barrie Bruins	Barrie	Ontario	Kevin Culhane, Lincoln Dolbear, Sean Madigan, Paul Matheson, Ken Pagan, Tighe Ransom

== Championships ==
=== 2006 Championships ===
The first championships took place over one weekend.

In the Men's Open Division, the Rink Rake Greybeards defeated the Barrie Theta TTS Bruins to win the inaugural championship.

=== 2007 Championships ===
The second championships used 24 rinks on 6 acres (24,000 m^{2}) of lake ice, and took place over two weekends. The championships were aired nationally on TSN in a one-hour special.

In the Men's Open Division, in a rematch of last year's final, the Barrie Theta TTS Bruins defeated the Rink Rake Greybeards 14-11.

In the Women's Open Division, the Rink Rake Concordia Rinkles win the championship for the second straight year, defeating the Wade Belaks of Toronto 18-11.

=== 2008 Championships ===
In the Men's Open Division, the Barrie Theta TTS Bruins defeated the Pond Hawks of North Bay, to be the first multiple year winner on the men's side, winning for the second year in a row.

In the Women's Open Division, the Ice Angels of Hamilton defeat the Wade Belaks from Toronto. The returning champions, Rink Rake Wrinkles from Vaudreuil-Dorion were defeated in the elimination round.

== See also ==
- U.S. Pond Hockey Championships
- World Pond Hockey Championships
